= List of Archibald Prize 1993 finalists =

This is a list of finalists for the 1993 Archibald Prize for portraiture (listed is Artist – Title).

== Prize winners ==
The 1993 Archibald Prize winners were:

- Garry Shead – Tom Thompson (Winner of the Archibald Prize)
- Angelika Erbsland – Colin Hayes OBE and friend (Winner of the Packing Room Prize) (Note that the 1993 winner of the Packing Room Prize was not a finalist.)
- Jennifer Little – Victor Sellu (Winner of The People's Choice Award)

== Finalists ==
The finalists were:

- Davida Allen – Dressing for Dinner – (Governor-general Bill Hayden)
- Kevin Connor – Self Portrait
- Fred Cress – Philip Cox
- Ken Done – Glen Murcutt 92
- Brian Dunlop – David Dridan
- Geoffrey Dyer – Dr Bob Brown (Environmentalist)
- Francis Giacco – Portrait of Lee-Lin Chin
- George Gittoes – Portrait of Ronaldo Cameron
- Robert Hannaford – Peter van Rood
- Robert Hannaford – Max Harris
- Bill Leak – The Late Prof. Brin Newton-John
- Kerrie Lester – Fred Hollows
- Jennifer Little – Victor Sellu (Winner of The People's Choice Award)
- Keith Looby – A.D. Hope
- Vladas Meskenas – Professor Fred Hollows
- Lewis Miller – Gareth Sansom Painting
- Josonia Palaitis – James Morrison
- Gretel Pinniger – Andrew Stevenson, Lawyer
- William Robinson – Professor John Robinson and Brother William
- Aileen Rogers – Tim Schultz
- Paul Ryan – Chris Haywood
- Jenny Sages – Keith Bain (Everyone is Doing the Farandole)
- Jenny Sands – Professor Alice Tay
- Garry Shead – Tom Thompson (Winner of the Archibald Prize) (Image)
- Jiawei Shen – PhD John Clark in black kimono (Image)
- Bryan Westwood – Margaret Olley

== See also ==
- Next year: List of Archibald Prize 1994 finalists
- List of Archibald Prize winners
- Lists of Archibald Prize finalists
