= List of Archibald Prize 1996 finalists =

This is a list of finalists for the 1996 Archibald Prize for portraiture (listed is Artist – Title).

- Davida Allen – Anne Purves in purple
- Rick Amor – Portrait of Paul Boston
- Judy Cassab – Robert Juniper
- Kordelya Zhansui Chi – 'Wrap time' portrait of John Ruane
- Kordelya Zhansui Chi – Hon Ms Jan Wade MP
- Peter Churcher – Betty at Home (Betty Churcher)
- Kevin Connor – Self-portrait in the Louvre food hall
- Graeme Davis – Chris Mann reading murder mysteries with pink curtain
- Geoffrey Dyer – Claudio Alcorso
- Joe Furlonger – Dr Harold Schenberg
- Francis Giacco – Family self-portrait
- Robert Hannaford – Self-portrait (Winner: People's Choice)
- Robert Hannaford – Cheryl Hurst
- Nicholas Harding – Portrait of Barry O'Keefe
- Paul Jackson – Self and Tui
- Kerrie Lester – James Morrison with flugelhorn
- Jocelyn Maughan – Paul Ashton Delprat, artist
- Lewis Miller – Portrait of Allan Mitelman
- Paul Newton – John Laws (Winner: Packing Room Prize)
- Josonia Palaitis – Ray Martin
- Jenny Sages – Paul Cox
- Wendy Sharpe – Self-portrait – as Diana of Erskineville (Winner: Archibald Prize 1996) (Image)
- Garry Shead – Jacqueline McKenzie
- Jiawei Shen – Self-portrait with GE (Chinese) Morrison (Image)
- Andrew Sibley – Mary-Lou Jelbart in the park
- Eric John Smith – Robert Walker
- Rosemary Valadon – Deborah Conway – in epic mode
- David Van Nunen – Portrait of the artist with Fauve
- Wes Walters – Gary Emery
- Guy Warren – Portrait of the artist as a young man
- Margaret Woodward – Self-portrait as Sarah Wisse, transported
- Salvatore Zofrea – Dr Franco Belgiorno-Nettis

== See also ==
- Previous year: List of Archibald Prize 1995 finalists
- Next year: List of Archibald Prize 1997 finalists
- List of Archibald Prize winners
