= List of Archibald Prize 2001 finalists =

This is a list of finalists for the 2001 Archibald Prize for portraiture (listed is Artist – Title).

== Finalists ==
- Bruce Armstrong – Peter Carey in Kelly country
- Michael Bell – Kingo and Boofhead, Lavendar Bay
- Danelle Bergstrom – The portrait and the painter (John Firth-Smith)
- David Bromley – Long Tom
- Tom Carment – John Gaden – summer portrait
- Brendon Ross Darby – Ian Parmenter
- Julie Dowling – Sister girl – Carol Dowling
- Geoffrey Dyer – The director John Clark
- Martine Emdur – Laughing on the inside – (Peter Berner)
- Paul Fairweather – Exhibitors of exuberance, Mostyn Bramley-Moore: a tribute to Michael Milburn
- Margarita Georgiadis – Excelle – Libbi Gorr
- Guo Hua Cai – Lee Lin Chin
- Robert Hannaford – Richard Maurovic
- Nicholas Harding – John Bell as King Lear (Winner: Archibald Prize 2001)
- Cherry Hood – Matthys
- Bill Leak – Robert Hughes – nothing if not critical
- Kerrie Lester – Contemplating the emperor's new clothes – (Akira Isogawa)
- Mathew Lynn – Hetti Perkins
- Lewis Miller – Self portrait
- Henry Mulholland – Michael Snape
- David Naseby – A blackguard rehearsing – Max Cullen
- Paul Newton – Roy and HG (John Doyle and Greig Pickhaver) (Winner: People's Choice 2001)
- Rodney Pople – Head study – Richard Goodwin
- Sally Robinson – Antony Walker
- Jenny Sages – Jackie and Kerryn
- Michael Snape – Paul Hopmeier and Ron Robertson-Swann
- Kim Spooner – and see the light surrounding you (Daniel Johns)
- Branca Uzur – Tetsuya Wakuda
- John R Walker – Portrait of Tony Bilson
- Greg Warburton – The Public Defender – portrait of John Nicholson S.C.
- Dick Watkins – Adam Cullen

== See also ==
- Previous year: List of Archibald Prize 2000 finalists
- Next year: List of Archibald Prize 2002 finalists
- List of Archibald Prize winners
