= List of Archibald Prize 1994 finalists =

This is a list of finalists for the 1994 Archibald Prize for portraiture (listed is Artist – Title).

- Roger Akinin – Portrait of Joseph Graffi
- Bruce Armstrong – Jan Senbergs
- Bob Baird – Salvatore Zofrea – Psalm 58
- Li (David) Baohua – Portrait (Hazel Hawke)
- Kevin Connor – Portrait of Hendrik Kolenberg
- Fred Cress – Other Selves
- John Edwards – Tess Knight (Artist, Friend, Academic)
- Francis Giacco – Homage to John Reichard (Winner: Archibald Prize 1994) (Image)
- George Gittoes – Self Portrait in Somalia
- James Gleeson – Portrait of the Artist as an Evolving Landscape
- Robert Hannaford – Self Portrait
- Robert Hannaford – The Lord Mayor
- Nicholas Harding – Portrait of Kenneth W Tribe
- Hongbin Zhao – Graeme McMahon
- Bill Leak – Malcolm Turnbull (People's Choice)
- Kerrie Lester – Richard Goodwin
- Lewis Miller – John Wolseley
- Ann Morton – Self Portrait
- Henry Mulholland – Susie Carleton
- Gretel Pinniger – The Enlightened Educator – Dr Bruce Carter, Headmaster of Cranbrook, with his son Nick and the artist's son Sigi
- Peter Robertson – Kate Ceberano (Packing Room Prize)
- William Robinson – Unanimous Self Portrait
- Jenny Sages – Loti and Victor Smorgon
- John Scurry – Portrait of Allan Mitelman, painter
- Wendy Sharpe – Self-portrait
- Garry Shead – Alice Kalmar-Spigelman
- Jiawei Shen – Hedda's camera (Portrait of Claire Roberts) (Image)
- Ian Smith – Ray Hughes
- Ann Thomson – David Malouf
- Rosemary Valadon – Noni Hazlehurst – Summer '94 Waiting Again
- David Van Nunen – Portrait of the Artist as a Young Man on a Horse
- Wes Walters – David Hobson as Orpheus

== See also ==
- Previous year: List of Archibald Prize 1993 finalists
- Next year: List of Archibald Prize 1995 finalists
- List of Archibald Prize winners
- Lists of Archibald Prize finalists
