= List of Archibald Prize 1997 finalists =

This is a list of finalists for the 1997 Archibald Prize for portraiture (listed is Artist – Title).

- Rick Amor – Peter Carey at the VACB Studio, Soho, New York
- Tom Carment – Roger McDonald at work
- Judy Cassab – Elwyn Lynn
- Peter Churcher – Portrait of John S. Levi, first Australian Born Rabbi
- Fred Cress – David Williamson
- Adam Cullen – Portrait of Mikey Robins (comedian)
- Elisabeth Cummings – Jean Appleton
- Merilyn Fairskye – Jackie 2
- Joe Furlonger – Self-portrait with model
- George Gittoes – John Olsen
- Robert Hannaford – Paul Davies (scientist)
- Nicholas Harding – Portrait of Kevin Connor
- Bill Leak – Tex (Perkins) (Winner: Packing Room Prize)
- Kerrie Lester – Janet Vernon in reflection
- Mathew Lynn – Jeanne Ryckmans (Winner: People's Choice) Highly Commended
- Jocelyn Maughan – Dr John Yu
- Lewis Miller – Portrait of Allan Mitelman II
- Henry Mulholland – Dr Peter Elliott
- Paul Newton – Kate and Barbie (A portrait of Kate Fischer)
- Rodney Pople – (Galbraith)
- Jenny Sages – Greg Weight making a portrait of Tom Bass
- Timothy Schultz – Odalisque – portrait of Wendy Sharpe
- Martin Sharp – Tiny Tim, Eternal Troubadour
- Garry Shead – Carpe(t) Diem – Adam Rish
- Jiawei Shen – Seven self-portraits (Highly commended) (Image)
- Kim Spooner – (Barrie Kosky) Expecting each moment to be his next
- Nigel Thomson – Barbara Blackman (Winner: Archibald Prize 1997) (Image)
- Imants Tillers – Portrait of a Chancellor (U.T.S)
- Greg Warburton – Genni Batterham OAM
- Dick Watkins – Des O'Brien
- Salvatore Zofrea – Summer of the Seventeenth Doll Opera

== See also ==
- Previous year: List of Archibald Prize 1996 finalists
- Next year: List of Archibald Prize 1998 finalists
- List of Archibald Prize winners
