= List of Archibald Prize 1999 finalists =

This is a list of finalists for the 1999 Archibald Prize for portraiture (listed is Artist – Title).

== Prize winners ==
The Prize winners were:

- Euan MacLeod – Self-portrait/head like a hole (Winner: Archibald Prize 1999)
- Deny Christian – Garry McDonald (Winner: Packing Room Prize 1999) (The 1999 Packing Room Prize winner was not selected as a finalist.)
- Evert Ploeg – Deborah Mailman (Winner: People's Choice)

Note that the Packing Room Prize winner was not a finalist.

== Finalists ==
- Rick Amor – Studio self-portrait
- Bruce Armstrong – Spook San (Gary James)
- Li (David) Baohua – Francis Giacco
- Krista Berga – Portrait of Paul Milliss
- David Bromley – Scott Hicks (film director)
- Tom Carment – James Scanlon
- Peter Churcher – John & Tikki
- Adam Cullen – Max Cullen
- Geoffrey Dyer – Margaret Scott (author and poet)
- Graham Fransella – Self Portrait
- Joe Furlonger – Self Portrait With Chinese Figure
- James P Gilmour – Simon Johnson PQF
- Robert Hannaford – Robert Dessaix (in my studio)
- Nicholas Harding – Portrait of Margaret Olley
- Amanda King – Natasha Stott Despoja (politician)
- Bill Leak – Sinclair Hill
- Kerrie Lester – Jimmy Barnes (singer)
- Keith Looby – Paddy McGuinness
- Mathew Lynn – Lucinda Moon
- Euan MacLeod – Self-portrait/head like a hole (Winner: Archibald Prize 1999)
- Carolyn McKay Creecy – Nigel Thomson
- Lewis Miller – Poppy King
- Henry Mulholland – Darren Knight
- David Naseby – Bob Ellis (political commentator)
- Paul Newton – Portrait of Maggie Tabberer (model)
- John Peart – Elisabeth Cummings
- Evert Ploeg – Deborah Mailman (actress) (Winner: People's Choice)
- Sally Robinson – Tony Tan
- Jenny Sages – Meryl Tankard
- Jiawei Shen – William Yang
- Patrick Shirvington – Charles Blackman (Secret of the Golden Flower)
- Salvatore Zofrea – James Strong

== See also ==
- Previous year: List of Archibald Prize 1998 finalists
- Next year: List of Archibald Prize 2000 finalists
- List of Archibald Prize winners
