= List of Archibald Prize 2003 finalists =

This is a list of finalists for the 2003 Archibald Prize for portraiture (listed is Artist – Title).

== Finalists ==
- Davida Allen – Philip Bacon, art dealer; reading a letter from Barry...
- Rick Amor – Portrait of Lewis Miller
- Danelle Bergstrom – Conversation with Margaret Olley
- Warren Breninger – Self-portrait
- Peter Churcher – Loti and Victor Smorgon
- Kevin Connor – Self-portrait
- Adam Cullen – Jimmy Little
- Lucy Culliton – Self with subject (cock)
- Geoffrey Dyer – Richard Flanagan (Winner: Archibald Prize 2003)
- Martine Emdur – Claudia Karvan, Interior
- David Fairbairn – Auto portrait DF
- Julie Fragar – J. Lucy in quinachridone magenta
- Robert Hannaford – Rabbi Apple
- Nicholas Harding – Portrait of Margaret Whitlam A.O.
- Ray Lawrence – Self
- Mathew Lynn – Hetti Perkins
- Lewis Miller – Hazel
- Henry Mulholland – Dr Peter Elliott at home
- David Naseby – Adam Cullen
- Paul Procèe – PCD 2K03 (from the Faces series)
- Jenny Sages – True Stories – Helen Garner
- Ian Smith – Ray Hughes having pre-dinner drinks with Ambroise Vollard...
- Nick Stathopoulos – Here's Mr. Squiggle
- Andrew Sullivan – The forgotten soldier
- Branca Uzur – Sandra Levy
- Ilya Volykhine – Coffee with Ken Unsworth
- John R Walker – John Wolseley
- Greg Warburton – Self portrait in Da Vinci T-Shirt
- Jan Williamson – Rachel Ward (Winner: Packing Room Prize 2003)
- Susan Wyatt – Doris Pilkington (Nugi Garimarra)
- Huihai Xie – Bannerman
- Dalu Zhao – 'Lao Fei' Stephen Fitzgerald (Winner: People's Choice 2003)

== See also ==
- Previous year: List of Archibald Prize 2002 finalists
- Next year: List of Archibald Prize 2004 finalists
- List of Archibald Prize winners
