= List of Archibald Prize 2002 finalists =

This is a list of finalists for the 2002 Archibald Prize for portraiture (listed is Artist – Title).

== Finalists ==
- Bruce Armstrong – Stuart Purves
- David Bromley – Charles Blackman
- Tom Carment – Richard Neville
- Peter Churcher – Monique
- Adam Cullen – Mark Brandon Read – author
- Julie Dowling – Henry
- Geoffrey Dyer – The last survivor Alec Campbell
- Esther Erlich – Deborah Conway
- Neil Evans – Reflective self-portrait
- David Fairbairn – Dottore Vincenzo Blefari – mascherato Dottore Vincenzo Blefari – smascherato
- Garry Foye – Portrait of Dr. Henry Stenning
- Robert Hannaford – Lynda Syddick Napaltjarri
- Nicholas Harding – Rusty Peters
- Brent Harris – Leo Schofield
- Cherry Hood – Simon Tedeschi unplugged (Winner: Archibald Prize 2002)
- James Hunt – Bora – (Anthony Mundine)
- Lindy Lee – Roslyn Oxley
- Kerrie Lester – Interrupting Mr Smart!
- Mathew Lynn – Anna Volska
- Lewis Miller – Portrait of Stephen Feneley
- Paul Newton – Portrait of Fred Street AM
- Angus Nivison – Annie Lewis, September 2001
- Stephen Nothling – Self portrait thinking about painting a portrait of Eva Breuer to enter into the Archibald Prize
- Carmel O'Connor – Portrait of Professor Bernard Smith
- Mary Pinnock – Martin Sharp
- Paul Ryan – Richard, arms folded
- Jenny Sages – Ros and Joe
- Jiawei Shen – The lady from Shanghai (Jenny Sages)
- Paul Thomas Vrondidis – Painting pears
- Dick Watkins – David Moore
- Jan Williamson – Jenny Morris – singer/songwriter

== See also ==
- Previous year: List of Archibald Prize 2001 finalists
- Next year: List of Archibald Prize 2003 finalists
- List of Archibald Prize winners
