= List of Archibald Prize 1998 finalists =

This is a list of finalists for the 1998 Archibald Prize for portraiture (listed is Artist – Title).

- Rick Amor – Portrait of Bruce Pollard
- Danelle Bergstrom – JF-S transposition
- Steve Bowden – Images in the mirror
- Warren Breninger – Self-portrait – January 1998
- Judy Cassab – John Wolseley
- Robert Clinch – Sir William Dargie
- Kevin Connor – Portrait of Jan Senbergs, painter
- Adam Cullen – Portrait of Frank Moorhouse AM (author)
- Paula Dawson – Sleeping man (Barry Jones politician)
- Graham Fransella – Self-portrait
- Joe Furlonger – Self-portrait – artist painting landscape
- Robert Hannaford – Paul Keating (Former Prime Minister)
- Robert Hannaford – Rolf Prince (Winner: People's Choice Award 1998)
- Nicholas Harding – Margaret Olley 1998
- He Huang – Artist Daniel H Kojta
- Bill Leak – Gough Whitlam (Former Prime Minister)
- Kerrie Lester – Self-portrait as a bridesmaid (Winner: Packing Room Prize 1998)
- Mathew Lynn – Guan Wei
- Lewis Miller – Portrait of Allan Mitelman no 3 (Winner: Archibald Prize 1998) {Image)
- Henry Mulholland – Peter Shortland and Vince
- David Naseby – Les Murray (poet)
- Angus Nivison – Portrait of Chandler Coventry
- John Peart – Margaret Tuckson
- Jenny Sages – Nobody's daughter – Meme Thorne
- Jiawei Shen – Eyewitness (portrait of George Gittoes AM, artist) (Image)
- Rosemary Valadon – The dove and the cross – portrait of Rev Rod Pattenden
- Dick Watkins – Rollin Schlicht
- Bryan Westwood – Donald Horne AO
- Salvatore Zofrea – Ken Borda

== See also ==
- Previous year: List of Archibald Prize 1997 finalists
- Next year: List of Archibald Prize 1999 finalists
- List of Archibald Prize winners
