= Joel West =

American actor and model (born 1975)

- Born: April 6, 1975 (age 51); Indianola, Iowa
- Other name: Baby Marcus
- Education: Buena Vista University
- Occupations: actor, model
- Height: 1.87 m (6 ft 2 in)
- Spouse: Anna Bocci (2 children)

Joel West (born April 6, 1975) is an American actor and model, known for his work as a top male model in the 1990s and his television and film career.

== Early life ==
Joel West was born in Indianola, Iowa. His mother, Jan Gipple, is a veterinary technician, and his father is Rob West; the parents divorced in 1989. He was raised on a 60-acre horse ranch in Indianola and attended Indianola High School. He attended Buena Vista University.

== Modeling career ==
West began modeling at age 17 and was discovered by a local photographer at the Mall of America. He became one of the top male supermodels of the 1990s, known for an exclusive contract with Calvin Klein for several seasons. He has worked for major fashion houses including Versace and Hugo Boss, and was represented by Boss Models, the same agency that represented Marcus Schenkenberg, the first male supermodel. Notably, he walked in the Versace show in Milan and worked with renowned photographers including Richard Avedon and Herb Ritts.

He is signed to Nous Model Management in Los Angeles and formerly to Hello Models NYC in New York City.

== Acting career ==
West has appeared in numerous television and film productions, including recurring roles in CSI: Miami, Heroes, and Days of Our Lives.

== Personal life ==
West has been married to actress Anna Bocci since August 2002 and they have two children. His younger brother, Jake West, is a brain surgeon in Florida.

== Filmography ==
Year	Title	Role	Notes
1991	Crack Me Up	John	
2000	The Smokers	Christopher	
2000	The Giving Tree aka Brutal Truth	Kyle	
2000	Krocodylus	Jeremy	
2001	The Elite	Joel	
2002	Felicity	Rocco	Episode: "Kiss and Tell"
2002	Charmed	Malek	Episode: "Long Live the Queen", Uncredited
2002	Scorcher	Zero	
2002	Con Express	Zednik	
2002	Global Effect	Nile Spencer	
2003-2006	CSI: Miami	Officer Aaron Jessop / Officer Ramirez	10 episodes
2004	American Dreams	Staff Sgt. Finch	Episode: "The 7-10 Split"
2004	The Division	Chris	Episode: "Be Careful What You Wish For"
2004	Star Trek: Enterprise	Raakin	Episode: "Borderland"
2005	All Features Great and Small	Slickster Filmmaker	Short
2005	Extreme Makeover: Wedding Edition	Himself / Carpenter	TV special
2007	Starting Out in the Evening	Waiter	
2010	The Disciple	Jesus Christ	
2011	Design on a Dime	Himself / Carpenter	
