= Alice Spigelman =

Australian clinical psychologist, writer and human rights advocate

Alice Eve-Marie Spigelman AM is a Hungarian-born Australian clinical psychologist, writer and human rights advocate. She was previously chair of Sculpture by the Sea. Her most recent book is The Budapest Job, a thriller set in 1989, at the time of the collapse of the Soviet Union. She has written a play A Kind of Reunion, to be premiered in Sydney, NSW in December 2020.

== Early life and education ==
Spigelman was born in Hungary and came to Sydney with her family in 1956. On arrival in Sydney, with little English, she started school at Santa Sabina College. She has a BA and MA and a postgraduate Diploma in Clinical Psychology from the University of Sydney.

== Career ==
Following publication of her biography of architect Harry Seidler, Spigelman gave a speech on him at The Sydney Institute in April 2011 which was subsequently published in Sydney Papers, vol. 13, no. 2 in 2001.

Spigelman was, at one time, marketing director of The Benevolent Society, director of the Bundanon Trust, National Institute of Dramatic Art, Australian Institute of Music and the Rural Leadership Program. She became a director of Australia for UNHCR in February 2006 and was chair of the Women's Projects Committee in 2014. Spigelman was a member of the Advisory Council, Faculty of Built Environment at the University of New South Wales. She is also a member of the advisory board of the Kinchela Boys Home Aboriginal Corporation, which helps members of the Stolen Generation to take control of their future.

Spigelman joined the Board of Sculpture by the Sea in 2010 and became chair in 2016.

== Awards and recognition ==
In the 2012 Queen's Birthday Honours Spigelman was made a Member of the Order of Australia (AM) for "service to the community as an advocate for human rights and social justice, particularly for women and refugees, and through contributions to cultural organisations".

== Works ==
=== Nonfiction ===
- Almost Full Circle: Harry Seidler: A biography, Brandl & Schlesinger, 2001 ISBN 978-1876040154

=== Fiction ===
- The Budapest Job, Brandl & Schlesinger, 2018 ISBN 978-0648202653
- A Kind of Reunion, play
- Her Brilliant Career, a play about Miles Franklin, staged readings at the State Library of NSW

== Personal ==
She is the wife of James Spigelman, former Chief Justice of New South Wales, former Chairman of the Australian Broadcasting Corporation. Former prime minister Malcolm Turnbull was best man at their wedding in Paris. Garry Shead's portrait of Spigelman was a finalist for the 1994 Archibald Prize.
