= Good Looking (disambiguation) =

Good Looking may refer to:

- Good Looking Records, record label of LTJ Bukem

== See also ==
- Looking Good, an Australian television programme hosted by Deborah Hutton
- Beauty
