= List of Archibald Prize 2000 finalists =

This is a list of finalists for the 2000 Archibald Prize for portraiture (listed is Artist – Title).

== Finalists ==
As well as the usual Archibald with its set criteria, there was a Sporting Archibald which had a focus on sport due to the 2000 Sydney Olympics.

- Chris Antico – The Captain: Mark Taylor (cricket captain)
- Michael Bell – The Sandman (comedian Steve Abbott)
- Simon Benz – Anna Wilson (cyclist)
- Melissa Beowulf – Ken Done (painter)
- David Bromley – Strongest man of the games (Dean Lukin, weightlifter)
- Tom Carment – Presbyterian self-portrait
- Tom Carment – Don Idle, footballer
- Adam Cullen – Portrait of David Wenham (Winner: Archibald Prize 2000)
- Adam Cullen – Portrait of Mark Occhilupo (surfer)
- Max Cullen – Geoffrey Rush (actor)
- Elisabeth Cummings – May Barrie
- Geoffrey Dyer – Christopher Koch (author)
- Esther Erlich – Never been better
- David Fairbairn – Portrait of Victoria Hahn
- Nic Fern – Vicki Wilson (netball)
- Julie Fragar – Self-portrait with the artist: Julie Fragar, Chuck Close and security
- Nicholas Harding – Portrait of John Bell
- Juliet Holmes a Court – Portrait of George (George Gregan, rugby player)
- Colin Husband – Paul Bennett
- Glenda Jones – Nova Peris-Kneebone (Gold Medalist with Australian Hockey Team)
- Robin Lawrence – Andrea Durbach
- Bill Leak – 'Are you with me': portrait of Sir Les Patterson
- Kerrie Lester – Susie Maroney, True Blue Sue (swimmer)
- Barbara Licha – Smile
- Keith Looby – Anne Summers (journalist)
- Mathew Lynn – Dr John Yu
- Lewis Miller – Ronald Dale Barassi (AFL footballer)
- Lewis Miller – Self-portrait
- Ann Morton – Edwin Carr 'Old Gold' (athletics)
- Henry Mulholland – Padriac P. McGuinness
- David Naseby – Kostya Tszyu (boxer)
- Paul Newton – Portrait of David Campese (rugby player)
- Evert Ploeg – Louise Sauvage (wheelchair athlete)
- Jenny Sages – Each morning when I wake up I put on my mother's face
- Garry Shead – Sasha Grishin (art critic)
- Andrew Sibley – Marilyn Peddell (lawnbowls)
- Ian Smith – Ray Hughes getting his desserts
- Michael Snape – Stephen Mori
- Kim Spooner – 'blue' (Kerry O'Brien)
- Anne Spudvilas – Leigh Hobbs
- Ann Thomson – Portrait of the artist as a painting
- Branca Uzur – Paul Byrnes
- John R Walker – William Wright
- Peter Wegner – Portrait of Professor Graeme Clark
- Peter Wegner – Portrait of Darren Gauci (jockey)
- Jan Williamson – Tom Carroll (surfer)
- Louise Wood – Determination – Michael Klim (swimmer)
- Huihai Xie – Johnny Raper – A living legend (rugby league player)

== See also ==
- Previous year: List of Archibald Prize 1999 finalists
- Next year: List of Archibald Prize 2001 finalists
- List of Archibald Prize winners
