= Tziporah Malkah =

Australian model and actress

- Born: Katherine Helen Fischer; 30 November 1973 (age 52); Adelaide, South Australia, Australia
- Occupations: Model, actress, TV host
- Years active: 1987–Present
- Mother: Pru Goward

Tziporah Atarah Malkah (born Katherine Helen Fischer; 30 November 1973) is an Australian model, actress and TV host. Initially rising to prominence under her birth name Kate Fischer, Malkah began modelling in the 1980s, becoming a glamour model by the early 1990s, later resulting in an acting and television presenting career.

== Early life ==
Katherine Helen Fischer was born on 30 November 1973 at the Queen Victoria Hospital in Adelaide, South Australia, the daughter of future Liberal politician Pru Goward and university economics lecturer Alastair Fischer. Her sister Penny was born two years later. The family lived in Adelaide until 1983, when her mother moved to Sydney for her television career leaving the children with their father. The marriage broke up soon after and the two girls moved to Canberra with their mother, who married journalist David Barnett in 1986.

Malkah attended Canberra Church of England Girls' Grammar School and Narrabundah College, before leaving school at fifteen to pursue her modelling career.

== Modelling ==
In 1987, at the age of 13, Malkah won the Dolly Covergirl of the Year competition and was touted as the next big Australian supermodel. At the peak of her career, she was considered to be "one of Australia's most photographed women".

In 1988 she appeared in a Nescafe cinema release only commercial also featuring INXS. By the early 1990s, she had become a model working in Sydney and New York, where she had moved to aged sixteen in 1990. She did shoots for Bloomingdales, Glamor magazine and Mademoiselle, and was featured on the covers of Dolly, Cleo, Elle, Follow Me, Black + White magazine and Vogue Australia.

In 2000 she made a TV commercial for Leggos pasta sauce, speaking in Italian throughout. Leggos made a series of commercials starring "iconic Australians", including Gough Whitlam, Shane Warne, Kerri Anne Kennerly and Malkah.

In 2005–2006, Malkah was the face of AMP Capital Shopping Centres in Australia.

== Film and television ==
In 1994, Malkah had a role in the Australian film Sirens alongside Elle Macpherson, Portia de Rossi, Sam Neill, Hugh Grant and Ben Mendelsohn as one of the three life models of painter Norman Lindsay.

In 1994, Malkah and Sirens co-star Portia de Rossi made an HIV/AIDS awareness advert for The Albion Street Centre.

In 1995, Malkah was recruited for an ongoing role in the Network 10 TV soap opera Echo Point which aired for six months. She appeared in several of the Elle McFeast (Libbi Gorr) comedy specials on ABC TV such as Breasts (1996) and The Whitlam Dismissal (1996).

For two years (1996–1997), Malkah was the host of the Looney Tunes cartoon show What's Up Doc? on the Nine Network. In 1996, she was nominated for the Most Popular New Talent award at the Logie Awards. In 1997, she had a small part in the Australian film Dust Off the Wings, a drama set amidst Sydney's surfing culture. In 2000, she starred in the horror film Blood Surf, filmed in the Philippines.

In 2001 she fronted the Channel 10 television special Kate Fischer's Myth of the Perfect Woman.

Malkah starred as a blind girl who is courted by a struggling comedian in the Australian film comedy The Real Thing (2002) In 2002, she appeared in three episodes of the Channel 7 medical drama series All Saints.

In 2005, Malkah appeared on the Nine Network's Celebrity Overhaul, a show in which celebrities try to regain their fitness through good diet and exercise habits.

In 2006, Malkah made a guest appearance on the first series of The Chaser's War on Everything on ABC TV and also became the host of a limited-run series weekly clip show Top 40 Celebrity Countdown on the Seven Network.

In 2007, she filmed a short comedy video, Supermodel Hotdog, which aired on YouTube. The sketch, filmed at her LA apartment, self-satirised her image as a celebrity and movie star.

In 2017, she was a contestant on the third season of the Australian version of I'm a Celebrity...Get Me Out of Here!, where she lived in the African jungle along with other celebrities. She was the third contestant eliminated, spending four weeks in the jungle, and was described as one of the seasons "standout characters" due to the frank nature of her remarks.

== Personal life ==
Around 1993, Malkah entered a relationship with James Packer, the billionaire heir to the Packer family which controlled Publishing and Broadcasting Limited, including the subsidiary Nine Network, one of Australia's largest television networks. They were engaged from 1996 to 1998. In 2024, Malkah stated that "she had never been engaged to any man and would no longer tolerate being defined by a man."

Following the end of her relationship with Packer, Malkah moved to Los Angeles to pursue an acting career, where she spent 13 years, but eventually fell into a period of financial hardship and returned to Australia, for a time becoming homeless, and eventually ended up working as a care assistant in a nursing home.

Malkah has said she legally changed her name to Tziporah Malkah in her early 20s, after embracing her Jewish heritage. According to The Daily Telegraph, in a 2020 court filing her legal name was given as "Katherine Fischer".

Malkah has been estranged from her mother Pru Goward for many years, saying in 2017, "It has always been quite a difficult relationship."

In 2022, Malkah was found guilty of breaching a court order that prohibited her from posting online any information about a particular man.

== Filmography ==
- Sirens (1993, film) as Pru
- Full Moon, Dirty Hearts by INXS (1993 music video)
- Echo Point (1995, TV series)
- Full Frontal (1995, TV series) as Guest
- What’s Up Doc? (1996–97, TV series) as host
- Good News Week (1996-96, S1-2) as Panellist
- Elle McFeast Special: Breasts (1996, TV special) as Guest
- Elle McFeast Special: The Whitlam Dismissal (1996, TV special) as Guest
- Twisted Tales (1996, TV series, 1 episode)
- The Munsters Scary Little Christmas (1996, TV movie)
- Dust Off the Wings (1997, film)
- Pigeon (1998, film)
- Murder Call (1998, TV series, S2E18: Bone Dead)
- Blood Surf (2000, film) as Cecily Herrold
- All Saints (2002, TV series, 3 episodes)
- The Real Thing (2002, film)
- The Foreigner (2003, film)
- Celebrity Overhaul (2005, TV series, S2) as Contestant
- The Chaser's War on Everything (2005, TV series) as Guest
- Top 40 Celebrity Countdown (2006, TV series) as Host
- It Takes Two (2006 TV series, S1) - Contestant (eliminated third
- I'm a Celebrity... Get Me Out of Here! (2017, TV series, S3) as Contestant

== Cultural references ==
In 1997, "Kate and Barbie", a portrait of Malkah by Australian painter Paul Newton was a finalist in the annual Archibald Prize exhibition and is now in her private art collection. Newton also painted another portrait of Malkah the same year titled "Homage to Madame X", now owned by her mother, Pru Goward. David Bromley painted her portrait in 2001.

In 1998 Australian band TISM released a song Kate, "Fischer of Men," about Malkah.
