= Sister Mary Brady =

Australian portrait and landscape painter

- Born: 1922; Tamworth
- Died: 2014
- Occupations: Painter, religious sister
- Awards: Portia Geach Memorial Award (1966); Portia Geach Memorial Award (1971); Portia Geach Memorial Award (1975)

Sister Mary Brady (1922–2014) was an Australian portrait artist and Dominican sister. A three-time winner of the Portia Geach Memorial Award for portraiture, Brady was also a regular finalist in the Archibald, Sulman and Wynne Prizes.

== Early life ==
Born in Tamworth in 1922 to saddler, John Brady and dressmaker, Emily Loder she extensively practiced painting through self-study, although received critiques from well-known artists such as Joshua Smith and Norman Carter throughout her career.

Under the encouragement of the then Director of the Art Gallery of New South Wales, Hal Missingham, she first entered her work in the Archibald Prize in 1947. Following her family's move to Sydney in 1950, she became more active in the art community, showcasing her work with the Contemporary Art Society and Blaxland Galleries.

When in her late teens whilst volunteering for the Red Cross, she met Mother Margaret Mary Lyons who recognised and encouraged her talent. Brady's mentorship under Mother Margaret Mary Lyons helped shape her career and led to influential connections in the art community. In 1967, she entered the Dominican Order. She continued to paint under her name 'Mary Brady' but became known as Sister Margaret Mary in Dominican circles.

== Career ==
Brady won the Portia Geach Prize three times in the years 1966, 1971, and 1975. She was also a finalist in the Archibald Prize from 1946 to 1966, often with two entries. In 1964 Brady was awarded the Hunters Hill Prize for Landscape, highlighting her skills beyond portraiture.

Over her lifetime, Brady has painted many well known Australians including George Johnston, Manning Clark, Bernard Mills, Barbara Holborow, Miriam Hyde (1985), and Larry Sitsky (1971). Some of her paintings are held in the collections of the National Portrait Gallery, National Library of Australia, Art Gallery of New South Wales, and many other public and private collections.

In 2010 Brady's painting “Mary MacKillop Friend and Educator to the Poor” was chosen by the Sisters of St Joseph to officially represent St Mary MacKillop's canonisation, and is used extensively to illustrate their faith in their schools in Australasia.

Sister Mary Brady died in 2014.
