= My Wicked, Wicked Ways: The Legend of Errol Flynn =

1985 TV movie

- Genre: Biopic
- Written by: Doris Keating; Jill Trump; James Lee; Don Taylor
- Directed by: Don Taylor
- Starring: Duncan Regehr; Barbara Hershey
- Country of origin: United States
- Original language: English

Production
- Producer: Doris Keating
- Cinematography: James Glennon
- Production company: CBS Entertainment Productions

Original release
- Network: CBS
- Release: January 21, 1985

My Wicked, Wicked Ways is a 1985 American TV movie based on My Wicked, Wicked Ways, the best selling memoir of Errol Flynn, with Duncan Regehr as Flynn and Barbara Hershey as Lili Damita.

== Plot ==
In 1935 Errol Flynn arrives in Los Angeles to take up a contract with Warner Bros. He plays a corpse in The Case of the Curious Bride, which impresses Jack Warner enough to cast Flynn in the lead of Captain Blood. He falls in love with fading film star Lili Damita.

== Cast ==
- Duncan Regehr as Errol Flynn
- Barbara Hershey as Lili Damita
- Darren McGavin as Gerrit Koets
- Barrie Ingham as John Barrymore
- George Coe as Irving Jerome
- Hal Linden as Jack L. Warner
- Lee Purcell as Olivia de Havilland
- Michael Callan as Hal B. Wallis
- Stefan Gierasch as Michael Curtiz
- Michael C. Gwynne as Raoul Walsh
- Elissa Leeds as Bette Davis

== Background ==
Doris Keating, daughter of Barry Mahon, Flynn's one-time business manager, optioned the book in 1977. It took her several years to find funding.

"Some people at the networks felt maybe he just wasn't likable enough," Keating said, "But I persisted. I felt I owed it to him to present his story the way he wrote it. The film is my valentine to him."

She managed to get up the film as a TV movie for CBS. The project deliberately steered clear of any political controversies.

The lead role went to Canadian actor Duncan Regehr. He said he "didn't want to do an imitation of Flynn or mimic him in any way. I chose to do an interpretation, an attempt to capture his elegance and charm, the soul of the man."

The film focuses on the years 1935 to 1943, ending with trial for statutory rape. Regehr later said, "The movie does dribble away. But we chose to do it that way. He wanted to have a good time. He didn't understand why people didn't want him to do that. He never looked before he leaped. We leave him feeling terribly sad, in a state of confusion. Then again, he only wanted to live the first half of his life anyway."

Keating said if the film was successful she wanted to do a prequel about Flynn's life in New Guinea, but this did not eventuate.

== Reception ==
=== Critical ===
The New York Times said the events of Flynn's life "are woodenly re-enacted without a trace of the passion, adventure or sexiness that blurred the lines between the star's movie roles and off-screen personalities" and said Regehr "lacks Errol Flynn's edge of steel. The restless, amused predator, always poised for action, has become in Mr. Regehr's performance a smirking, doe-eyed lounge lizard - imperturbably polite and languid."

The Los Angeles Times called it "flat, clichéd, silly", which "reveals the veneer beneath the veneer."

=== Ratings ===
The film was screened in January, traditionally a low rating month, leading some observers to believe that CBS was "burying" it. The film did not rate well being the 40th highest rated show of its week. It was beaten by ABC's Scandal Sheet, which came 12th.
