= Duncan Regehr =

Canadian multimedia artist and actor (born 1952)

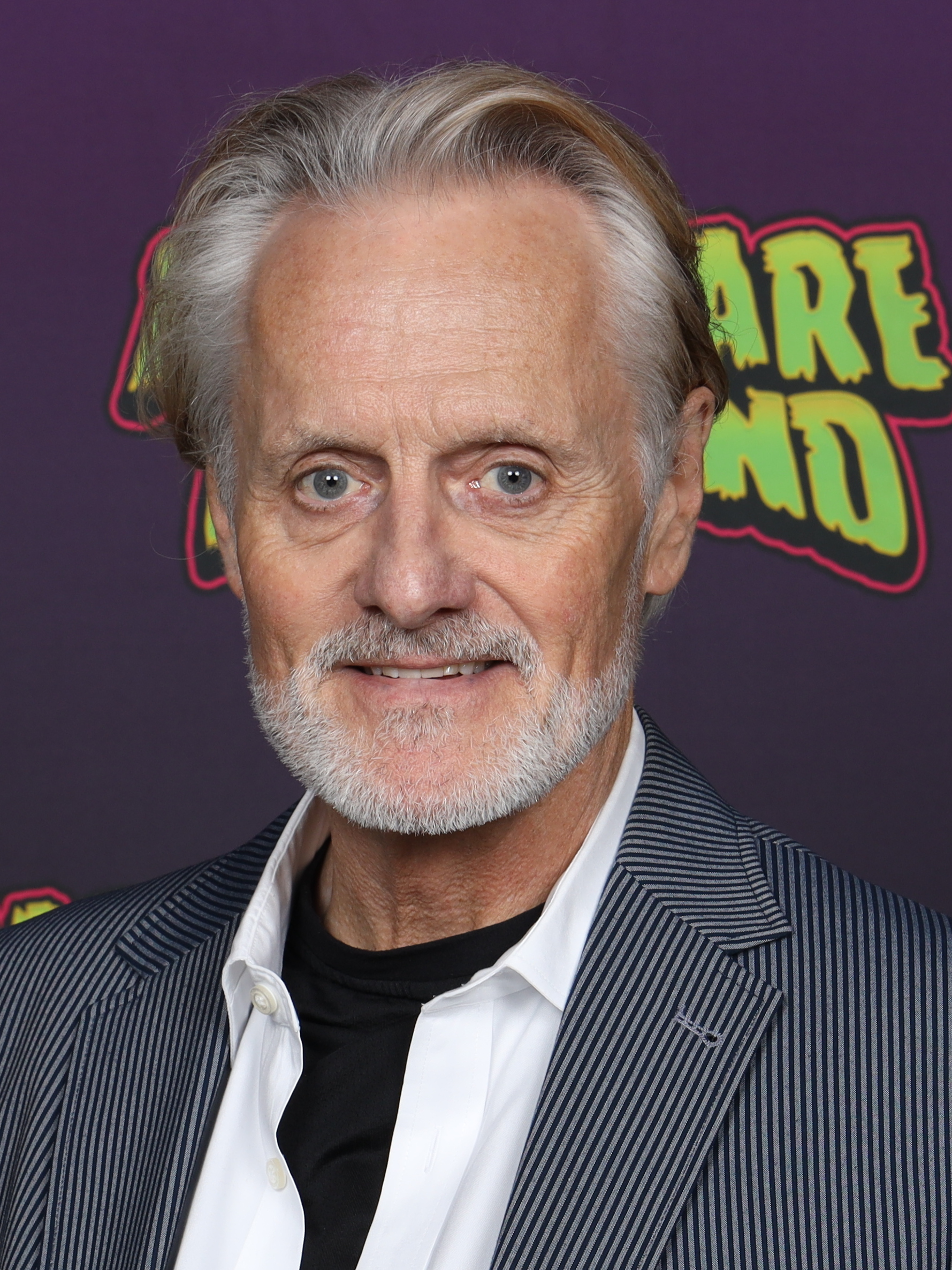
- Regehr in 2024
- Born: Duncan Peter Regehr; October 5, 1952 (age 73); Lethbridge, Alberta, Canada
- Website: www.duncanregehr.com

Duncan Peter Regehr RCA (born October 5, 1952) is a Canadian multimedia artist and actor. He was also a figure skater and a classically trained Shakespearean stage actor in his native Canada, before heading to Hollywood in 1980.

Regehr played the title character in Zorro, The Family Channel's television series based upon Johnston McCulley's classic hero. He also had roles in multiple television incarnations of Star Trek.

== Early life ==
Regehr was born in Lethbridge, Alberta, and raised in Victoria, British Columbia, Canada, to a British-born mother, Dorothy Mary (née Mulkern), and a Russian father, Peter Regehr, who was an artist. He was active in broadcasting at age 14, when he was host of a teenager-oriented talk show on the Canadian Broadcasting Corporation (CBC). As a high school student, he figure-skated in ice shows. He received early acting instruction at the Bastion Theater School in Victoria.

== Career ==
After numerous appearances in Canadian theatre, television (e.g., in the family TV show Matt and Jenny on the Wilderness Trail), and notable roles on radio for the CBC, he and his wife, Catherine, moved to Los Angeles, California, where he began to develop his work in film. Shortly after arriving, he was hired to play villain Prince Dirk Blackpool in the short-lived 1983 fantasy-comedy series Wizards and Warriors opposite Jeff Conaway's Prince Erik Greystone. He went on to star in many more US television films, including the 1984 television mini-series The Last Days of Pompeii, as Lydon, the gladiator; as Errol Flynn in the 1985 CBS film My Wicked, Wicked Ways, based on the autobiography of Flynn; and on the science fiction series V as the Visitor military leader Charles. He also starred in the 1982 mini-series The Blue and the Gray as Captain Randolph. In 1987, Regehr portrayed a dynamite-slinging Count Dracula in the film The Monster Squad.

In 1989 he starred as the villain in The Banker, which also starred Jeff Conaway.

One of Regehr's best-known roles to date was in Zorro as Don Diego De La Vega and his alter ego, the swashbuckling hero, Zorro. Regehr portrayed the masked hero for 88 episodes on The Family Channel from 1990 to 1993.

Regehr has also made numerous TV guest appearances. He was a guest actor on Cybill, Murder, She Wrote, Hotel and the seventh-season Star Trek: The Next Generation episode "Sub Rosa" as Ronin, a ghost who falls in love with Beverly Crusher. He also appeared in Star Trek: Deep Space Nine as Shakaar Edon.

Regehr has been painting and drawing since childhood. Regehr first exhibited his artwork in 1974 at the Stratford Festival in Ontario. The following year, he showed at the Yorkville Art Center in Toronto. Since then, he has had numerous exhibitions in Canada, Europe, and the United States. His work is found in collections worldwide, including the Jilin Collection (China), The Kunsthallen (Copenhagen), Focus on the Masters Archives for the Getty Museum (USA), and the Syllavethy Collection of Scotland (GB). Regehr's automonograph, The Dragon's Eye: An Artist's View, received international acclaim and was lauded by art critics and literary reviewers as a book of visual and poetic excellence. In 1996 he won the American Vision Award of Distinction in the Arts, and was granted the lifetime appellation 'Royal Canadian Artist' with honours in 2000 by the Royal Canadian Academy of Art for his outstanding artistic achievements.

On November 10, 2008, Regehr was awarded the honorary degree of Doctor of Fine Arts by the University of Victoria, in Victoria, British Columbia. Some of his art works are also displayed in art galleries in the region.

== Filmography ==
Film roles
Year	Film	Role	Notes
1981	Goliath Awaits	Paul Ryker	TV Movie
1985	My Wicked, Wicked Ways: The Legend of Errol Flynn	Errol Flynn	Playing Flynn, TV Movie
1987	The Monster Squad	Count Dracula	
1988	Earth Star Voyager	Jacob Dryden 'Jake' Brown	Shown on the Disney Sunday Movie
1989	Billy the Kid	Pat Garrett	
1989	The Banker	Spaulding Osbourne	
1995	Timemaster	Jonathan Adams	
2000	Air Bud: World Pup	Geoffrey Putter	
2000	Blood Surf	John Dirks	
2001	Flying Virus	Savior	
2005	Secret Lives	Mike	
2006	Presumed Dead	Seth Harmon	
2008	Nightmare at the End of the Hall	Mr. Ramsay	
2008	The Strange Case of DJ Cosmic	DJ Cosmic	
2009	The Good Times Are Killing Me	U.S. Senator Sam Talbot	

Television roles
Year	Title	Role	Notes
1979–80	Matt and Jenny	Kit	Main cast
1981	The Greatest American Hero	Palmer Bradshaw	Episode: "The Best Desk Scenario"
1982	The Blue and the Gray	Captain Randolph	Miniseries
1983	Wizards and Warriors	Dirk Blackpool, Crown Prince of Karteia	Main cast
1984	The Last Days of Pompeii	Lydon	Miniseries
1984–85	V	Charles	4 episodes
1990–93	Zorro	Zorro	Title role
1994	Star Trek: The Next Generation	Ronin	Episode: "Sub Rosa"
1995–97	Star Trek: Deep Space Nine	Shakaar	3 episodes
1997–98	Fast Track	Christian Chandler Jr.	Main cast
