= List of Archibald Prize 2012 finalists =

This is a list of finalists for the 2012 Archibald Prize for portraiture. As the images are copyrighted, an external link to an image has been listed where available (listed is Artist – Title).

- Vernon Ah Kee – I see Deadly people, Lex Wotton
- Monika Behrens – The artist’s practice (Self-portrait)
- Kate Beynon – Lindy Lee (Year of the Dragon)
- Natasha Bieniek – Fluoroscuro (Self-portrait) (Image)
- Marcus Callum – Self-portrait (Image)
- Adam Chang – Emile Sherman (Image)
- Jun Chen – John Yu with artist (Image)
- Luke Cornish – Father Bob (Bob Maguire) (Image)
- Adam Cullen – Nelson and Koko (Nelson Woss) (Image)
- Jodi Daley – Foras admonitio, Private X
- Melissa Egan – Old master, Charles Blackman
- Robin Eley – Bibliography (Self-portrait)
- David Fairbairn – Large head JB no. 1 (with blue ground) (James Barker) (Image)
- Vincent Fantauzzo – Kimbra (the build up) (Image)
- Juan Ford – Ultrapilgrim (Self-portrait)
- Benjamin Hedstrom – Annandale band meeting
- Jeremy Kibel – Jeremy Kibel – self-portrait (Image)
- "Archibald Prize | Archibald Prize 2012 finalists". The Australian. Archived from the original on March 4, 2016. Rhys Lee – Self-portrait with shiny cardboard armour (Image).
- Angus McDonald – Tim Maguire
- Tim McMonagle – Michael Buxton (Image)
- Nigel Milsom – Untitled (Kerry Crowley)) (Image)
- Paul Newton – Portrait of David Gonski AC (Image)
- Michael Peck – Self-portrait in the image of my son (Image)
- Ben Quilty – Captain S after Afghanistan (Image)
- Reko Rennie – Hetti (Hetti Perkins) (Image)
- Leslie Rice – Seeking a change, Madame Lulu, bearded lady, becomes ‘Tattooed Suzie’ – portrait of Lucky ‘Diamond’ Rich (Image)
- Luke Roberts – In mob we trust (Richard Bell) (Image)
- Paul Ryan – Cullen – been feudin (Adam Cullen) (Image)
- Jenny Sages – After Jack (Self portrait) (Winner of the 2012 People's Choice Award) (Image)
- Wendy Sharpe – Self-portrait in Antarctica with penguin and Mawson’s huts
- Martin Sharp – The thousand dollar bill (Portrait of David Gulpilil) (Image)
- Raelene Sharp – A strength of character (Portrait of John Wood) (Winner of the 2012 Packing Room Prize) (Image)
- Garry Shead – Martin Sharp and his magic theatre (Image)
- Jiawei Shen – Homage to Esben Storm (Image)
- Gary Smith and Frank Thirion – The faceless men
- Nick Stathopoulos – Art does belong. Portrait of Fenella Kernebone (Image)
- Tim Storrier – The Histrionic Wayfarer (after Bosch) (Self-portrait) (Winner of the 2012 Archibald Prize) (Image)
- Kate Tucker – Melody (you’re the only one who saves me) – portrait of Missy Higgins (Image)
- Michael Vale – Night of the wolverine – a portrait of Dave Graney and Clare Moore (Image)
- Craig Waddell – I see myself in you – self-portrait
- Rose Wilson – Brother of John (Portrait of Dan Flynn) (Image)

== See also ==
- Previous year: List of Archibald Prize 2011 finalists
- Next year: List of Archibald Prize 2013 finalists
- List of Archibald Prize winners
