= Robin Eley =

Australian hyperrealist painter

Robin Eley (born in London, England in 1978) is an Australian hyperrealist painter.

== Personal life ==
Eley was born to an Australian father and Chinese mother. In 1981 his family migrated to Australia where he completed his secondary education at Pembroke School. In 1997 he moved to the United States where he would attend Westmont College, captaining the basketball team and earning a bachelor of arts degree, majoring in fine art in 2001.

== Exhibitions ==
Eley is currently represented by Hill Smith Gallery in Australia and 101/exhibit in the United States. He has held two solo exhibitions at Hill Smith Gallery. In 2012, his debut solo exhibition "Singularity" sold out prior to the opening. His second solo exhibition "Idolatry" opened at Hill Smith Gallery in June, 2013. He has also participated in several group exhibitions, most notably "Chinese Australia" at Ausin Tung Gallery in Melbourne, Australia in 2012, "Journeys - Westmont Alumni Artists Invitational" at The Westmont Ridley-Tree Museum of Art in Santa Barbara, CA, USA in 2012, "BMG - First Look" at Bernarducci Meisel Gallery in New York, NY, USA in 2013 and Koi No Yokan at 101/exhibit in Los Angeles, CA, USA in 2013.

== Work ==
His work was recently recognized in the Doug Moran National Portrait Prize (highly commended runner-up in 2010 and highly commended 3rd place in 2011). He was a finalist in the Archibald Prize in 2012. His debut solo exhibition Singularity recently concluded at Hill Smith Gallery in South Australia.

== Awards and Grants ==
Eley has been a finalist in numerous Australian art prizes, most notably Runner Up (2010) and Highly Commended (2011) in the Doug Moran National Portrait Prize, the world's richest prize for portraiture. In addition, he has also been a finalist in the Archibald Prize (2012), the Eutick Memorial Still Life Art Prize (2010, 2012) and the Nora Heysen Still Life Art Award (2011). In 2012 he was the recipient of an International Presentation Grant from Arts SA which enabled him to accept an invitation to travel to the United States to exhibit his work at the Westmont Ridley-Tree Museum of Art in Santa Barbara, California. His work is also included in the museum's permanent collection.

== See also ==
- Hyperrealism
