= Celebrity Overhaul =

- Genre: Reality Television
- Presented by: Deborah Hutton
- Country of origin: Australia
- No. of seasons: 2

Production
- Production location: Thailand
- Production company: Fremantle Media

Original release
- Network: Nine Network
- Release: 13 February 2005 – 1 January 2007

Related
- Overhaul

Celebrity Overhaul is a reality television and infotainment show on Australia's Nine Network in which celebrities undergo a rigorous exercise and diet regime aimed at improving their fitness, health and general lifestyle, with the particular goal of weight loss. These are coordinated by two personal trainers and a medical doctor. Hosted by Deborah Hutton, there have been two seasons that aired in 2005 and 2007, each comprising five 1-hour episodes.

The show was co-created by Nine producers Julian Cress and David Barbour, who also created The Block, and was based on an idea from programming director Michael Healy.

== Featured celebrities ==
- Merv Hughes – cricketer (seasons 1 and 2)
- Paulini Curuenavuli – singer and Australian Idol contestant.
- Rowena Wallace – actress (season 1)
- Kate Fischer – model/former actress (season 2)
- Ita Buttrose – journalist/businesswoman (season 2)
- Phil Burton – singer (Human Nature) (season 2)
- Fabio Lanzoni – model and actor
- Trevor Butler – Big Brother reality show contestant
- Melissa Bell – actress and singer
- Nova Peris – athlete and politician
- Peter Phelps – actor
- Dr John Tickell – media personality, television presenter/doctor

== Ratings ==
Celebrity Overhaul became the most successful Australian debut during the 2005 ratings season. All five of the episodes from the first season won their time period, and averaged 1.6 million viewers.

== Spin-off ==
Channel Nine spun another show from Celebrity Overhaul, known simply as Overhaul, which followed a similar format, except it did not feature celebrities.
