= Geoffrey Proud =

Australian artist

- Born: 12 July 1946; Semaphore, Adelaide, South Australia, Australia
- Died: 23 May 2022; Huonville, Tasmania, Australia
- Awards: Sulman Prize; 1975 Untitled Jane; Archibald Prize; 1990 Dorothy Hewett

Geoffrey Robert Proud was an Australian artist. Although he received no formal training, Proud held his first solo exhibition at the age of sixteen. Throughout his lifetime, his work was exhibited in all Australian states, with over 80 solo exhibitions and in excess of 100 group exhibitions to his credit. Though he is best known for his painting, he also gained significant attention for etchings, lithographs and sculptural work.

== Awards ==
Proud was awarded many prestigious prizes throughout his career, including the Sulman Prize in 1975, and Australia's most prestigious prize for portraiture the Archibald Prize in 1990 for his portrait of writer Dorothy Hewett. He has had his work consistently displayed in all state capitals since 1965.

Proud was also the recipient of the Sydney Georges Art Prize, Melbourne 1976 (acquisition); La Trobe Valley Purchase Prize 1976; Coffs Harbour Art Purchase Prize 1977, George Crouch Golden Jubilee Invitation 1977, Ballarat; Darnell de Gruchy Purchase, Qld 1977; Gosford Art Prize in 1994.

Geoffrey Proud has art work represented at: the Australian National Gallery; Art Gallery of Western Australia; Artbank Collection; Horsham Art Gallery in Victoria; Armidale City Art Gallery in Armidale, NSW; La Trobe Valley Art Centre in Victoria; Newcastle Region Art Gallery; NSW State Parliament Offices; Visual Art Board, Australia Council; Parliament House Offices in Canberra; the Darling Harbour Authority in Sydney; NSW Bar Association, Sydney; Royal Sydney Golf Club, Sydney; NRMA Collection, Sydney; Westmead Hospital, Sydney; Allen Allen & Hemsley, New York; IBM Collections in Brisbane, Sydney and Canberra; Elton John Collection, London; Hyatt Regency, Coolum, Qld; Sly & Weigall, Sydney; Freehill, Hollingdale & Page; Melbourne; Vigilant Insurance, Sydney; Jones Lang & Wootton, Sydney; Arthur Anderson & Co., Sydney, the University of New England; Sydney Convention Centre, the University of the Sunshine Coast.

== Personal life ==
Proud's younger brother was the singer-songwriter, poet, novelist and dramatist Pip Proud.

== See also ==
- List of Archibald Prize winners

Awards
| Preceded by Bryan Westwood | Archibald Prize; 1990 for Dorothy Hewett | Succeeded by Bryan Westwood |
