= Jenny Sages =

Australian artist (born 1933)

- Born: 1933 (age 92–93); Shanghai, China
- Education: Sydney Girls' High School, East Sydney Technical College, New York Franklin School of Art, John Olsen and Mary White's School
- Known for: Landscape painting, portrait, encaustic painting
- Spouse: Jack Sages (m. 1955; died 2010)

Jenny Sages (born 1933 in Shanghai, China) is an Archibald Prize People's Choice Award winning Australian artist. She is known for her abstract landscape paintings and portraits. She arrived in Australia in 1948. After being expelled from East Sydney Technical College, Jenny moved to New York to study at Franklin School of Art. She was a freelance writer and illustrator for Vogue Australia until the 1980s before starting full-time painting in 1985 at the age of 52. Her career transformation was greatly influenced by a trip to Kimberley, Western Australia, where she felt enchanted by the local indigenous culture. Her unique style is created using wax and pigments and the minimal use of brushes.

== Early life and career ==
Jenny Sages was born in Shanghai, China, in 1933, and did not move to Sydney, Australia, until she was 14. Her parents were Russian, and she was their only child. During their time in Shanghai, her father sold silk for a living. The family decided to move to Sydney in 1948 due to the political turmoil in China. Sages started attending Sydney Girls High School at 14 and continued to study Design & Colour and Life Drawing at East Sydney Technical College from 1950–51, but she got expelled. She then went to New York and studied at the Franklin School of Art for three-and-a-half years from 1951 to 1954 and graduated in Fine Art, Design and Commercial Art. Sages recalled in an interview with Maria Stoljar in 2017 that she did not acquire any painting skills from art school in New York, but studied fashion illustration instead, which later helped launching her career in the fashion industry.

After her finishing her studies in New York, Sages traveled the Middle East. In 1954, She met her husband Jack Sages in Israel, who was serving the British Navy stationed in Alexandria, Egypt, during World War II. The two later married, returned to Australia and had a daughter Tanya.

After returning to Australia, Sages worked as a freelance fashion illustrator and travel blogger from 1955 to 1984 for various books and magazines, including Vogue. She also attended John Olsen and Mary White's School in Sydney from 1956–57.

== Artist career ==
Sages claims that despite only becoming a full-time artist at the age of 52, she has been drawing her entire life. In 1983, Sages went on a trip to Kimberley that became a turning point in her career, as she later decided to pursue full-time career as an artist.

For 20 years, she frequently visited Aboriginal communities in central Australia and Darwin with a group of female artists in search of inspirations of her landscape paintings and portraits. During her travels, she met the Aboriginal artist Emily Kame Kngwarreye, whom she developed a special relationship with as a fellow elderly female artist and became the subject of her portraits now collected by the National Portrait Gallery. She has been working on her art in her private studio located in Double Bay, Sydney since 1985, and regularly held exhibitions in Sydney and Canberra since 1988.

The National Portrait Gallery honoured Sages' unique ability to capture the relationship between the artists and the subject and process of portrait making in her paintings with the exhibition Jenny Sages: Paths to Portraiture in 2010 and 2011, displaying four large-scale portraits and other related materials, artworks, and sketches. The exhibition went on tour in five other locations (Tweed Heads, Toowoomba, Mackay, Burnie and Mosman) with a more expansive collection of Sages' work. Among the National Portrait Gallery's collection, the portraits of artist Emily Kame Kngwarreye, author Helen Garner, and the late ballerina Irina Baronova are permanently on display.

Sages has also taken up the role as a judge for the Adelaide Perry prize in 2013.

== Influence ==
Jenny Sages's portrait of Emily Kame Kngwarrey, Emily Kame Kngwarreye with Lily (1993), was the first work collected by the newly founded National Portrait Gallery in 1998. Art historian Dr. Sarah Engledow pointed out that Andrew Sayers, the first director of the National Portrait Gallery purchased this portrait as a purpose of not positioning the institution in a British Colonial text-book narrative.

Sages' portrait Jackie and Kerryn depicting politician Kerryn Phelps and her wife Jackie Stricker won the 2001 Archibald Prize. The portrait played a role in maintaining the high-profile lesbian couple's media and cultural visibility.

== Artworks ==
=== Material and artistic methods ===
Sages was one of the pioneering artists in Australia to apply the encaustic method to her paintings, as she was inspired by the Fayum portraits of Ancient Egypt. All of her paintings were created on the surface of MDF boards coated with wax. According to journalist Elizabeth Wilson's observations in 2011, Sages spends a great amount of time on preparatory work, from making markings on the boards to rubbing the incisions with oil and pigment, taking her weeks to finish a single piece. Sages expressed to Wilson that she is fond of the way these materials bring depth and character to her portrait subjects' faces. Sages creates her work using kitchen knives scraping into the surface of the boards, forming indentations for pigments to settle. She then builds up colour and texture with her fingers and palms using pigments.

=== Theme and style ===
Sages is known in the Australian art scene mainly for her abstract landscape paintings and her deeply connecting portraits.

==== Portrait ====
After Jack, 2012

Sages said in an interview that she never takes commission to do portraits because she only does it for her loved ones, motivated by her own interest. Her portrait paintings, including self-portraits, won her 21 Archibald prizes in total.

Sages also composed several self-portraits, including Each morning when I wake up I put on my mother's face (2000) and After Jack (2012). After Jack received the People's Choice Awards of the 2012 Archibald Prize, for it was voted as the favourite work among the finalists. The work earned Sages her highest achievement in the Archibald prize. The self-portrait is regarded as manifesting "profound human connection" as it is deeply personal for Sages. Sages expressed that the process of painting was driven by grief. After 55 years of marriage to Jack Sages, Jenny Sages explores her new identity and new life without him in this self-portrait. The work was completed using the same encaustic painting technique as her other portraits.

==== Abstract landscape ====
Despite Sages sourcing her inspiration through observing indigenous art-making, her representation of the central Australian landscape does not include Aboriginal icons, techniques, and forms, but stimulated by her own senses and memories of the land. Curator Margot Osborne observed that Sages "approach to abstraction is not imitative of Aboriginal art, but there are affinities evident in her repetitive organic rhythms and textures and also in the underlying allusions to nature as a wellspring of spiritual understanding."

Sages landscape paintings feature the tactile and rhythmic patterns that resembles elements from nature, such as leaf skeletons, maggots, seeds, or weathered wood and fossilized tracks.

==== Text incorporation ====
The use of texts can be seen in a small portion of Sages work as they signify her heritage and personal identity as an artist. In her self-portrait Each morning when I wake up I put on my mother's face (2000), lines written by the Russian poet Anna Akhmatova takes up most of the space, as they echo with her Russian heritage. The painting I am not as stupid as you think I am created in 2009 with the topic written repetitively in the work reflects the educational values of punishment in Sages' generation, as it declares a self-asserting sentiment as a student, an artist, or a woman. The work Ecclesiastes, or The Preacher (2011), densely filled with words from the Bible, demonstrates her patience and techniques as an artist.

== Relationship with portrait subjects ==
Sarah Engledow, an art historian at the National Portrait Gallery, commented on Sages portraits: "The sincerity of the engagement between Jenny and her subjects – and this is the case for all of Jenny's portraits – is the strength of her painting." Her subjects are mainly family, friends, and also fellow artist, authors, dancers, whom she admires as they become friends during the course of creating the portraits.

=== Jack Sages ===
One of Sages best-known works, My Jack (2010) is a portrait of her late husband Jack Sages that won the 2011 Archibald finalist.

Sages started painting her husband in June, 2010, and finished in July (AGNSW). Jack Sages died at the age of 85, on 1 October 2010. "This painting was done faster than most portraits because I knew him so well and he was sitting on the veranda and I could sneak out and look at him," she explained in an interview.

Jack Sages played a profound role in her artist career and her personal life. Sages said in interviews that her husband's frequent participation in her preparatory work and provided care and moral support while she pursued her artist career. "Jack prepared all the MDF boards [for my works]," says Jenny to Wilson in her 2011 interview. "I could paint all I wanted to and he'd look after me." The MDF board My Jack was painted on is the last one her late husband prepared for her, as she dedicates it back to him. Despite drawing him for many times, My Jack was the only painted portrait of Jack Sages.

=== Emily Kame Kngwarreye ===
Sages' friendship with the Aboriginal artist started when she visited her in the Northern Territory, where Emily Kame Kngwarreye's community is. Sages was in her 50s and Knwarreye in her 80s. They formed casual conversations about children and their senior age, as Sages recorded their conversations and Knwarreye's gestures and expressions in her drawings. Sages completed a portrait of Emily, Emily Kame Kngwarreye with Lily in 1993, later becoming the first piece collected by the National Portrait Gallery in 1998.

Alongside Sages large scale portrait painting of Knwarreye, the National Gallery Museum collected a series of sketches recording the casual conversations between the two artists. The sketches reflected the relationship between Sages and Kngwarreye, annotated with sentences Kngwarreye spoke at the time, such as "I like your hat" or "My back hurts, does yours?"

=== Helen Garner ===
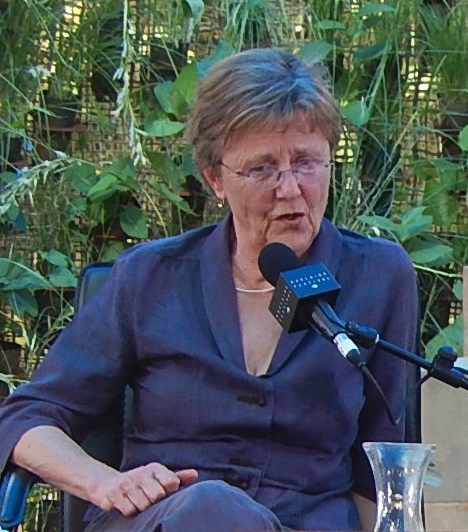
Photograph of author Helen Garner

Sages started to seek opportunity to paint Helen Garner since 1996, after reading Garner's book True Stories. Garner has declined other opportunities to be painted in the past, as she said, "It's bad enough having your photo taken, ..., but my portrait – that's too much to bear. You have to sit in the room with the person for a long time and it needs to be somebody that you can get on with and maybe even like!" In 2002, the two first met upon Sages' request in Melbourne, where the writer reside; Garner later visited Sages house in Sydney, where Sages drew her. Garner described their time as "very pleasurable," and Sages returns the feeling, saying they had "a wonderful encounter."

During their visits, Sages completed 37 drawings of the writer, which were the source of elements for the portrait she later completed. Art historian Sarah Engledow commented on the drawings now under the National Portrait Gallery's collection, "though they are 'preparatory' works these paintings are good examples of Sages' skill at capturing the light of varying times of day."

Sages produced the portrait of Helen Garner, True Stories – Helen Garner in 2003, and won the Archibald Prize finalist the same year. The painting was completed with her usual medium, wax-based surface and rubbed-in pigments. Garner said "I immediately felt that it was me," as she first saw her portrait at the Art Gallery of New South Wales. She also appreciates Sages portraying her in less flattering but more realistic aesthetic. "When I looked at the painting I just felt that she had seen me in some quite deep way'." Sages was approached by Portrait Gallery Director Andrew Sayers, who was interested in including the work in his gallery collection; Sage then offered the portrait as a donation to the gallery.

=== Kate Grenville ===
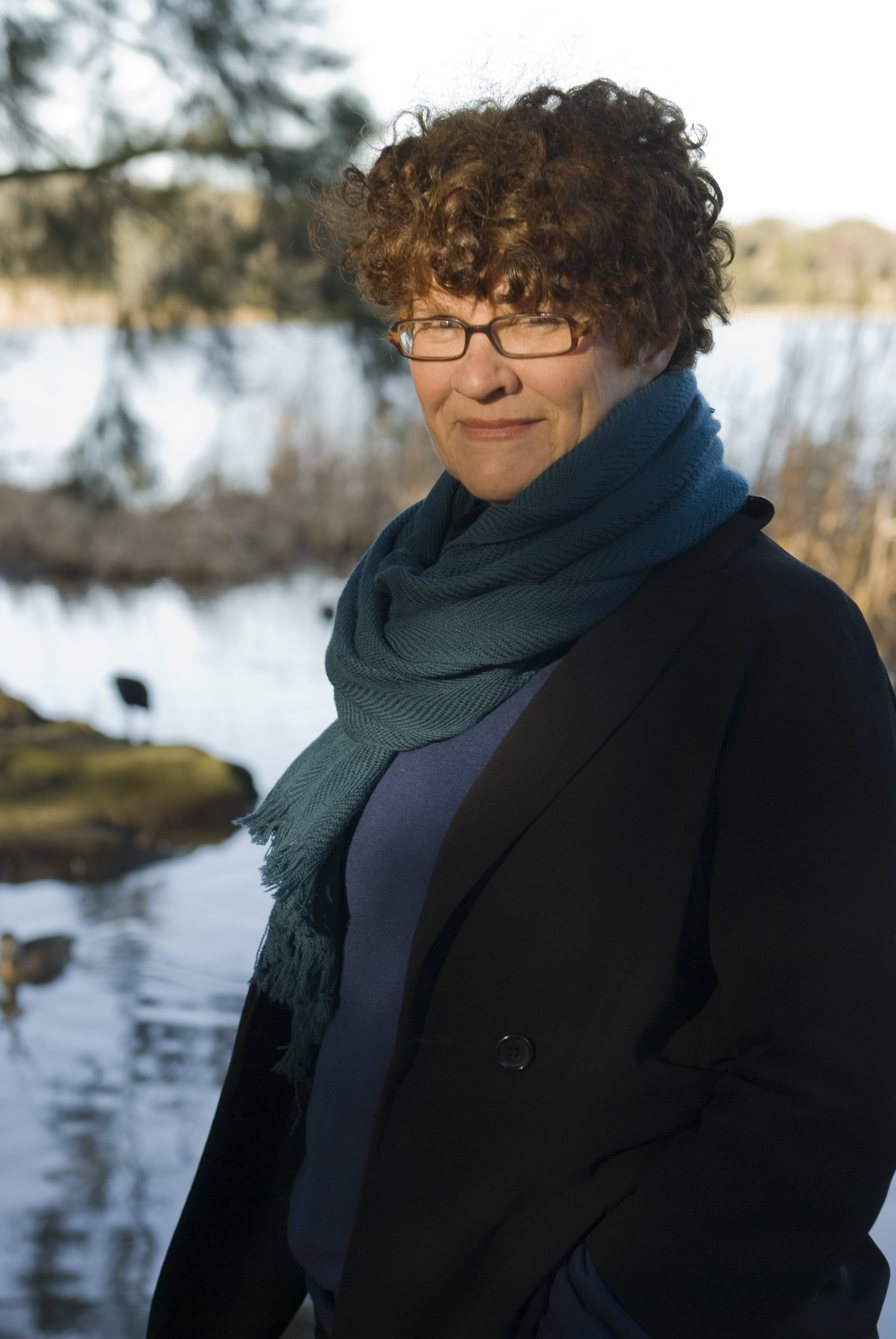
Photograph of author Kate Grenville, 2011

Sages painted Kate Grenville's portrait Kate in 2012 and the piece is currently under the National Portrait Gallery's collection. The painting is set in front of Hawkesbury River, where the story in Grenville's novel The Secret River took place. Grenville described in an interview with the National Portrait Gallery that her connection with Sages was built on their resonating creative process, as both of them let their materials guide them on the journey of creation. She recounted the quest in creating this portrait, "we went up to the Hawkesbury together, which is of course where the portrait is set, and when we found that spot by the river, and the little jetty, we both knew straight away that that was it".

== Archibald Prize ==
She has been a finalist for the Archibald Prize at least 20 times.

Year	Name of work		Comments
1990	Adele Weiss and Benjamin	Finalist	
1993	Keith Bain (Everyone is Doing the Farandole)	Finalist	
1994	Loti and Victor Smorgon	Finalist	
1995	Gene Sherman with Family, After Tillers, After Freud, After Watteau	Finalist	
1996	Paul Cox	Finalist	
1997	Greg Weight making a portrait of Tom Bass	Finalist	
1998	Nobody's daughter – Meme Thorne	Finalist	
1999	Meryl Tankard	Finalist	
2000	Each morning when I wake up I put on my mother's face	Finalist	
2001	My Love		Highly Commended
2001	Jackie and Kerryn	Finalist	
2002	Ros and Joe	Finalist	
2003	True Stories – Helen Garner	Finalist	
2004	Seeing the lights – Anthony Hopkins artist	Finalist	
2005	Gloria Tamere Petyarre	Finalist	
?			People's Choice award
2006	Hossein Valamanesh	Finalist	
2007	Irina Baronova (handing on the baton)	Finalist	
2008	Anita and Luca	Finalist	
2009	Heidi & Sarah-Jane 'parallel lives'	Finalist	
2011	My Jack	Finalist	
2012	After Jack (Self Portrait)	Finalist	People's Choice award

She has also been the hung in the Archibald as the subject of the work of Jiawei Shen's 2002 Finalist's work The lady from Shanghai (Jenny Sages)

== Awards ==
She has also been hung in the Blake Prize and Dobell Prize. She has won the Portia Geach Memorial Award twice: in 1994 for her portrait Ann Thomson, and in 1992 for her portrait Nancy Borlase and Laurie Short. She received a highly commended in the Wynne Prize in 1999 with The Leichhardt. She won the Wynne Prize in 2005.

Sages was one of five artists featured in the award winning documentary film, Two Thirds Sky – Artists in Desert Country, directed by Sean O'Brien in 2002.

She was interviewed in the 2005 Peter Berner documentary Loaded Brush.

Sages is the subject of the documentary Paths to Portraiture by filmmaker Catherine Hunter. For the 2011 Archibald Prize, Jenny painted Jack Sages her husband and companion of 55 years. The painting was accepted but Jack died before the exhibition opened. In 2012 Sages turned her gaze inward in an attempt to capture her grief. Hunter was with the artist as she dealt with her husband's death and then the 2012 Archibald Prize success.
