= Jo Caddy =

American-Australian painter and ceramicist

Josephine Caddy
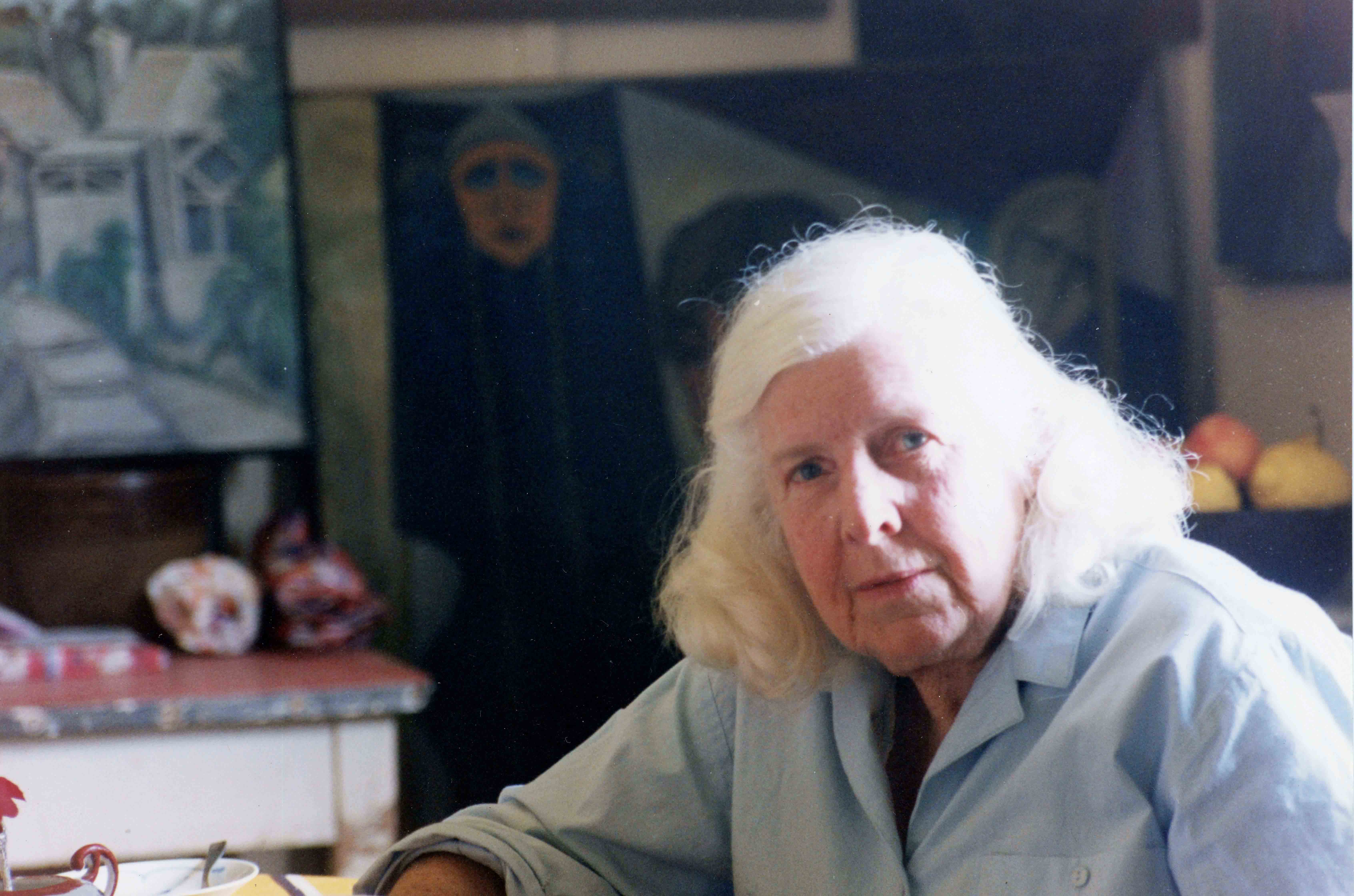
- Caddy at her home in the Adelaide Hills circa 1990
- Born: 1914; USA
- Died: 2005; Adelaide, South Australia
- Education: Vancouver School of Art
- Known for: Portraiture-based ceramics and paintings

Josephine Caddy (1914 – 2005) was an American-Australian painter and ceramicist, who worked in the media of acrylic, oil, printmaking, drawing, and ceramics. She focused on portraiture in both her paintings and ceramics, including "people pots", vases featuring human faces.

== Biography ==
Caddy was born in Washington, USA and spent part of her childhood in Juneau, Alaska. She completed a degree in Fine Arts at the Vancouver School of Art.

She arrived in Tasmania in 1951 and moved to Adelaide in 1957, where she frequently held exhibitions of her work and taught at the South Australian School of Art (now the University of South Australia), University of Adelaide and Girton Girls' School. Caddy travelled widely and she would sketch prolifically, using this material to generate paintings and ceramics for an exhibition upon her return to her studio. Caddy was divorced and had three children.

== Notable works ==
Jo Caddy's paintings are held by the Art Gallery of South Australia and in several private collections. Seven of her portraits were finalists in the Archibald Prize and she won the Portia Geach Memorial Award in 1967.

Caddy produced portraits of several notable Australian and international figures including:

- Joy Adamson (naturalist)
- Justice John Jefferson Bray (Chief Justice of the Supreme Court of South Australia)
- Jo Caddy (self portraits) (Finalist 1967 Archibald Prize; Finalist 1968 Archibald Prize)
- Christopher Coventry (artist) (Finalist 1973 Archibald Prize)
- Lawrence Daws (artist) (Winner 1967 Portia Geach Memorial Award; Finalist 1967 Archibald Prize)
- Peter Duncan (Australian Politician)
- Kate Fitzpatrick (Australian Actress)
- Father Owen Farrell (Finalist 1969 Archibald Prize)
- John Gaden (actor) (Finalist 1968 Archibald Prize)
- Sir Robert Helpmann (ballet dancer, actor and choreographer)
- Brian Medlin (Professor of Philosophy, Flinders University) (Finalist 1969 Archibald Prize)
- Milton Moon (Australian artist)
- Seymour Segal (Canadian artist)
- Mervyn Smith (Australian artist)
- Hamilton D'Arcy Sutherland (heart surgeon)
- Andrena "Andy" Thorpe (model and radio personality)
