= Rhys Lee =

Australian visual artist

Rhys Lee is an Australian visual artist who lives in Aireys Inlet, Victoria. Coming from a background of street art, Rhys works in a range of media centring on painting with acrylics and oils. Rhys is represented by in a range of art collections that include the University of Queensland Art Museum.

He was a finalist in the Archibald Prize in 2012.
