= Graeme Townsend =

Australian artist

- Born: Graeme Dennis Townsend; 14 March 1954 (age 72); Sydney, New South Wales, Australia
- Education: Wyvern House; Newington College; Julian Ashton Art School; Alexander Mackie College
- Known for: Painting
- Website: Graeme Townsend

Graeme Townsend (born 14 March 1954) is an Australian artist who uses wildlife as an inspiration. His recent work explores man's impact on the environment and how nature has responded to that change. In October 1982 a photographic image of Townsend with one of his painted giraffes graced the front cover of The Bulletin. In the photo he is captured wearing a beard, sneakers and army disposal gear and the young artist is introduced to the broader Australian cultural market. His 1990 photographic portrait by Jim Roland is held by the National Library of Australia.

== Early life ==
Townsend grew up in Five Dock and attended local schools until he commenced as a preparatory school student at Wyvern House in Stanmore. He left Newington College after completing his School Certificate in 1970. In 1973 and 1974 he studied art at the Julian Ashton Art School before being awarded a Dip Art. B.A. in 1979 from the Alexander Mackie College, Paddington.

== Art career ==
In 1979 Townsend's first major one man exhibition was held by Barry Stern at his eponymous gallery in Glenmore Road, Paddington. Since then he has undertaken painting and photographic expeditions to Borneo, Africa, Asia, America and throughout outback Australia. In the 1990s he was a lecturer in acrylic painting at his alma mater, the Julian Ashton Art School. He has had many solo exhibitions in Sydney, Melbourne and Perth as well as the United States of America, Japan and Hong Kong. Townsend's work has been hung in the Sulman and Wynne Prize exhibitions at the Art Gallery of New South Wales. His work draws on fantasy and surrealism and takes inspiration from the works of Belgian surrealist Rene Magritte and German romantic and allegorical landscape painter Caspar David Friedrich.
