= John Tickell =

Personal information
- Full name: John Tickell
- Born: 29 January 1945 (age 81)
- Original team: University Blues
- Height: 185 cm (6 ft 1 in)
- Weight: 80 kg (176 lb)

Playing career^{1}
Years	Club	Games (Goals)
1965–1966	Hawthorn	18 (2)
- ^{1} Playing statistics correct to the end of 1966.

Dr. John Tickell (born 29 January 1945) is an Australian doctor, businessman, author, former athlete and speaker.

In his younger days, Tickell played Australian rules football, first with the University Blues team and later with the Hawthorn Football Club in the Victorian Football League (now known as the AFL). In a brief career spanning 1965–66, he played 18 games with the Hawks for 2 goals. During this time he graduated from the University of Melbourne with a degree in medicine.

Tickell later became a general practitioner, obstetrician and a specialist practitioner in sports medicine. He has written several books, the most notable being The Great Australian Diet and Laughter, Sex, Vegetables & Fish. He has also appeared on television shows such as Celebrity Overhaul providing advice on healthier lifestyle.

Among his business achievements including the collaboration with Jack Nicklaus in creating the Heritage Golf and Residential Country Club in Victoria. He has also appeared as a public speaker on issues such as how to turn stress into success and how to live a longer, healthier life.
