= Wizards and Warriors (TV series) =

- Also known as: Greystone's Odyssey
- Genre: Adventure
- Created by: Don Reo
- Written by: Don Reo
- Directed by: Bill Bixby; Richard A. Colla
- Starring: Ian Wolfe; Jeff Conaway; Clive Revill; Duncan Regehr; Julia Duffy; Thomas Hill; Walter Olkewicz
- Composers: Lee Holdridge; Alf Clausen
- Country of origin: United States
- Original language: English
- No. of seasons: 1
- No. of episodes: 8

Production
- Executive producer: Don Reo
- Running time: 60 minutes
- Production companies: Don Reo Productions; Warner Bros. Television

Original release
- Network: CBS
- Release: February 26 – May 14, 1983

Wizards and Warriors is an American comedy adventure fantasy series that aired on CBS from February 26 to May 14, 1983. Starring Jeff Conaway, Julia Duffy, Walter Olkewicz, Duncan Regehr, and Clive Revill, eight one-hour episodes were made. The series was created by Don Reo for Warner Bros. Television and three of the episodes were directed by Bill Bixby.

== Summary ==
In the medieval realm of Aperans, the neighboring kingdoms of Karteia and Camarand engage in repeated conflict. Prince Erik Greystone, who is engaged to Princess Ariel Baaldorf, battles the evil Prince Dirk Blackpool. Both princes employ magic users of various alignments to gain the upper hand against each other.

== Cast ==
Characters are described, according to the newspaper, Wilmington Morning Star.

=== Starring ===
- Jeff Conaway as Prince Erik Greystone.
- Walter Olkewicz as Marko, Prince Erik's valet.
- Duncan Regehr as Dirk Blackpool, the handsome-but-sinister Crown Prince of Karteia.
- Julia Duffy as Ariel Baaldorf, the lovely-but-spoiled Crown Princess of Camarand. Her tastes run to "furs, jewels, and leather pants". She has a pet unicorn named Pumpkin.
- Clive Revill as Vector, an evil Karteian sorcerer.

=== Recurring ===
- Thomas Hill – Edwin Baaldorf, King of Camarand. Ariel's father.
- Ian Wolfe – Traquill, an aging Camarandian wizard.
- Tim Dunigan – Geoffrey Blackpool, Prince of Karteia. Dirk's younger brother and frequent aide-de-camp. Less crafty than Dirk, but also nowhere near as vicious.
- Jay Kerr – Prince Justin Greystone, Erik's playboy brother.
- Julie Payne – Lattinia Baaldorf, Queen of Camarand and Ariel's mother.
- Randi Brooks – Bethel, a Karteian witch who frequently serves House Blackpool.
- Phyllis Katz – Cassandra, a handmaiden in the service of House Baaldorf.
- Lonnie Wun – Oriental Guard

== Episodes ==
No.	Title	Directed by	Written by	Original release date
1	"The Unicorn of Death"	Bill Bixby	Bill Richmond	February 26, 1983
2	"The Kidnap"	Richard A. Colla	Don Reo	March 5, 1983
3	"The Rescue"	James Frawley	Don Reo	March 12, 1983
4	"Night of Terror"	Bill Bixby	Bill Richmond	March 19, 1983
5	"Skies of Death"	Bill Bixby	Don Reo	April 9, 1983
6	"The Caverns of Chaos"	Paul Krasny	Don Reo	April 30, 1983
7	"The Dungeon of Death"	Kevin Connor	Judith D. Allison	May 7, 1983
8	"Vulkar's Revenge"	Kevin Connor	Robert Earll	May 14, 1983

== Broadcast and reception ==
The series debuted as a midseason replacement for the cancelled series Bring 'Em Back Alive. It aired on Saturdays at 8:00pm Eastern / 7:00pm Central. Syndicated columnist Judy Flander praised the series as "witty", including the directing, the writing, and the acting. Due to low ratings, the series was not renewed for the second season and was cancelled. The costume designer Theadora Van Runkle won the Primetime Emmy Award for Outstanding Costumes for a Series. The series' hairstylist Sharleen Rassi lost a Primetime Emmy Awards for Outstanding Achievement in Hairstyling to Edie Panda for the made-for television film Rosie: The Rosemary Clooney Story.

== DVD release ==
On July 29, 2014, Warner Bros. released the complete series on DVD in Region 1 for the very first time via their Warner Archive Collection. This is a manufacture-on-demand (MOD) release, available through Warner's online store and Amazon.com.
