= Kit Hiller =

Australian artist (born 1948)

Kit (Christine) Hiller is a Tasmanian artist, now working principally in the mediums of linocut print and oil painting. She is a three-time winner of the Portia Geach Memorial Award, a portraiture prize for Australian women artists, and has been a finalist in the Archibald Prize for Portraiture five times. Hiller is widely known for her vividly coloured linocut prints of nature subjects, particularly flora and birds. She also paints large-scale portraits and landscapes of North-West Tasmania, where she lives.

== Biography ==
Hiller was born in Hobart, Tasmania, in 1948 and trained at the Tasmanian School of Art from 1966-69. She was an art teacher from 1970–72 and has been an exhibiting artist since 1979. She lives at Lower Mt Hicks, on Tasmania’s North West Coast.

== Works ==
Hiller both hand-colours single-block lino-cut prints and uses the elimination lino-cut method to create her signature vividly coloured print works. Originally a watercolour painter, she now favours large-scale works in oil, frequently with herself as the subject. She won the Portia Geach award in 2009 with the self-portrait, The Old Painter, in which she depicted herself as the Virgin of Guadalupe, inspired by a visit to Mexico.

== Awards ==
Winner of the Portia Geach Memorial Prize 1986, 1987 and 2009. Hiller is represented by Australian Galleries in Melbourne and Sydney and Handmark Gallery in Tasmania. She was named Tasmanian of the Year in 1987.

== Collections ==
Her work is held by the Queen Victoria Museum and Art Gallery, Tasmania and the Tasmanian Museum and Art Gallery, Artbank as well as several university and regional collections.
