= Matt and Jenny =

Canadian television series (1979–1980)

- Genre: Drama
- Created by: William Davidson
- Written by: William Davidson; Martin Lager; John Craig; George Salverson
- Directed by: Joseph L. Scanlan; René Bonnière; Francis Chapman
- Starring: Neil Dainard; Duncan Regehr; Derrick Jones; Megan Follows
- Theme music composer: Ron Harrison
- Country of origin: Canada
- Original language: English
- No. of seasons: 1
- No. of episodes: 26 (list of episodes)

Production
- Executive producers: Ralph C. Ellis; David Gideon Thompson for Polytel Film Ltd.
- Producer: William Davidson
- Camera setup: Single-camera
- Running time: 25 minutes
- Production companies: Manitou Productions Ltd.; Polytel Film Ltd.; Shelter Films Ltd.

Original release
- Network: Global Television Network
- Release: October 21, 1979 – 1980

Matt and Jenny (or Matt and Jenny on the Wilderness Trail) is a Canadian television series of 26 episodes of 25 minutes each, broadcast on Global starting October 21, 1979.

A French-language dub of the show, titled Les routes de l'amitié, later aired on La Chaîne française, Ontario's then-new francophone educational service, in 1986. American television producer Norman Lear also purchased American rights to the show in 1980; however, he did not indicate at the time whether he planned to syndicate the existing Canadian show or produce an Americanized remake, and neither plan subsequently materialized. However, the series later aired in the United States on Nickelodeon circa 1981-1983.

The series won an award for Best Television Series from the Canadian Film and Television Association in 1979.

== Synopsis ==
Two English children, Matt and Jenny Tanner, and their mother depart for the New World from Bristol, England. During the voyage, their mother dies of typhoid fever. The two children arrive in Canada and begin a search for their uncle Bill Tanner, who arrived before they had.

== Cast ==
- Derrick Jones – Matt
- Megan Follows – Jenny
- Neil Dainard – Adam Cardston
- Duncan Regehr – Kit

== Filming locations ==
- Mainly shot at the Toronto International Studios lot at Kleinburg, Ontario.

== Episode list ==
1. Search for a New Home
2. Thunder and Lightning Birds
3. The Bellinis
4. The Long Return
5. The Whirlwind Voice
6. Test for the Tanners
7. A Call to Arms
8. Devil's Gorge
9. The Mast
10. Fiddle Joe and the Devil Himself
11. The Teacher
12. Barnabas Bletcher
13. Wolf Howl at Kennebec Cliff
14. Ceremony at Whispering Pines
15. Wilderness Photographer
16. Sport of Kings
17. Skiba the Bear
18. Harry Alfred Teasdale Rides Again [1/2]
19. Harry Alfred Teasdale Rides Again [2/2]
20. Frontier Justice
21. A Woman's Place
22. The Actress
23. Mystery of the Pikes
24. The Highlanders
25. Wagon Train West
26. Ghost of Pocomoonshine Swamp
