= Blood Surf =

2000 American film

- UK DVD cover
- Directed by: James D. R. Hickox
- Written by: Sam Bernard; Robert L. Levy
- Produced by: Robert L. Levy; Natan Zahavi; Peter Abrams
- Starring: Dax Miller; Kate Fischer; Duncan Regehr
- Cinematography: Christopher C. Pearson
- Edited by: Matthew Booth
- Music by: Jim Manzie
- Distributed by: Trimark Pictures; Flashstar Home Video; Sunfilm Entertainment
- Release dates: December 4, 2000 (UK); June 26, 2001 (U.S.)
- Running time: 88 minutes
- Country: United States
- Language: English

Blood Surf (also known by its original title, Krocodylus) is a 2000 natural horror film directed by James D. R. Hickox. It was released in the United States on June 26, 2001, but was released earlier in some countries. The plot is about a group of friends who hit upon the idea of blood surfing: spreading chum in the water in order to attract sharks, then hopping on a surfboard and riding through the middle of the pack. As they are filming their promotional documentary, the fun gets interrupted by a 30 ft (9.1 m) long saltwater crocodile that begins attacking everyone in the expedition. It was the last Trimark Pictures produced film to be released, as Trimark was folded into Lions Gate Entertainment a few months prior.

== Plot ==
The film opens with John's vision of screaming people in the water and being killed by something under the water. A plane full of people getting psyched up to try blood surfing at some remote island known for its sea surfing locale lands on water. A documentary is planned on the blood surfing exploits of Bog (Dax Miller) and Jeremy (Joel West) who is known for extreme sports, with camera operator Cecily (Kate Fischer) and her boyfriend/producer Zack (Matthew Borlenghi). As the film progresses, Cecily's interest in Bog develops.

After arriving, the group decide to head to shark rich waters by a remote island, so they contact local guide John Dirks (Duncan Regehr) and his girlfriend Artemis/Arty (Taryn Reif). John at first refuses to go, but then relents and accepts the job on the condition that his sail team would come along, including the young Lemmya (Maureen Larrazabal) who is attracted to Jeremy. The group heads out to the shark zone, despite John being plagued by visions of screaming swimmers being devoured by something in the water. Clumps of meat are thrown in to attract the sharks while Bog and Jeremy suit up, slit their feet, and begin surfing among a group of sharks. While taking a break from the shoot, at the beach they see a shark get eaten by something gigantic and fill the ocean water. The group wisely call it a day.

On another part of the island nearby, Jeremy and Lemmya have sex as her parents Melba (Susan Africa) and Sonny (Cris Vertido), are devoured by an unseen beast and the boat is wrecked. Lemmya heads to the water to bathe without realizing the danger and is devoured. The remaining crew go back for the boat but find it wrecked. Bog goes underwater for the camera. They are chased by the beast that comes out from under the water. As they escape to the beach on the other side of the island they are taken captive by local pirates.

As one of them is trying to have his way with Cecily, the beast - revealed to be a 31 ft (9.4 m) long, 3,000 lb (1.4 t) saltwater crocodile - jumps out of the water and eats him. In the ensuing chaos Bog with Zack and Jeremy throw the bandits into the sea. The pirate leader shoots and hits the boat's fuel tank, forcing Bog and company to abandon ship. They are picked up by John and Arty. In revenge for the deaths that happened sometime in his past, John goes back for the beast. Zack wants to film the killing, but John denies him. In the chaos when the beast is harpooned, Jeremy gets eaten. John beaches the ship on a coral reef while trying to outrun the beast. Zack tries to surf from the reef to shore, but the beast eats him along the way.

John wires the boat to explode. The beast attacks before he can finish, tearing him in half. The surviving pirate leader knocks out Arty and then tries to rape Cecily. Cecily starts talking dirty saying things like "I want it" to trick him. Cecily deliberately steps on the line that triggers a spear trap that John left behind killing the pirate. Then she goes to wake Arty. The girls walk further inland and find a temple on the island, with no sign of any predators. The beast comes to attack them but they jump into the nearby river and since they are in freshwater, the beast would not go near them.

Bog recovers the explosives from the wrecked boat, and is reunited with Cecily and Arty. He baits the beast to an unstable wall and uses the explosives to bring the wall crashing down on the creature. Believing the beast is dead, Arty starts kicking it and - in a swift move - it opens its mouth and devours her. Bog and Cecily start running with the beast in close pursuit until it leaps and gets impaled through its stomach by a sharp protruding rock. The beast dies, ending its reign of terror. Bog and Cecily rest on the other side of the river bank and start kissing as they celebrate. The camera slowly pans over to reveal the flowing water along the river.

== Cast ==
- Dax Miller as Bog Hall
- Kate Fischer as Cecily Herrold (credited as Katie Fischer)
- Duncan Regehr as John Dirks
- Matthew Borlenghi as Zack Jardine (credited as Matt Borlenghi)
- Joel West as Jeremy
- Taryn Reif as Arty
- Maureen Larrazabal as Lemmya Lofranco
- Cris Vertido as Sonny Lofranco
- Susan Africa as Melba Lofranco
- Archie Adamos as Joker
- Rolly Sto. Domingo as Rolly
- Malecio Amayao as Boat Man

Pirates

- Allen Chen
- Rudy Castillo
- Óscar Navarro
- Reynaldo T. Casuco
- David Weisman (uncredited)

Teenagers

- Kristine Chieng
- Inka Wollenberg
- Andre Wollenberg
- Scott McCormick

== See also ==
- List of monster movies
- List of killer crocodile films
