= Paul Newton (artist) =

Australian painter

- Born: 1961 (age 64–65); Sydney, New South Wales, Australia
- Known for: Painting
- Awards: Archibald Prize: Packing Room and People's Choice

Paul Newton (born 1961) is an Australian artist. He has won the Archibald Prize Packing Room Prize twice: in 1996 with a portrait of radio announcer John Laws CBE; and, again in 2001 (along with the People's Choice award) with a portrait of characters Roy Slaven and HG Nelson.

He has works in the permanent collection of the National Portrait Gallery in Canberra, and is a portrait artist for Parliament House, Canberra. He has painted Prime Ministers and Governor General Sir William Deane AC, KBE. Other portraits by Newton have been Archibald Prize finalists including paintings of model Kate Fischer in 1997, model Maggie Tabberer AM in 1999, and rugby player David Campese AM in 2000 (which was acquired by the National Portrait Gallery). He has also won portrait competitions in Philadelphia and the Portrait Society of America's 2003 International Portrait Competition in Washington, D.C..

In 1999, his portrait of Bryce Courtenay AM was hung in the Archibald Salon des Refusés. His portrait of John Doyle was also hung in the Salon des Refusés in 1995.

In 2002, he painted arts figure Brett Sheehy AO for that year's Archibald Prize with the painting later being a finalist in the 2004 Doug Moran National Portrait Prize.

In 2003, an image painted on Ian Thorpe's jeans by Paul Newton was used as a pin for the Jeans for Genes Day. The jeans were later auctioned by the charity for $26,000.

Newton holds a Bachelor of Science from the University of Sydney and a Diploma of Art from the Julian Ashton Art School in Sydney.

He painted a portrait of Tara Moss which was a finalist in the Doug Moran National Portrait Prize, and was 'highly commended' at the Shirley Hannan National Portrait Awards in Bega.

Newton was commissioned to paint a depiction of the Madonna and Child Our Lady of the Southern Cross for World Youth Day 2008, which now hangs permanently in St Mary's Cathedral, Sydney.

He has been a finalist in the Archibald Prize 15 times, including in 1997, 1999, 2000, 2002, 2004, 2006, 2008, 2010 (with Self portrait #2 – dark night of the soul), 2012, 2014, 2017, 2020 and 2022.

Awards
Preceded by Danelle Bergstrom	Packing Room Prize; 1996 for John Laws	Succeeded by Bill Leak
Awards
Preceded by Bill Leak	Packing Room Prize; 2001 for Roy Slaven and HG Nelson	Succeeded by Jan Williamson
Awards
Preceded by Esther Erlich	People's Choice Award; 2001 portrait of John Doyle and Greig Pickhaver (Roy Slaven and HG Nelson)	Succeeded by Jan Williamson
