= Hongbin Zhao =

Chinese painter (born 1952)

Zhao Hongbin (simplified Chinese: 赵红斌; traditional Chinese: 趙紅斌; born 1952 in Shanghai) is a Chinese–Australian artist. He studied Fine Art Research in Shanghai Jiao Tong University and worked as art editor and chief editor in magazines. He went to Australia in 1988 and became a professional artist. Zhao Hongbin was granted as an "International talented artist" to receive a special permit of permanent residence and joins the Australian citizenship in 1993. From 1989 to 1995, he won over 40 First Prizes in Australia Nationally art Competitions, including "Victor Harbor art show" oil painting first prize; "24th Ernest Henry memorial art show" landscape and portrait champion. etc. In 1992, the portrait "Dr.Geza" was chosen as the top four finalists for "Doug Moran National Portrait Prize" by international judge. In 1993, he won "the Omega Contemporary Art award" in London from "the Royal Overseas League International art Exhibition". In 1994, Portrait "Graeme" was a finalist for the Prestigious "Archibald Prize"; In 1995, he won the bronze medal in China's Famous Figure Works Exhibition.

His paintings have been exhibited at the Shanghai Art Museum, National Art Museum of China, Victoria Arts Center, National Gallery of Victoria, Art Gallery of New South Wales, Sydney Opera House, Australia Parliamentary Building, South Australian Art Gallery, Australian National Maritime Museum, China South-Korean International Art Exhibition, Taiwan 1st International Art Exhibition. In 1996, he was the appointed judge for Australian art Competition. Participated numerous art fairs include Taipei's International Art Expo. (1995, 1996) and Shanghai Art fair (1997, 1999).

Publication include: "The paintings of Zhao Hongbin" and biography selects into: "50 Australian Artists", "Who's Who in Australia", "Who's Who in the World", "500 Leaders of Influence", "Chinese Art Famous expert", "a famous teacher in modern times". In 2006, he was awarded "Honorary Doctorate of Arts’’ by the Yorker International University, USA.
