= Esther Erlich =

Australian artist

Esther Erlich (born 1955) is a Melbourne-based Australian artist who has been exhibiting since 1985. She won the 1998 Doug Moran National Portrait Prize with her painting, "Gaunt and Glorious" a portrait of Steve Moneghetti. In 2000 Esther won the Archibald People's Choice Award with her painting of Bill Leak.

Her works can be found in the collections of the National Library of Australia, the National Portrait Gallery, ALP Building Canberra, Council for Adult Education Victoria, Royal Overseas League Australian Collection, Performing Arts Museum Victoria.

Awards
Preceded by Evert Ploeg	People's Choice Award; 2000; Never been better-portrait of painter Bill Leak	Succeeded by Paul Newton
