= Deborah Hutton (Australian editor) =

Australian media personality (born 1961)

Deborah Hutton OAM
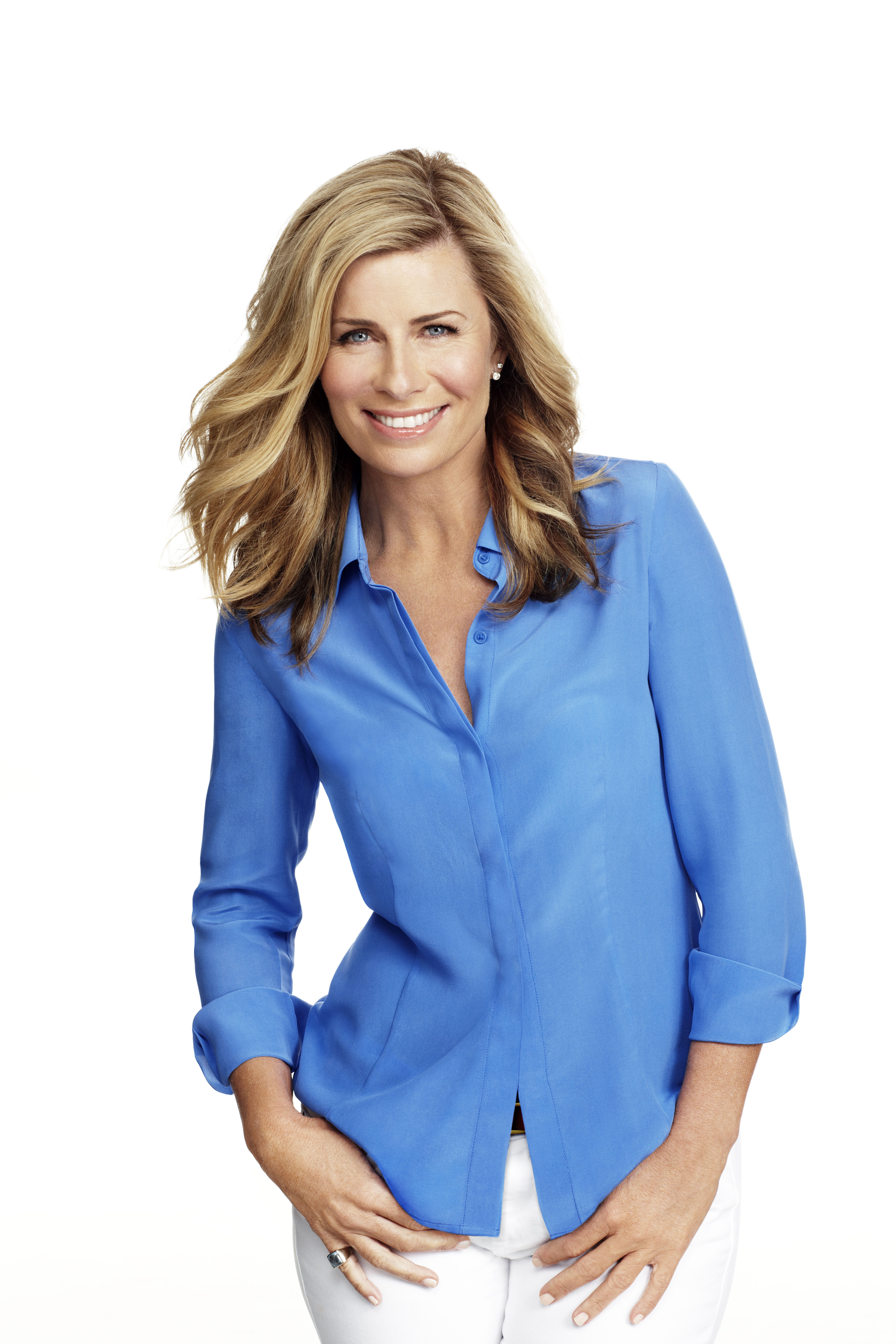
- Born: 20 December 1961 (age 64); London, England
- Occupations: Television presenter; magazine editor; model; ambassador

Deborah Hutton (born 20 December 1961) is an Australian media personality. She is a television presenter, magazine editor, ambassador and spokesmodel. She is a supporter of several charities including the Skin Cancer Foundation.

== Childhood ==
Born in England, she immigrated to Australia when she was very young. She and her mother travelled extensively from Queensland to Papua New Guinea before finally settling in Sydney.

== Career ==
Hutton left school and home at the age of 16 for a modelling career. She was on the cover of Cosmopolitan in October 1978 and then worked for Vivien's Modelling Agency (Sydney). At 18, she was contracted with Ford Modelling Agency in New York City.

=== Television host ===
In 1989, Hutton was co-host of the Ten Network quiz show, Superquiz with Mike Walsh. The weekly series, a remake of the former long-running quiz show Pick a Box, debuted in July but only lasted until the end of the year.

In June 1994 the Nine Network approached Hutton to present the new series of Looking Good. The series was a success with two million people tuning in, and often won its time slot in the national ratings. Hutton returned to host Looking Good again in 1995. During 1996 and 1997, Hutton appeared on the Nine Network as their resident authority on fashion, beauty & style.

Hutton has been the host of the top rating Location Location, Amazing Homes, and Celebrity Overhaul. She has also been a regular contributor on the Nine Network's Fresh food programme, been a guest reporter on Getaway and hosted Nine's one-hour special Second Chance.

In 2011, Hutton moved to Foxtel, hosting shows on the BIO Channel.

From November 2012 to 2015, Hutton was the presenter of the Foxtel Movie Show. In September 2015, Foxtel Arts launched a new monthly art show called Event, hosted by Hutton. Filmed in the Foxtel studios, Event explored Australian music, theatre, visual arts and books.

=== Editor ===
For more than ten years Hutton was an editor of the Australian Women's Weekly. She started with the beauty pages and then went on to become the fashion editor and then editor-at-large (Home).

=== Business ventures ===
For more than 10 years, Hutton was the national ambassador for Grace Bros and Myer. She represented them as a spokesman and hosted a variety of corporate functions, VIP nights, and seminars.

Hutton was an ambassador for Qantas for over 10 years. In that role she was the presenter on the in-flight video guide, and acted as host for major Qantas events. Hutton has also been a spokesman for Holden endorsing and promoting its cars.

In September 2004, Hutton launched her range of homewares "Living with Deborah Hutton" for Kmart. In 2006, she became the brand ambassador for Olay Regenerist and created her branded eyewear "Deborah Hutton Optical". She was the spokesman for the "At Home at Hyatt" campaign for the Lendlease residential development at the Hyatt Regency Coolum Resort on the Sunshine Coast.

In 2011, Hutton launched her digital media community "Balance by Deborah Hutton", which hosted weekly video interviews with women around the world. Hutton discontinued the website in 2019, finding she no longer had the energy to run it.

Deborah Hutton is an ambassador of the Australian Women Chamber of Commerce and Industry (AWCCI) and sits on the AWCCI Advisory Board.

== Charity ==
Hutton is Ambassador for the Skin Cancer Foundation, the Olivia Newton-John Cancer and Wellness Centre, and supports the work of the Starlight Children's Foundation.

== Personal life ==
Hutton was in a long-term relationship with Harry M. Miller in the 1980s. In 2015, Hutton bought a $3.8 million house in the Sydney suburb of Bronte. In 2019, after fabricating an attempted break-in at the house in August 2018, her ex-partner, Robert Dulhunty was convicted of six offences, including stalking and intimidation, property damage, and making a fake triple-zero call. Dulhunty was also ordered to pay the New South Wales Police Force $13,040, to compensate for the time they had wasted on the case.

In 2020, Hutton underwent invasive surgery to remove two basal-cell carcinomas from her face.

In the 2025 King's Birthday Honours, Hutton was awarded the Medal of the Order of Australia for service to community health, and to media.
