= Global Effect =

1992 video game

- Developer: Millennium Interactive Ltd.
- Publisher: Millennium Interactive Ltd.
- Platforms: Acorn 32-bit, Amiga, Amiga CD32, Atari ST, DOS
- Release: 1992
- Genre: Strategy

Global Effect is a 1992 video game published by EA/Millennium Interactive.

== Gameplay ==
Global Effect is a game in which world construction and maintenance is simulated, and multiple scenarios are included for creating worlds, saving worlds, and ruling worlds. Services available to the player include waste disposal, fuel sources, power stations, and supplies of food and water. The player must keep the world environmentally clean while opposing an adversary trying to destroy it. The player must build a thriving civilization by developing the natural resources of the world. The game also allows the player to wage a thermonuclear war against neighboring civilizations. The world is generated by the computer, with its continents, oceans, and ice caps, and mineral deposits beneath the land.

== Reception ==
Reception

Review scores
Publication	Score
Amiga Action	93%
Amiga Format	67%
Zero	84%

M. Evan Brooks reviewed the game for Computer Gaming World, and stated that "A lifetime member of the Sierra Club with a Ph.D. in ecological engineering might have the drive and stamina to delve into the mechanics and playability of this product. As for the rest of us, Global Effect is closer to SimChernobyl than to SimCity."

Scott A. May for Compute! said that while "Tenacious players might eventually enjoy this complex model of environmental cause and effect", other players would not find it rewarding.

Steve White for Amiga Action called the game "probably the best planet simulator around".

Dan Slingsby for CU Amiga found that while it can be fun to create and nurture an environment, "It's just that I can think of many better games to spend my money."

Neil Jackson for Amiga Format quipped that "Unless you're intending to use it as a demonstration tool at the Earth Summit, give it a miss."

Martin Pond for Zero found the game "great fun to play" and that it would be just as fun to play as "a bit of a fascist meathead" as to play with the goal of protecting the environment.
