= Dana Bergstrom =

Australian ecologist

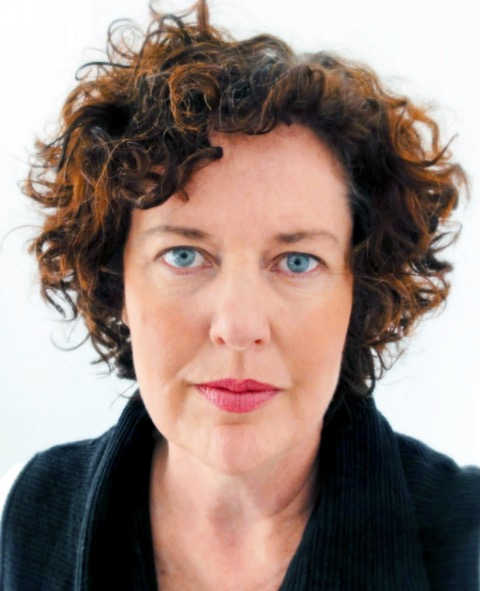
- Born: 1962 (age 63–64)
- Education: Macquarie University
- Scientific career
- Fields: Antarctic ecology
- Workplaces: Australian Antarctic Division
- Website: Bergstrom at the Australian Antarctic Division

Dana Michelle Bergstrom is an Australian ecologist with specialty in Antarctic and Australian ecosystems. She was a senior researcher at the Australian Antarctic Division for 22 years. She is noted for her work on climate change and other risks to Antarctic and Sub Antarctic Ecosystems, as well leading research identifying widespread ecosystem collapse in Australia and Antarctica and identifying means to combat them.

== Early life and education ==
Bergstrom is from Sydney, Australia. She went to Hunters Hill High School and undertook her undergraduate study at Macquarie University (Sydney). Her postgraduate study was also Macquarie University, where she completed a master's degree. Bergstrom travelled to Macquarie Island in 1983 for her Masters fieldwork, this made her one of the earliest female scientists to go south in the Australian Antarctic program for sustained field work. She continued her focus on Macquarie Island to, researching holocene vegetation for her PhD which was awarded in 1985. Prior to working at the Antarctic Division, Bergstrom was a senior lecturer in ecology and botany at The University of Queensland.

== Career and impact ==
Bergstrom is an applied Antarctic ecologist and a principal research scientist with the Australian Antarctic Division where she co-ordinates terrestrial and near-shore research. Her research focuses on identifying risks to Antarctic and Sub-Antarctic ecosystems and finding solutions to mitigating such risks. During the International Polar Year she led the "Aliens in Antarctica" program and she has played a major leadership roles in the SCAR Regional Sensitivities to Climate Change (RISCC) and Evolution and Biodiversity in Antarctica programs. The Aliens in Antarctica project resulted in major changes to how most national programs and tourist operators manage biosecurity in Antarctica particularly with regards to cleaning gear to avoid carrying seeds to Antarctica. As Bergstrom put it, "the people that were carrying the most had lots and lots of seeds. They really were substantial threats."

Bergstrom has published extensively on Antarctic science and is well recognised for her highly influential work in the invasive species field, for quantifying the effects of cat eradication on Macquarie Island and for her abundant work on Antarctic and sub-Antarctic plant ecology and threats. Bergstrom is also a champion of improving biosecurity efforts in the Antarctic (e.g. 'Aliens in Antarctica' program). She was on the design team for the Cargo and Biosecurity Centre at Hobart's Macquarie Wharf (Australia's gateway to the Antarctic).

Bergstrom was the Australian delegate to the Scientific Committee on Antarctic Research from 2011–2015. Bergstrom has been the Australian national representative for the SSG-LS (SCAR standing group – life sciences). She was also the chair of the National Antarctic Research Committee at the Australian Academy of Science (2011–2014), where she was key to fostering engagement with various national and international Antarctic organisations. Bergstrom is active in providing mentoring and training for early career researchers.

Bergstrom invests heavily in public outreach of Antarctic science, where she promotes the global importance of Antarctic ecosystems and researching in the Antarctic. She has been interviewed numerous times for paper, television and radio interviews. Bergstrom founded the 'Pure Antarctic Foundation', a non-for-profit organisation with the overarching goal to bring Antarctica to the world, via an immersive cultural and scientific experience. She championed the efforts to install sub-Antarctic displays in the Royal Hobart Botanic gardens and Australian National Botanic Gardens in order for the public to be able to experience the unique flora of remote sub-Antarctic islands.

Bergstrom was the book author of "Antarctica", a new musical, which premiered in October 2016 in Hobart at the Theatre Royal. The show aimed to foster an appreciation for Antarctic ecosystems.

In 2021 she won the Australian Museum Eureka Prize in the Leadership in Innovation and Science category.

== Selected works ==
- Bergstrom, Dana M., et al. "Rapid collapse of a sub‐Antarctic alpine ecosystem: the role of climate and pathogens." Journal of Applied Ecology 52.3 (2015): 774–783.
- Bergstrom, Dana M., et al. "Indirect effects of invasive species removal devastate World Heritage Island." Journal of Applied Ecology 46.1 (2009): 73–81.
- Frenot, Yves, et al. "Biological invasions in the Antarctic: extent, impacts and implications." Biological reviews 80.01 (2005): 45–72.
- Bergstrom, Dana M., and Steven L. Chown. "Life at the front: history, ecology and change on southern ocean islands." Trends in Ecology & Evolution 14.12 (1999): 472–477.
