= Hunters Hill High School =

Location
- Hunters Hill, New South Wales; Australia; 33°49′56″S 151°8′54″E

Information
- Type: Public, co-educational, secondary, day school
- Motto: Latin: Opera Ad Maiora (Latin for Work for Higher Endeavour)
- Established: 1958
- Principal: Greg Lill
- Enrolment: ~700 (7–12)
- Campus: Suburban
- Colours: Blue and grey
- Website: huntershd-h.schools.nsw.gov.au

Hunters Hill High School (HHHS) is a public, secondary, co-educational day school, located in Hunters Hill. Sydney, New South Wales, Australia. It is situated on the Lane Cove River, near the Fig Tree Bridge.

HHHS was established in 1958. Today the school is a comprehensive high school catering for approximately 585 students from Years 7 to 12, with most residing in the Inner West and lower North Shore.

Hunters Hill High School is a school of the New South Wales Department of Education and prepares students for the School Certificate (Year 10), and the Higher School Certificate (Year 12).

== History ==
The first Principal, J.S. Rae, was responsible for the initial intake of 368 students and staff of twenty. In Form 1, the equivalent of Year 7 today, classes went from 1A to 1M with as many as 48 students to a class.

The school colours chosen were two shades of blue and grey with the motto Opera Ad Maiora, which may be translated from Latin to "Work for Higher Endeavour". The sporting houses, reflecting the history of the area, were named after the ferries that originally carried patrons to the picnic grounds: Rawson, Napier, Ferguson and Carrington.

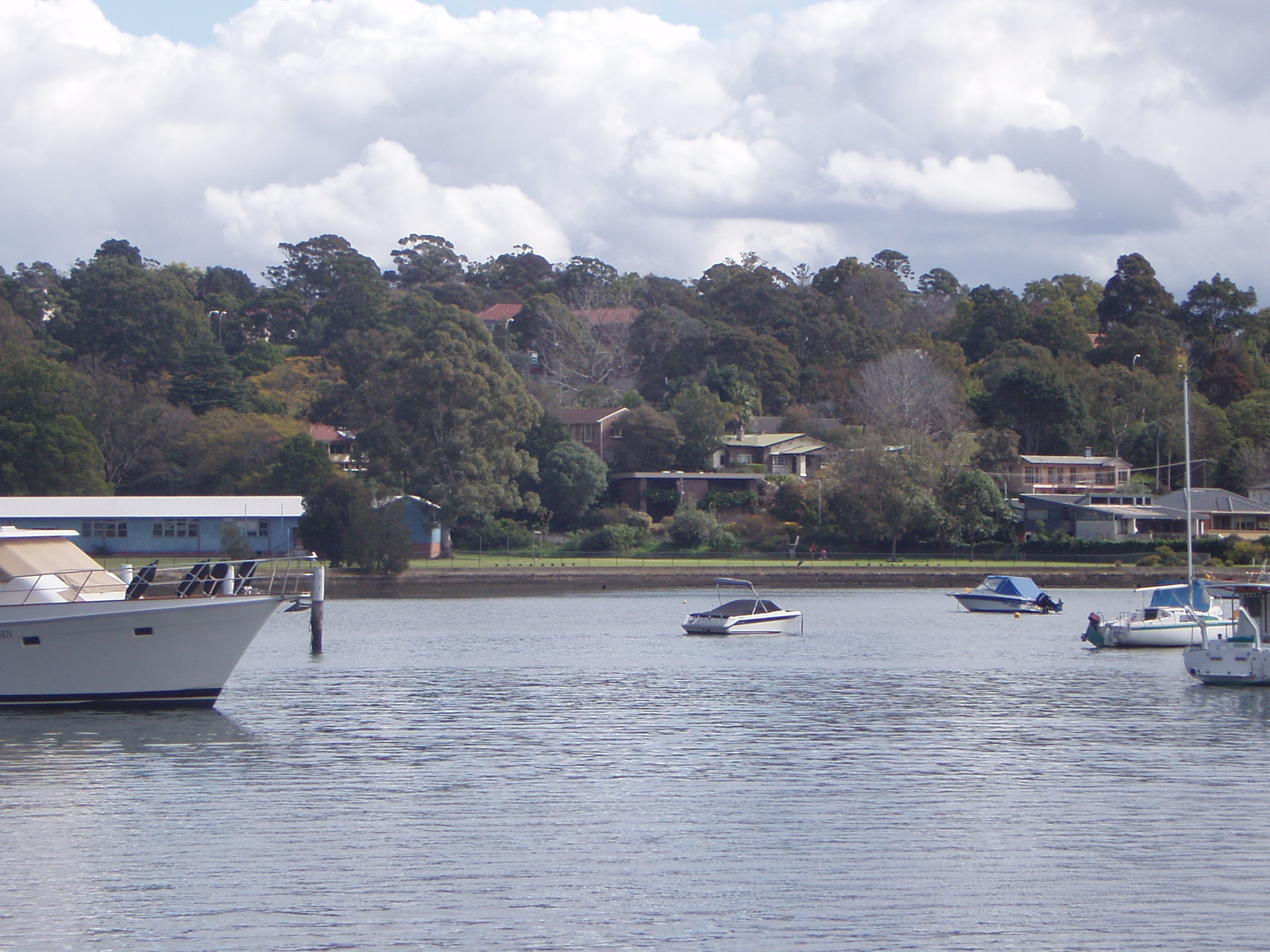
View of the school and Lane Cove River from Linley Point

By the time the school was officially opened on 9 August 1962, by the Governor of New South Wales, Eric Woodward. enrolments had grown to 927 with a staff of 47. Classroom blocks had been built along with the senior block, including science laboratories, art rooms and general classrooms following in 1969. In 1973 the Premier of New South Wales, Eric Willis, opened the new library plus further classrooms and laboratories.

To much controversy, the school was threatened with closure by the New South Wales Government in 2002, as part of its Building the Future plan. The school had been chosen for closure due to the number of competing private and selective schools in the area, and thus a drop in enrolments over recent years. It was estimated that the school could be sold for over A$55 million. Teachers and students protested against the sale, and in 2002, following the commencement of the Save Hunters Hill High School Act 2002, drafted by Kerry Chikarovski, former New South Wales opposition leader, the decision was withdrawn just weeks before the planned closure date.

In 2017, former principal Judith Felton announced her retirement. Greg Lill was subsequently appointed as principal.

== Campus ==
Hunters Hill High School is located on a single campus, six hectares in size, in suburban Hunters Hill. The site features natural bushland, and sits on the southern shore of the Lane Cove River.

In 2000, the school's historic pavilion hall was burned down, causing upset to local residents and the school community. In 2006 a new school hall was completed.

== Notable alumni ==
- Dana Bergstrom, ecologist, Antarctic researcher
- Rose Byrne, actor
- John Pearce, member of Justice Crew and auxiliary member of The Wiggles
- Steve Tuynman, Australian rugby union representative.

== See also ==
- List of Government schools in New South Wales
