= Sally Robinson =

English-born Australian artist

- Born: 1952 (age 73–74)
- Known for: artist, painter printmaker

Sally Robinson (born 1952) is an English-born Australian artist. She has had a long career as a portrait artist and designer, painter and printmaker, teacher and lecturer. Her work is represented in private and public collections around Australia.

== Early life and education ==
Robinson was born in England in 1952 and emigrated to Australia in 1960.

She studied for four years at the National Art School in Sydney, graduating in 1973.

== Career ==
=== Designer and lecturer ===
From 1974 to 1983 Robinson worked at the Australian Museum in Sydney as a designer, a position which allowed her to travel to remote areas of Australia. In her private practice in her studio, Robinson’s screen prints captured those places, and established her reputation in the printmaking community.

From 1976 to 1983 Robinson was also teaching part-time at Alexander Mackie College (subsequently renamed the City Art Institute). After leaving the Museum Robinson spent four years as a full-time lecturer at the City Art Institute (which became the College of Fine Arts, UNSW and is now called UNSW Art & Design).

=== Career and early years ===
From the 1970s till the early 1990s Sally Robinson worked as a fine art screen printer. She became recognised in the Australian printmaking community for bold and humorous depictions of Australian culture, landscape, flora and fauna, which were collected by private and State Galleries. These screen prints depicted iconic tourist destinations around the country such as Bondi Beach, Uluru (Ayers Rock), Kakadu, The Twelve Apostles.

After receiving an Australian Antarctic Division Humanities Program Award in 1991, Robinson travelled to the Australian bases of Mawson, Davis, and Heard Island. This voyage resulted in a series of ten silk screen prints documenting her response to the ice, history and wildlife of Antarctica.

=== Mature career ===
In the late 1990s Robinson made a shift from silk screens back to painting, which was her first love, incorporating and adapting the stencil technique from printmaking to create dynamic, pixelated surface textures in acrylic on linen canvas. The resulting portraits have garnered critical attention for the sensitivity of the portraits combined with the boldly fragmented surfaces. A deeply moving portrait of "The Artist's Mother" in the final stage of terminal cancer won the Portia Geach Memorial Award in 2012. This portrait travelled to the Embassy of Australia in Washington, D.C. as part of a group exhibition by Portrait Artists Australia.

Robinson has received many portrait commissions, both private and institutional. Portrait commissions include Sir Keith Peters, Regis Professor of Physic (for Cambridge University UK), Sir Bruce Ponder, Emeritus Professor of Oncology at the University of Cambridge (for CRUK Institute, Cambridge, UK); Mary Gaudron, first woman High Court Judge of Australia (for NSW Law Society) and Professor Sir Keith Peters for the Academy of Medical Sciences, London. Robinson’s portrait of Brett Weymark, the conductor of the Sydney Philharmonia Choirs, was hung in a group exhibition by Portrait Artists Australia at the Australian Parliament House in Canberra in 2012. Robinson's portrait of Tim Winton was hung in the 2019 Darling Portrait Prize in the National Portrait Gallery (Australia), and subsequently acquired for the collection.

Robinson has created a series of penetrating self-portraits, one of which won the Portia Geach Memorial Award in 2019 – "Body in A Box".

Robinson has exhibited her work in numerous solo and group exhibitions all around Australia during her 45-year career. As of 2020 Sally Robinson's studio and gallery are located in the historic Astor building in Macquarie Street, Sydney.

== Awards and recognition ==
Robinson has been a frequent finalist in major art competitions including the Archibald Prize, the Doug Moran Portrait Prize, the Blake Prize, and the Darling Portrait Prize.

She has also been awarded several prizes, including:

- 2015: Gallipoli Art Prize, for her painting "Boy Soldiers" commemorating the deaths of the youngest soldiers, stencilling their names across the image of the graveyard in Lone Pine Cemetery in Turkey
- 2016: Shirley Hannan National Portrait Award at the Bega Valley Regional Gallery, for her portrait "Ella Rubeli"
- 2012: Portia Geach Memorial Award
- 2019: Portia Geach Memorial Award
- 2021: Kennedy Prize, for "Bruce Squared", a portrait of her husband, Bruce Pussell

== Collections ==
Robinson's works are represented in many corporate collections as well as regional and major galleries across Australia and internationally, including:

Australian National Gallery, Canberra; National Portrait Gallery, Canberra; National Gallery of New Zealand; Museum of Contemporary Art, Sydney; Art Gallery of NSW; National Gallery of Victoria; Art Gallery of South Australia; Queensland Art Gallery; Tasmanian Museum and Art Gallery, Hobart; Queen Victoria Museum and Art Gallery, Launceston; Art Gallery of Western Australia; Museums and Art Galleries of the Northern Territory; Govett-Brewster Art Gallery, NZ; Parliament House, Canberra; Artbank; Fremantle Art Gallery, WA; Geelong Art Gallery, Victoria; Penrith Regional Art Gallery, NSW; New England Regional Art Gallery, NSW; Shepparton Art Centre, Victoria; Burnie Art Gallery, Tasmania; Albury Art Gallery, NSW; Bega Vallery Regional Gallery; Wollongong Art Gallery, NSW; Warrnambool Regional Art Gallery, Victoria; Wagga Wagga City Art Gallery, NSW; Parliament House, Sydney; Australian Museum, Sydney; Australian Antarctic Division, Hobart; NSW Bar Association, Sydney; The University of New South Wales, Sydney; Sydney University, Sydney; Macquarie University, NSW; University of Wollongong, NSW; University of Western Australia, Perth; John Curtin Prime Ministerial Library, Curtin University of Technology, Perth; Monash University, Victoria; University of Technology, Brisbane; University of Tasmania, Hobart; WA Institute of Technology; Queensland University of Technology; Griffith University, Queensland; Fitzroy Library, Victoria; Academy of Medical Sciences, London UK; School of Clinical Medicine, University of Cambridge, UK; CRUK Institute, Cambridge University, UK; Faculty of Medicine, UNSW, Sydney; University of Wollongong, NSW
