= Dust Off the Wings =

- Directed by: Lee Rogers
- Written by: Lee Rogers; Ward Stevens
- Starring: Lee Rogers; Felix Williamson; Kate Ceberano; Phil Cebrano
- Release date: 1997
- Country: Australia
- Language: English
- Box office: A$202,099 (Australia)

Dust Off the Wings is a 1997 Australian film about a young man struggling to come to terms with his impending marriage.

== Production ==
The film was partly inspired by Lee Rogers' marriage to Kate Ceberano in 1995. The film was shot on digi Betacam in 17 days over several weekends in April and May 1996 at Bondi Beach. Two-thirds of the film was scripted the rest was improvised.

== Release ==
Rogers announced plans to make two sequels, Speck of Dust (to do with pregnancy) and Dust to Dust (to do with death). However, as of 2025 neither had been made.
