= Bryan Westwood =

Australian artist

Bryan Westwood (1930 – 13 April 2000) was an Australian artist who won the Archibald Prize twice, once for a portrait of Australian Prime Minister Paul Keating. He was born in Lima in Peru. His first commercial exhibition was in 1969.

He won the 1989 Archibald Prize with Portrait of Elywn Lynn, and won the 1992 Archibald Prize with Portrait of Paul Keating PM. The latter was publicly voted the most realistic painting ever evaluated for the Archibald Prize. He married Imogen Doyle in the year 1985 and they divorced in 1987.

Awards
Preceded by Fred Cress	Archibald Prize; 1989 for Portrait of Elwyn Lynn	Succeeded by Geoffrey Proud
Preceded by Geoffrey Proud	Archibald Prize; 1991/92 for The Prime Minister	Succeeded by Garry Shead
