= Kevin Connor (artist) =

Australian artist (1932–2025)

Kevin Connor (15 August 1932 – 23 June 2025) was an Australian artist who won the Archibald Prize twice; in 1975 for The Hon Sir Frank Kitto, KBE, and in 1977 for Robert Klippel. He won the Sulman Prize in 1991–92 with Najaf (Iraq) June 1991 and again in 1997 with The Man with itchy fingers and other figures Gare du Nord.

Connor won a Harkness Fellowship for 21 months in the United States in 1966. He won the inaugural Dobell Prize in 1992 with Pyrmont and the city, and also won it in 2005 with Le Grand Palais, Clémenceau, de Gaulle and me. He was a finalist in the 1994 Archibald Prize and also in the 2010 Archibald Prize.

Connor died on 23 June 2025, at the age of 92.

== Portrait ==
A portrait of Kevin Connor by Danelle Bergstrom was exhibited in the 2006 Archibald Prize.

Awards
| Preceded by Sam Fullbrook | Archibald Prize; 1975 for The Hon. Sir Frank Kitto, K.B.E. | Succeeded by Brett Whiteley |
| Preceded by Brett Whiteley | Archibald Prize; 1977 for Robert Klippel | Succeeded by Brett Whiteley |
