= Portia Geach Memorial Award =

Annual prize for Australian female portraitists

The Portia Geach Memorial Award is an annual prize for Australian female portraitists. The Award was established in 1961 as a testamentary trust by Florence Kate Geach, sister of Australian painter Portia Geach, with an initial endowment of AU£12,000. The first prize given under the aegis of the Award was made in 1965, comprising a £1,000 prize to Jean Appleton for a self-portrait. In 2015, the Award was worth A$30,000.

The Award aims to support female artists working in the field of portraits painted from life, and is given based upon the field entries submitted to the Award. Under the terms of the initial endowment, the Award is designed to recognise:

... the best portraits painted from life of some man or woman distinguished in Art, Letters or the Sciences by any female artist resident in Australia during the 12 months preceding the date fixed by the Trustees for sending in the pictures and who was born in Australia or was British born or has become a naturalised Australian and whose place of domicile is Australia.

== Previous winners ==
Past winners of the award have been:

- 2026 – Natasha Bieniek, The folding
- 2025 – Michelle Hiscock,The Weather Watcher after Zurbarán
- 2024 – Lori Pensini, The Conversation #3
- 2023 – Kate Stevens, The Whistleblower (portrait of David McBride)
- 2022 – Lynn Savery, Kindred Spirits
- 2021 – Marie Mansfield, Tilly
- 2020 – Caroline Zilinsky, Anthea May or May Not (portrait of Anthea Pilko, dancer)
- 2019 – Sally Robinson, Body in a box (self-portrait) – image
- 2018 – Zoe Young, Drawing Storyboards (portrait of Bruce Beresford) – image
- 2017 – Amanda Davies, Portrait of Pat Brassington – image
- 2016 – Jenny Rodgerson, Bound by the big red coat – image
- 2015 – Natasha Bieniek, Sahara – image
- 2014 – Sophie Cape, Romper Stomper – image
- 2013 – Hélène Grove, Self Portrait. Getting On – image
- 2012 – Sally Robinson, The Artist's Mother – image
- 2011 – Kate Stevens, Indian Dream – image
- 2010 – Prudence Flint, Scrambled egg – image
- 2009 – Christine Hiller, The Old Painter
- 2008 – Jude Rae, Self Portrait 2008 (The Year My Husband Left)
- 2007 – Maryanne Coutts, Melbourne
- 2006 – Lucy Culliton, Self with Friends
- 2005 – Jude Rae, Large Interior (Micky Allan)
- 2004 – Nerrisa Lea, The Sheik & Me, Self Portrait with Imagined Portrait of Chad Morgan after Frida Kahlo
- 2003 – Wendy Sharpe, Self Portrait with Tea Cup and Burning Paintings
- 2002 – Vicki Varvaressos, Self Portrait with Painting
- 2001 – Mary Moore, At Home
- 2000 – Nancy Borlase, The Sisters: Marie and Vida Breckenridge – image (NPG)
- 1999 – Kim Spooner, Social Currency (Eva Cox) – image (NPG)
- 1998 – Anita Rezevska, Self Portrait – Woman from Riga
- 1997 – Maria Isabel, Cruz Maria
- 1996 – Su Baker, Self Portrait at Six Paces
- 1995 – Wendy Sharpe, Self Portrait with Students, After Adelaide Labille-Guiard
- 1994 – Jenny Sages, Ann Thomson
- 1993 – Aileen Rogers, Suzanne Mourot
- 1992 – Jenny Sages, Nancy Borlase and Laurie Short – image (NPG)
- 1991 – Rosemary Valadon, Frances Joseph
- 1990 – Jenny Watson, Self Portrait
- 1989 – Jenny Sands, Alex Karpin
- 1988 – Margaret Ackland, Shay Docking
- 1987 – Christine Hiller, Self Portrait
- 1986 – Christine Hiller, Self Portrait
- 1985 – Gwen Eichler, Dianne Fogwell
- 1984 – Margaret Woodward, Madeleine Halliday
- 1983 – Margaret Woodward, Self Portrait
- 1982 – Brenda Humble, Virginia Hall
- 1981 – Susan Howard, Jenny Kee
- 1980 – Judy Pennefather, Venie Schulenberg
- 1979 – Ivy Shore, Kondelea (Della) Elliott
- 1978 – Dora Toovey, Senator Neville Bonner
- 1977 – Ena Joyce, George Lawrence
- 1976 – Jocelyn Maughan, George Bouckley
- 1975 – Mary Brady, Elizabeth Rooney
- 1974 – Lesley H Pockley, Hugh Paget
- 1973 – Sylvia Tiarks, Self Portrait
- 1972 – Elizabeth Cummings, Jean Appleton
- 1971 – Mary Brady, Larry Sitsky – image (NPG)
- 1970 – Dora Toovey, Self Portrait in Landscape
- 1969 – Vaike Liibus, Guy Warren
- 1968 – Bettina McMahon, Self Portrait
- 1967 – Jo Caddy, Lawrence Daws
- 1966 – Mary Brady, Grahame Edgar
- 1965 – Jean Appleton, Self Portrait
