= Alexander Mackie College =

Alexander Mackie College was a tertiary education institution that trained school teachers in Sydney, Australia. It existed from 1958 to 1974 continuing as Alexander Mackie College of Advanced Education from 1975 to 1981. In January 1982 the college was reformed into two institutes, St George Institute of Education and City Art Institute under the umbrella of the new Sydney College of Advanced Education.

== History ==
Alexander Mackie College (AMC) was established in 1958 at Paddington. Mr. W. E. Hart was its first principal and Dr Campbell the deputy principal. The college initially trained primary and infant school teachers. Later it became a college training teachers in art, music, science and social science.

Due to increasing student numbers the main teaching campus in Albion Avenue was too small and the college conducted classes at five different sites in inner-Sydney.

From 1 September 1971, Alexander Mackie College was declared a college of advanced education within the Department of Education, NSW.

== Notable people ==
Students:

- David Keeling, artist
- Frances Phoenix, feminist artist
- Graeme Townsend, artist

Teachers:

- Maurice Saxby, literary critic
