= Garry Shead =

Australian artist and filmmaker

Garry Shead is an Australian artist and filmmaker. His paintings are in many galleries in Australia and overseas, and he has won several awards, including the Archibald Prize in 1992. He has spent time in Japan, Papua New Guinea, France, Austria, and Hungary, returning to Australia in the 1980s.

== Early life and education ==
Born in Sydney, New South Wales, he studied at the National Art School in the 1960s.

== Career ==
He was a founding member of the Ubu Films collective in the late 1960s, with whom he made numerous experimental film works, and he also worked for the ABC as an editor, cartoonist, filmmaker and scenic painter before his first major solo exhibition with Watters Gallery in Sydney. He was a friend of Brett Whiteley and participated in the famous Yellow House activities.

He has shown in more than seventy group exhibitions and had over fifty solo exhibitions, as well as illustrating numerous books.

He spent six months in Paris in 1973. In the 1980s he spent time in France, Spain, Italy and Holland.

During a residency at the Karolyi Foundation, in Vence in southern France, he met Hungarian sculptor Judith Englert, and spent a year in Budapest with her before returning to Australia. In 1987 they eventually settled in the seaside suburb of Bundeena, south of Sydney. During the late 1980s his style (figurative, allegoric, lyric, moody) crystallized with the Bundeena paintings, the Queen series and the D. H. Lawrence series. This last is based mainly on Lawrence's novel Kangaroo (novel), which was inspired by the Lawrences' stay at Thirroul, near Wollongong. Shead became interested in Lawrence after he came across letters by the author while on an expedition with the ABC to the Sepik Highlands in Papua New Guinea in 1968.

The 21st century saw him branch out into a complex set of paintings celebrating the Ern Malley series of hoax poems.

== Personal life ==
He married Judith Englert, a Hungarian artist and sculptor in her own right. They had one child.

== Awards ==
Shead won the Young Contemporaries Prize in 1967.

He won the Archibald Prize in 1993 with a portrait of Tom Thompson. He also painted a portrait of Brett Whiteley's ex-wife Wendy Whiteley for the Archibald Prize, but that entry did not win. He was a finalist in the Archibald Prize in 2009 and 2012.

He won the Dobell Prize in 2004 with Colloquy with John Keats.

== Collections ==
Shead is represented in the National Gallery of Australia and all state galleries, many regional galleries and numerous private and corporate collections, both nationally and internationally.

Awards
Preceded by Bryan Westwood	Archibald Prize; 1992/93 for Tom Thompson	Succeeded by Francis Giacco
