= Kerrie Lester =

Australian painter

- Born: 31 May 1953; Surry Hills, Sydney, Australia
- Died: 5 April 2016 (aged 62); Sydney, Australia
- Education: National Art School; Alexander Mackie College
- Awards: Mosman Art Prize; 2011 Out on a Limb

Kerrie Lester (31 May 1953 – 5 April 2016) was an Australian artist who was a frequent finalist in the Archibald Prize for portraiture, although she never won the main prize.

She was born to John Lester and Dolores Metcalfe at the Crown Street Women's Hospital in Surry Hills, Sydney in 1953, and studied fine arts at the National Art School and the Alexander Mackie College of Advanced Education between 1971 and 1975. She held her first solo exhibition in 1976.

Lester was a finalist in the Archibald Prize sixteen times, but never won. She did win the associated Packing Room Prize in 1998, for her Self-portrait as a bridesmaid—an allusion to the saying "Always a bridesmaid, never the bride" in relation to her missing out on the Archibald so regularly, and she stopped entering the competition in 2012. Nonetheless, the display of her work at the shortlist exhibitions increased her profile, and the National Portrait Gallery acquired or commissioned her portraits of Margaret Fink, Fred Hollows, James Morrison and Cathy Freeman. She was also a finalist in the Portia Geach Memorial Award nine times, and was a regular finalist and exhibitor in the Wynne Prize and Sir John Sulman Prize group exhibitions. In 2011, she won the Mosman Art Prize for her painting Out on a Limb.

In 2014, she was diagnosed with leukemia, stopping treatment after two stem cell transplants failed to stop the progression of the disease. She died on 5 April 2016, aged 62.
