= Nigel Thomson =

Australian artist

Nigel Thomson (1945–1999) was an Australian artist who won the Archibald Prize twice. Known for satirical paintings of Australian society. He studied at the Julian Ashton Art School in Sydney and later taught artistic composition at that institution. He was art tutor at the Royal Academy of Art in The Hague.

He won the Archibald with Chandler Coventry in 1983, and Barbara Blackman in 1997. Thomson's painting of Patrick White's long-term partner Manoly Lascaris was rejected from the 1995 Archibald and hung in the Salon des Refusés.

He won the Sulman Prize in 1983 with Marat, The Unsophisticated will be Shocked by the Depiction of your Death: or, the Artist Answers His Critics. This painting was based on Jacques-Louis David's famous painting Death of Marat showing Jean-Paul Marat dead in a bathtub.

He jointly won the Sulman Prize in 1986 along with Wendy Sharpe, for The State Institution.

Awards
Preceded by Eric Smith	Archibald Prize; 1983 for Chandler Coventry	Succeeded by Keith Looby
Preceded by Wendy Sharpe	Archibald Prize; 1997 for Barbara Blackman	Succeeded by Lewis Miller
