= Eric Smith (artist) =

Australian artist (1919–2017)

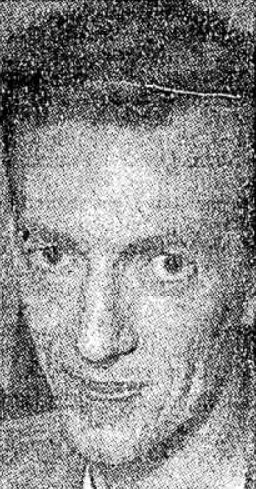
- Eric Smith in 1954.
- Born: Eric John Smith; 5 August 1919; Brunswick, Melbourne, Australia
- Died: 20 February 2017 (aged 97); Sydney, NSW, Australia
- Known for: Painting

Eric John Smith (5 August 1919 – 20 February 2017) was an Australian artist. Smith won the Archibald Prize for portraiture three times; the Wynne Prize twice; the Sulman Prize three times; and the Blake Prize for Religious Art six times.

== Life and work ==
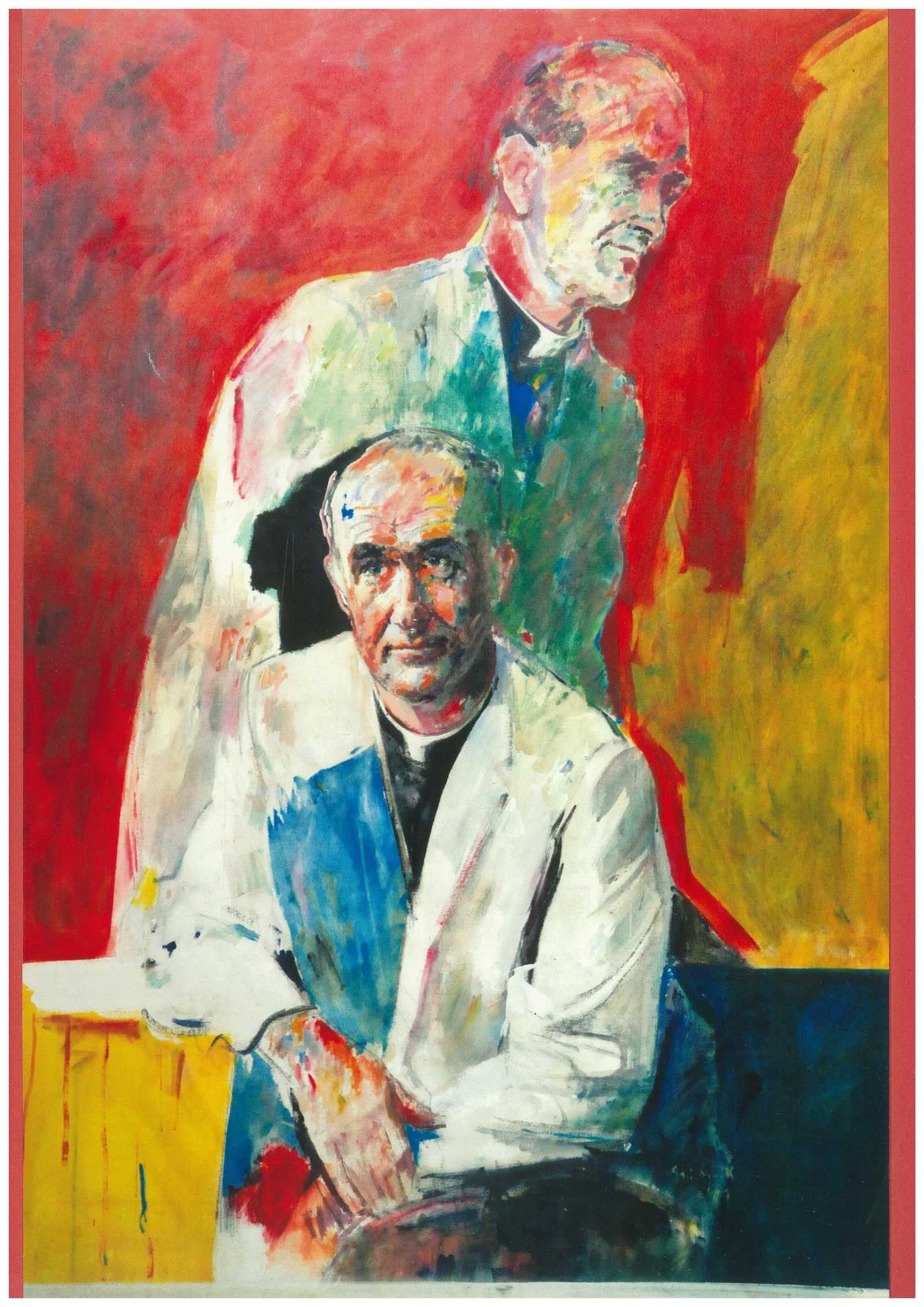
Roger Pryke painting by Eric Smith

Eric Smith was born and raised in Brunswick, Melbourne. At the age of 17 Smith undertook the study of Commercial Art and Painting at the Brunswick Technical School and joined the Victorian Artists Society. In 1940 Smith joined the Australian Army for the remainder of the Second World War.

Upon the end of the war, Smith returned to Melbourne and pursued his artistic ambitions. In 1945, a self-portrait painted on an army canvas was runner-up for the Archibald Prize. In 1956 Smith had his work shown in the Macquarie Galleries, Sydney, during the 'Direction One' exhibition. The success of this exhibition led to Smith's work being included in the 1963 exhibition of Australian art shown at the Tate Gallery in London. Whilst in London in 1963, Smith gained further international recognition after winning the Helena Rubenstein Art Award. In 1970 Smith won the Archibald again for his portrait of Sydney architect Neville Gruzman. The award announced on 22 January 1971 came 25 years after his second place.

Smith's second winning portrait of art dealer and gallery owner Rudy Komon entered in the 1981 Archibald Prize caused controversy within the art world. In 1975 John Bloomfield's winning entry was disqualified due to his portraiture of Tim Burstall being painted from a photograph. It is a condition of entry that all portraits be painted from life rather than interpretations of photographs. Bloomfield asserted that Smith's portraiture of Komon resembled a photograph taken of the subject in 1974 and hence was in breach of the competition rules. Bloomfield threatened legal action to prevent the prize being awarded to Smith. The controversy subsided when Komon came to Smith's defence and said he had sat for Smith many times over the previous twenty-one years.

In 1982 Smith won the Archibald for the second year in a row and his third time with a portrait of Australian composer Peter Sculthorpe.

Eric Smith was recognised for his contribution to the visual arts with an Australia Council Emeritus Award in 1995.

A total of 13 paintings are in the Art Gallery of NSW collection.

== Awards ==
- 1944 Australia at War, War on Land Prize
- 1948 Catholic Centenary Art Prize
- 1948 CRTS Shell Company Prize
- 1948 CRTS Norman Bros Prize
- 1950 Victorian Artists’ Society, ‘60 Drawings’ Herald Prize
- 1953 Berrima Art Prize (Mural)
- 1955 Contemporary Art Society
- 1955 Contemporary Art Society, Madach Prize
- 1955 Adelaide Advertiser Prize
- 1956 Bathurst Art Prize
- 1960 Journalists’ Club Prize
- 1962 Royal Art Society of New South Wales Easter Show Prize
- 1963 Helena Rubenstein Art Award
- 1965 Roy H. Taffs Contemporary Art Society Award
- 1967 Darcy Morris Memorial Prize
- 1969 Royal Art Society of New South Wales, Portrait Prize
- 1975 Muswellbrook Art Prize

Awards
Preceded by Charles Doutney	Sulman Prize; 1953 for Convicts Berrima 1839, Mural at Old Court House, Berrima	Succeeded by Wallace Thornton
Preceded by Donald Friend	Blake Prize for Religious Art; 1956 for The Scourged Christ	Succeeded by Elwyn Lynn
Preceded by Elwyn Lynn	Blake Prize for Religious Art; 1958 for The Moment Christ Died; 1959 for Christ is Risen	Succeeded by John Coburn
Preceded by Stanislaus Rapotec	Blake Prize for Religious Art; 1962 for Eucharistic Landscape	Succeeded by Leonard French
Preceded by Roger Kemp	Blake Prize for Religious Art; 1969 for The Apostles Creed; 1970; Co-winner with Roger Kemp for Christ's Flesh: Living, Suffering and Resurrected	Succeeded by Desiderius Orban
Preceded by Ray Crooke	Archibald Prize; 1970 for Gruzman—Architect	Succeeded by Clifton Pugh
Preceded by Margaret Woodward	Wynne Prize; 1972 for Falling Bark	Succeeded by Clem Millwood
Preceded by Peter Powditch	Sulman Prize; 1973 for The Painter Transmogrified and Mrs. Smith	Succeeded by Keith Looby
Preceded by Clem Millwood	Wynne Prize; 1974 for Redfern Landscape	Succeeded by Robert Juniper
Preceded by Not awarded (Wes Walters, 1979)	Archibald Prize; 1981 for Rudy Komon; 1982 for Peter Sculthorpe	Succeeded by Nigel Thomson
Preceded by Guan Wei	Sulman Prize; 2003 for Reflection	Succeeded by Allan Mitelman
