= Bela Bognar =

Béla Bognár
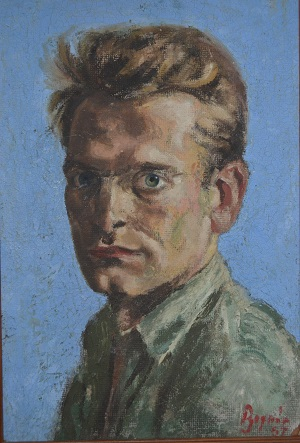
- Béla Bognár - Self Portrait
- Born: Béla Bognár; August 19, 1927 (age 97); Debrecen, Hungary
- Died: December 16, 2008 (aged 81)

Béla Bognár (1927–2008) was an artist, art writer, publisher and art dealer working in the Los Angeles area in the late 1960s.

In 1970 Béla founded the West Coast Art Center, along with peers Mr. and Mrs. Robert Robles and art writers Jeanne Good and Irene Bognár. The West Coast Art Center was dedicated to the promotion of, and education in, the burgeoning field of contemporary art in the Southwest United States. The directors of the West Coast Art Center, inspired by Bela's experience ('67-1970) as editor of Art Calendar Magazine for LACMA, planned to publish Arts West, a magazine to feature articles on contemporary art and include listings of cultural events.

Béla Bognár placed as finalist in the 1963 contest for the Sir John Sulman Prize at the Art Gallery of New South Wales located in Sydney, Australia, with his submission, a contemporary painting titled "I Am...".

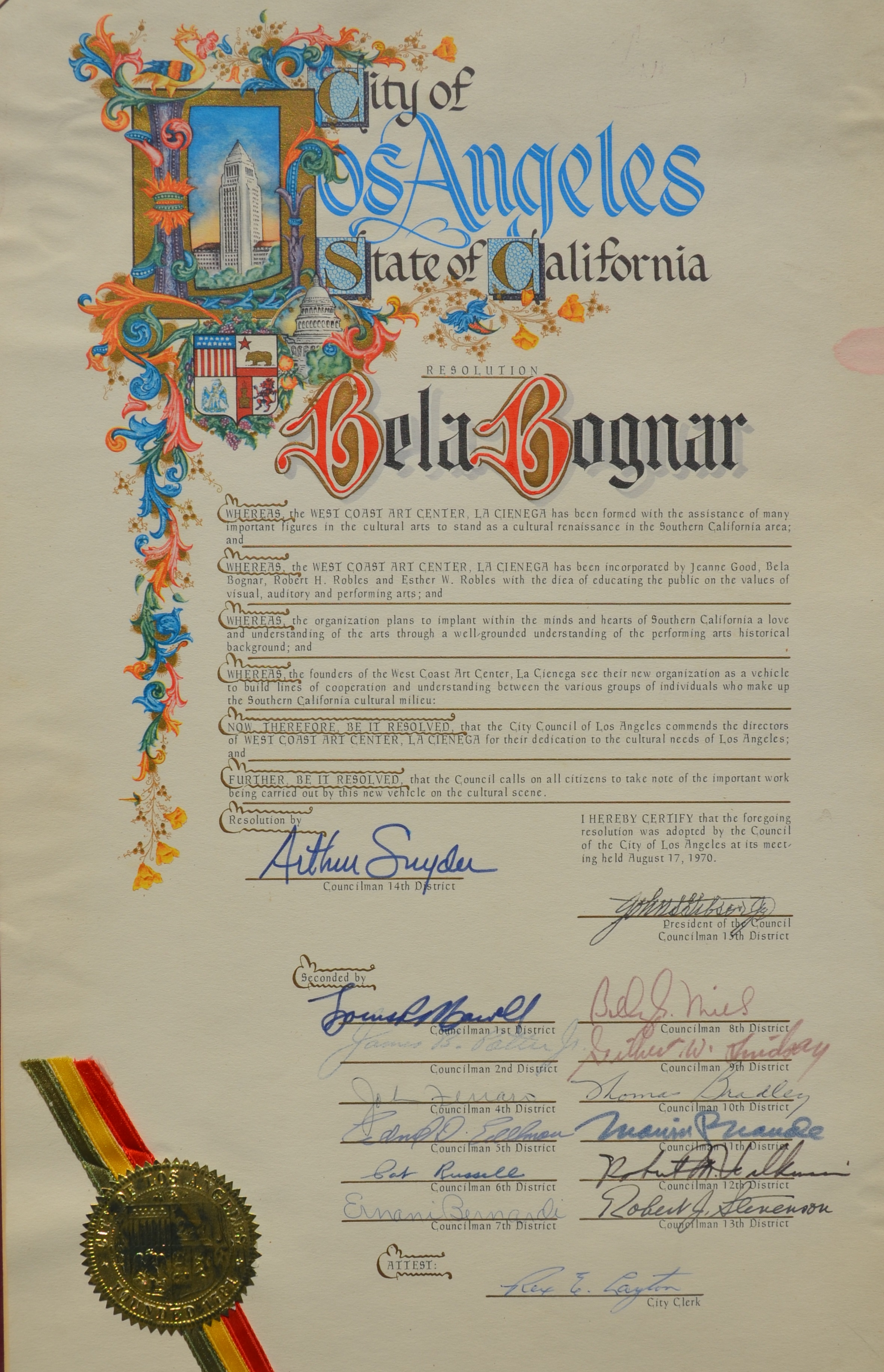
City of Los Angeles Resolution, August 17, 1970

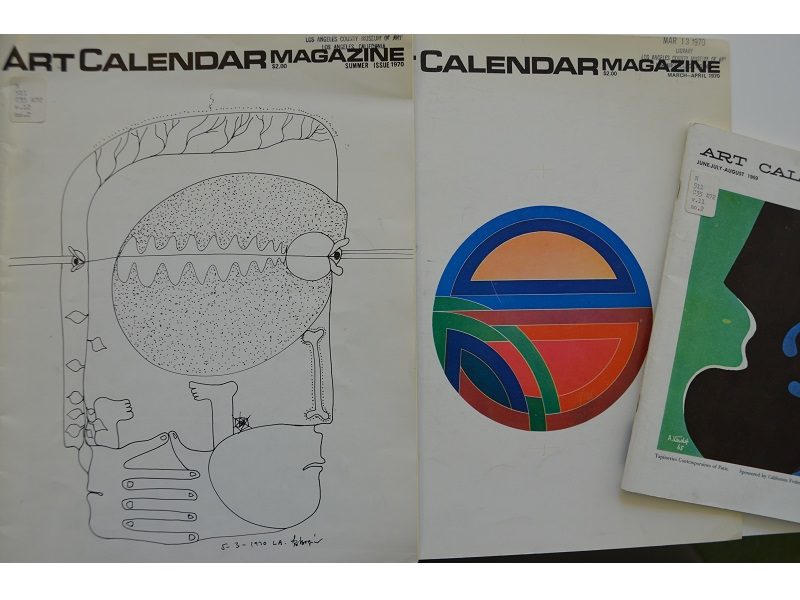
Art Calendar magazine 1970

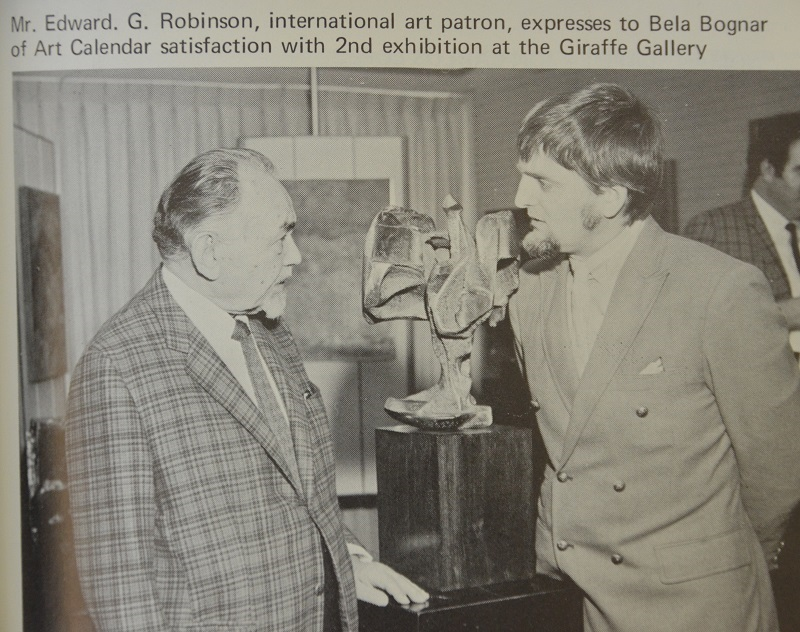
Mr. Edward. G. Robinson, international art patron, expresses to Bela Bognar of Art Calendar satisfaction with 2nd exhibition at the Giraffe Gallery.
