= William Delafield Cook =

Australian artist

William Delafield Cook AM
- Born: 28 February 1936; Caulfield, Victoria, Australia
- Died: 29 March 2015 (aged 79); London, England
- Occupation: Artist
- Parent(s): Rodin Cook and Dorothy C. Cook nee Newing.

William Delafield Cook AM (1936–2015) was an Australian artist who was known for his photorealistic landscapes. He won a number of awards, including the Order of Australia.

== Early life ==
Delafield Cook was born in Melbourne, Australia on 28 February 1936. His grandfather, who was also named William Delafield Cook, was also a painter and had links to the Heidelberg School of Australian painting.

In 1962 he married 1962 Sally Patricia Bovington, with whom he had two daughters, and a son, the artist Jonathan Delafield Cook.

== Career ==
In 1980 Delafield Cook won the Wynne Prize for A Waterfall (Strath Creek), and in 1981 he won the Sulman Prize for A French family.

Delafield Cook taught at the University of Melbourne.

== Awards ==
In 2013 Delafield Cook was appointed a Member of the Order of Australia for "significant service to the visual arts as a realist painter of Australian landscapes".

== Later life, death ==
Delafield Cook died after a brief illness in London on 29 March 2015, where he had been preparing for an exhibition; he was aged 79. He had long divided his time between London and Melbourne.

== Reception ==
Critic John McDonald, in his Art and Australia review of Deborah Hart's monograph on the artist, remarks on:

...the central dilemma of Cook’s art: that a painter who has the highest aspirations for his work should strive to make his pictures as impersonal as photographs. There is no other Australian artist who has ever achieved such an unlikely balance of grand ambition and self-effacement.

== Bibliography ==
- Hart, Deborah; Delafield Cook, William, 1936- (1998), William Delafield Cook, Craftsman House : G + B Arts International, ISBN 978-90-5703-691-0
- Pierse, Simon, Australian Art and Artists in London, 1950-1965: An Antipodean Summer Retrieved November 2012
- Sayers, Andrew, Australian Art, Oxford University Press Retrieved November 2012
- Obituary of William Delafield Cook, The Independent, 14 May 2015 Retrieved 13 August 2020
