= Robert Hollingworth =

Australian artist and writer

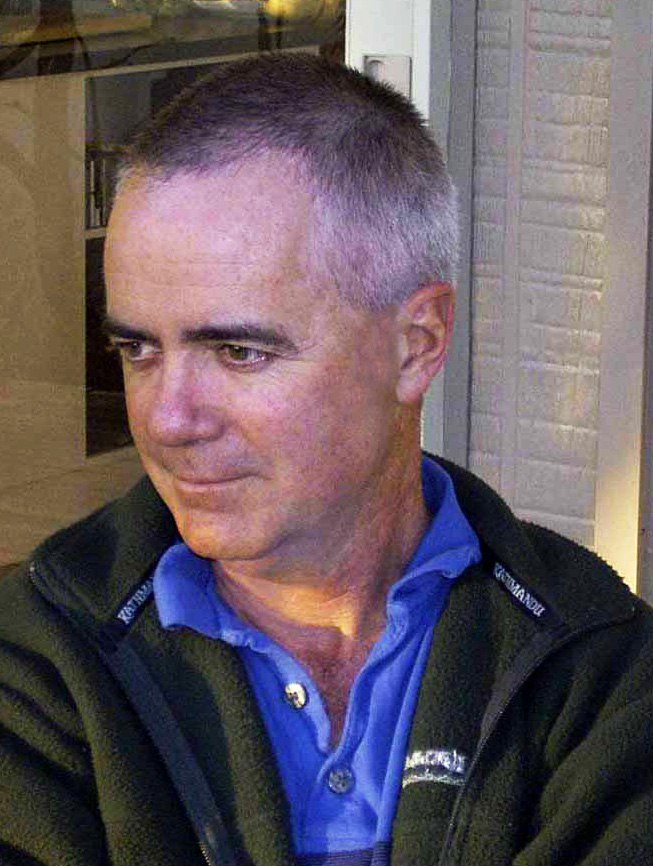
- Born: Robert James Hollingworth; Lorne, Victoria, Australia
- Education: RMIT University
- Known for: Visual Arts, Literary Works
- Website: www.roberthollingworth.com.au

Robert Hollingworth is an Australian artist and writer with an abiding interest in Australian history, environment, ecology, the natural sciences and nature in general. He now writes, paints and makes videoworks full-time.

== Background ==
Hollingworth was born at Lorne, Victoria. His parents bought 40 hectares of ocean-front land in 1947, and later, his father built White Gables. This imposing double storey residence was destroyed in the Ash Wednesday bushfires in February 1983. The farmland today accommodates some eighty modern dwellings.

His family eventually settled at Anglesea, Victoria and Hollingworth went on to complete a four-year Diploma of Art at the Gordon Technical College, Geelong. He subsequently founded the Geelong Fine Art Studios, a private art school, which he operated from 1977 to 1984. During this time he was Vice President of the Geelong Art Gallery, and co-founder of Artery, an artist-run gallery in Geelong. He moved to Melbourne in 1989 and later became a teacher/lecturer at various public institutions including RMIT University from 1996 to 2001. In 2015, he moved to Kings Point on the South Coast NSW with wife Karen Boulden. They set up THE WALL art projects in Ulladulla and established new studios.

== Art ==
Hollingworth is primarily a painter and video artist. He has held more than forty exhibitions, mostly in Australia, but also in the United States, Hong Kong and Singapore. Among other art awards, he has won the Sulman Prize 1990, the Castlemaine Drawing Prize 1994, and the Mount Buller Art Prize 2008. His work is held in many Australian public art collections, and he is represented by commercial galleries in Melbourne and Sydney.

"Hollingworth's vast paintings of astral planes and planetary systems have long offset their basis in meticulous research ... While seemingly scientific in detail and subject matter, they are in fact hypothetical-imagined spacescapes that deal with the universe's place in our collective psychology."

== Writing ==
Hollingworth began writing professionally in his late forties. His first full-length literary work was Nature Boy 2004, a part-autobiographical work detailing a little-known aspect of early Australian colonial life from the perspective of four generations of his family. This work attracted some interest on ABC Radio 774

This was followed by They called me The Wildman 2008, which was shortlisted to five for the South Australian Premier's Literary Awards in 2010, won by David Malouf. This work is an account of Henricke Nelsen's life, a 19th-century recluse in Australia and a contemporary of the bushranger, Ned Kelly. "Nelsen has a great fondness for the bush, tempered by an ambivalence regarding his place in it as an interloper. In the process of exploring this question, Hollingworth conducts an internal debate relevant not only to the 19th century but also to the 21st."

More recent novels include Smythe's Theory of Everything, 2011, reviewed on Radio National, Australia. and And So It Was, 2013; The Colour of the Night 2014.

Hollingworth is also known for his short fiction for which he has received many commendations and had published in various literary journals such as Overland and Going Down Swinging, and for his non-fiction works which include essays on contemporary art, online and in journals including Tension, Dialogue, Art Monthly Australia and Asian Art News.

In 2014, Hollingworth was awarded the London Magazine international short story award with 'The Abstractionist', which became the first chapter for a new novel, A Blank Canvas 2018.

== Bibliography ==
Books authored by Hollingworth include:-

- Nature Boy, (2004) Part autobiography. ISBN 0646439510
- They Called Me The Wildman - the prison diary of Henricke Nelsen, 2008, Murdoch Books, Pier 9.ISBN 9781741960679
- Smythe's Theory of Everything, 2011, Hybrid Publishing. ISBN 9781921665523
- And So It Was, 2013, Limited edition Artist's Book of short stories and illustrations. ISBN 9780646595382
- The Colour of the Night, 2014, Hybrid Publishing. ISBN 9781925000566
- A Blank Canvas, 2018, Harbour Publishing House. ISBN 9781922134981
