= Louis Robert James =

Australian painter (1920–1996)

Louis Robert James (1920–1996) was a South Australian abstract and figurative painter in oils.

== History ==
James was the eldest of three sons of Louis Clifford James (1888 – 19 April 1948) and Doris Mary James, née Carmody, who married in 1920.

James received formal training in drawing at the South Australian School of Arts and Crafts 1934–1936. As a young man he was an amateur boxer, besides being employed as a draftsman in the South Australian Lands Department 1938–1939 before enlisting with the 2nd AIF 1940–1945.

James began painting seriously after his war experience in Europe. On his return to Adelaide he joined the Royal South Australian Society of Arts, at whose 1946 group exhibition his Wounded Soldier was noticed by critics Ivor Francis and H. E. Fuller.

He held his first one-man exhibition in John Martin's Gallery, Adelaide, in 1949, then for 15 years he travelled and exhibited in Europe, based in London. and exhibited at the Redfern Gallery, London, Von Bertouch Gallery, Newcastle, and the Bonython Gallery, Adelaide, multiple times, and many other galleries once or twice, also a similar number of group shows. He returned to Adelaide in 1964, then moved to Sydney in 1965.

He won several valuable awards, including the Sulman and Vizard-Wholohan prizes, and is represented in the National galleries of Adelaide and Sydney, and a great number of private and regional collections.
