= Anne Wallace =

Australian painter (born 1970)

- Born: Anne Wallace; 31 August 1970 (age 55); Brisbane
- Education: Queensland University of Technology
- Alma mater: St Aidan's Anglican Girls' School
- Style: figurative painter

Anne Wallace (born 31 August 1970) is an Australian painter. Her works have appeared in major exhibitions and are held in major collections.

== Early life and education ==
Wallace was born in Brisbane on 31 August 1970, growing up in suburban Kenmore. She attended St Aidan's Anglican Girls' School in Corinda, Brisbane, and then graduated from Queensland University of Technology (QUT) in 1991 or 1990 with a Bachelor of Arts (Visual Arts). Wallace was taught at QUT by "the renowned landscape painter William Robinson" whom "she credits [...] with teaching her the traditional oil painting skills on which she continues to rely." She received the Oxlades Price and Hobday and Hingston Bursary from Queensland Art Gallery (QAG) in 1990. In 1993 Wallace was awarded the Gordan Samstag International Visual Art Scholarship of $50,000 to study at the Slade School of Fine Art in London in the 1994 intake. She completed a Master of Arts (Distinction) at the Slade School of Fine Art in 1996, and won the School's Melville Nettleship Prize for Figure Drawing. Wallace completed a six-month residency at the Cité internationale des arts, Paris awarded by the Power Institute of Fine Arts, University of Sydney and the Australia Council for the Arts.

== Career ==
From 1989 to 1993, Wallace was a part-time member of the Arts Faculty at the University of Queensland.

She was awarded the Sir John Sulman Prize in 1999 by the Art Gallery of New South Wales.

Wallace has regularly exhibited since 1993 with her "long-time dealer Darren Knight Gallery in Sydney"; she now (Autumn 2020) lives in Melbourne and also exhibits with Kalli Rolfe Gallery in Melbourne.

=== Style and subject matter ===
Wallace works "primarily works in oils in a figurative style often described as contemporary realism."Wallace has regularly exhibited since 1993 with her "long-time dealer Darren Knight Gallery in Sydney"; she now (Autumn 2020) lives in Melbourne and also exhibits with Kalli Rolfe Gallery in Melbourne. The imagery of Wallace's paintings has been described as "deeply engaging, often slightly disturbing and always difficult to read", earning comparisons to Balthus, Magritte, Max Beckmann, and Vermeer. Her work has also been compared to Giorgio de Chirico. Her work is "influenced by a number of factors, including the various types of Queensland architecture she grew up with, the time period from roughly the 1920s to the 1980s, novels and films about mid-century America and music by musicians such as The Smiths, one of the most important rock bands to emerge from the British independent music scene of the 1980s. Many of the works refer to something – perhaps a poem or a line from a novel – and while it is possible to appreciate the painting without knowing the reference, knowing it does allow the viewer to appreciate the painting more fully."

Wallace "has an interest in film" and her "work has been repeatedly linked to the world of cinema and film noir still shots, despite her insistence to the contrary." "In 2000, she attempted to clarify what her paintings are about, rejecting the frequently repeated links to film and narrative that have characterised commentary on her work over the course of her career: There are at least two things I regret having said about my work. The first is that my work bears a relation to film; the second is that the pictures are like ‘unfinished narratives’ ... The subject matter is such that this kind of semi-obfuscatory treatment of it is the only possible way I have of depicting it. It is the straining towards the meaning of something which is the emotion accompanying the actual experience of some of the things I am trying to depict — it is not just something arising artificially from the artwork, but this thing precedes it, in the experience of living."

Wallace is also reportedly influenced "by literature; by writers like John Updike, Kenneth Anger (with works such as Hollywood Babylon) and James Ellroy."

Her paintings "often allude to crimes and crime scenes", for example Biltmore Hotel Flower (2019) references "the famous unsolved murder in Los Angeles in 1947 of Elizabeth Short, who became known as the Black Dahlia" and was the subject of James Ellroy's 1987 novel Black Dahlia.

=== Major works in public collections ===
In addition to private collections (including the Macquarie Bank Collection), Wallace's works "are held in many public collections, including the National Gallery of Australia, Queensland Art Gallery, Queensland University of Technology, National Gallery of Victoria, Brisbane City Art Gallery and Toowoomba Regional Art Gallery".

She Is (2001) is in the collection of the National Gallery of Australia (NGA), and was exhibited along with other of Wallace's works loaned from private collections in the NGA's exhibition 'Tales of the Unexpected: aspects of contemporary Australian art' (13 July-22 September 2002).

That was long ago was (2005) purchased by the Queensland Art Gallery / Gallery of Modern Art (QAGOMA) in 2005, and has been exhibited at the QUT Art Museum, Brisbane and the Museum of Contemporary Art, Sydney.

Biltmore Hotel Flower (2019) was purchased in 2019 by the Art Gallery of Ballarat with funds from the Joe White Bequest.

=== Career and Influences ===
In 2015 Anne Wallace was interviewed in a digital story and oral history for the State Library of Queensland's James C Sourris AM Collection. In the interview Wallace talks to Sean Sennett, owner of Brisbane's Time Off magazine about her art, her studies at the Slade in London and her upbringing.

== Exhibitions ==
=== Things visible and invisible (1998) ===
Wallace exhibited as part of the things visible and invisible at Metro Arts in Brisbane alongside artists Annie Hogan and Christopher Howlett. Works included Evening shadows creep (1998), When music dies (1998), What lonely hours (1998) and Regret (1998).

=== Recent paintings (2001) ===
Solo exhibition, Darren Knight Gallery.

=== Blur — Reality and Realism in picture making (2004) ===
Wallace exhibited as part of the 'Blur' exhibition at the Redland Art Gallery in December 2004 alongside Madeleine Kelly, Julie Reeves, Jenny Watson and Paul Wrigley. Works exhibited were: Daphne (2003-2004), Eames Chair (2004), Rear Vision (2004), and Rehab (2004).

=== Darren Knight Gallery (2005) ===
Solo exhibition at the Darren Knight Gallery in 2005 included artworks Consolation (2005), Reverie (2005), Dreaming of a song (2005), Sometimes (2005), The Lonely Nights (2005), I dream in vain (2005), When stars are bright (2005), I am once again with your (2005) and That was long ago (2005).

=== Strange Ways (2020) ===
'Strange Ways' was a major exhibition of Wallace's work at the QUT Art Museum in 2020. The exhibition featured rarely seen works from private collections along with works from institutional collections such as QAGOMA, Damage (1996), and the National Gallery of Australia, She is (2001). 'Strange Ways', which was curated by Vanessa Van Ooyen, was a touring exhibition and was to be shown at the Art Gallery of Ballarat between 28 March-21 June 2020, but did not go on public display at that venue owing to the Gallery's temporary closure owing to the COVID-19 pandemic.
