= Salvatore Zofrea =

Italo-Australian artist and painter

- Born: Salvatore Zofrea; 1946 (age 79–80); Borgia, Italy
- Education: Julian Ashton Art School, Sydney
- Known for: Painting, Drawing, Printmaker, Woodcuts
- Awards: The Sulman Prize 1977, 1979 and 1982 *Awarded title of Cavaliere (Knighthood) by the Italian Government in recognition of his contribution to art in Australia, 1995
- Patrons: italian government

Salvatore Zofrea OAM (born 1946) is an Italo-Australian artist and painter.

== Life and work ==
Zofrea was born in Borgia Italy, on the 1st January 1946, and emigrated to Australia in 1956. Zofrea studied at the Julian Ashton Art School in Sydney, and later privately with Henry V. Justelius. Having spent so much of his time in Italy at church, he first discovered his talents for art when he would attempt to replicate some of the church's statues using clay he found in nearby fields. There was also at lot of art in his area, which pushed Zofrea to try it for himself.

He often draws on literary, historical and religious sources to develop his work and has three times been awarded Australia's most prestigious prize for a subject painting, the Sulman - in 1977, 1979 and 1982. In 1981 he received the Power Bequest Grant to study in Paris for six months. In 1985 he was awarded the Churchill Scholarship to study fresco painting in Italy, and spent a year or so back home, learning more tools of the trade. His commissions include the acclaimed Sydney Morning Herald mural Justelius, the Power Studio in the Cite University, five panel mural for the State Bank of NSW, Sydney Opera House Fresco sponsored by Toshiba P/L in 1992, commissioned by the Darling Harbour Star City Casino in 1997, and a five panel mural "Celebration of Life - A Picnic at Clontarf" commissioned by the NRMA in 1998.

He was a finalist in the Archibald Prize in 2014 and 2018.

== Collections ==
Many private collections in Australia and abroad as well as some Australian university collections

- National Gallery of Australia
- National Portrait Gallery
- Art Gallery of New South Wales and other state galleries
- Museum of Modern Art, New York
- Vatican Collection
- Australian Catholic University, Australia

Some of his more notable exhibitions and artwork series include:

- Odyssey (Zofrea's first public exhibition)
- Apassionata (A suite of works based on Zofrea's own life experiences)
- Capricornia (A suite based on the experiences of the Italian migrants).
