= Rockhampton Museum of Art =

Art museum in Rockhampton, Queensland

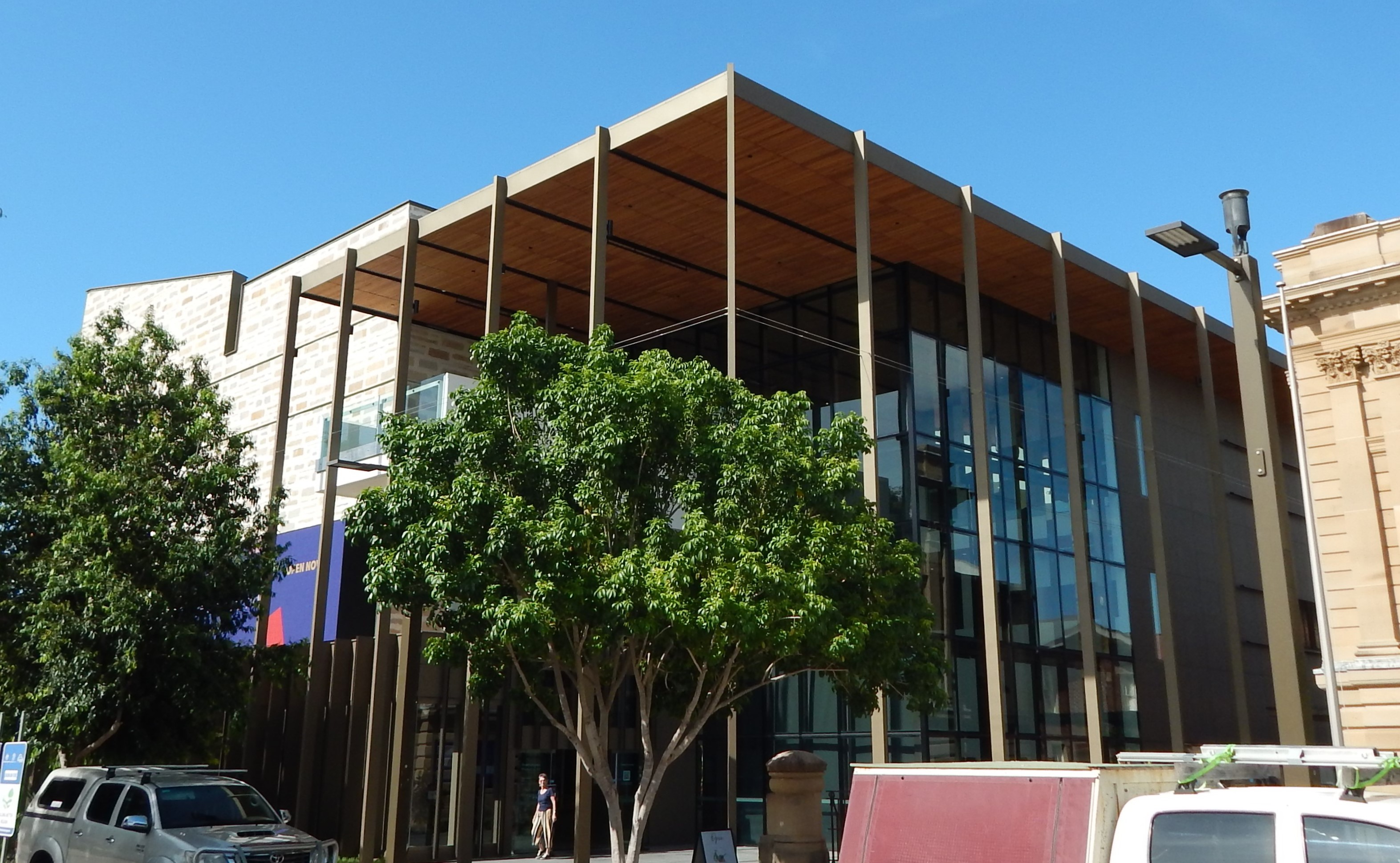
- Rockhampton Museum of Art, 2022
- Established: 25 February 2022
- Coordinates: 23.378388°S 150.515076°E
- Collection size: 3,000+
- Founder: Rex Pilbeam
- Director: Jonathan McBurnie
- Architects: Kerry and Lindsay Clare, Conrad Gargett, Brian Hooper
- Owner: Rockhampton Regional Council
- Public transit access: Kinetic Rockhampton and Young's Bus Service (Bolsover Street bus interchanges)
- Parking: on-street parking (2 hour limit)
- Website: www.rmoa.com.au

The Rockhampton Museum of Art (RMOA) is an art museum located at 212–214 Quay Street, Rockhampton City, Queensland, Australia.

It was officially opened on 25 February 2022 by Queensland premier Annastacia Palaszczuk, federal Capricornia MP Michelle Landry and Rockhampton mayor Tony Williams.

The Rockhampton Museum of Art is the largest regional art gallery in Queensland.

== Summary ==
=== Construction ===
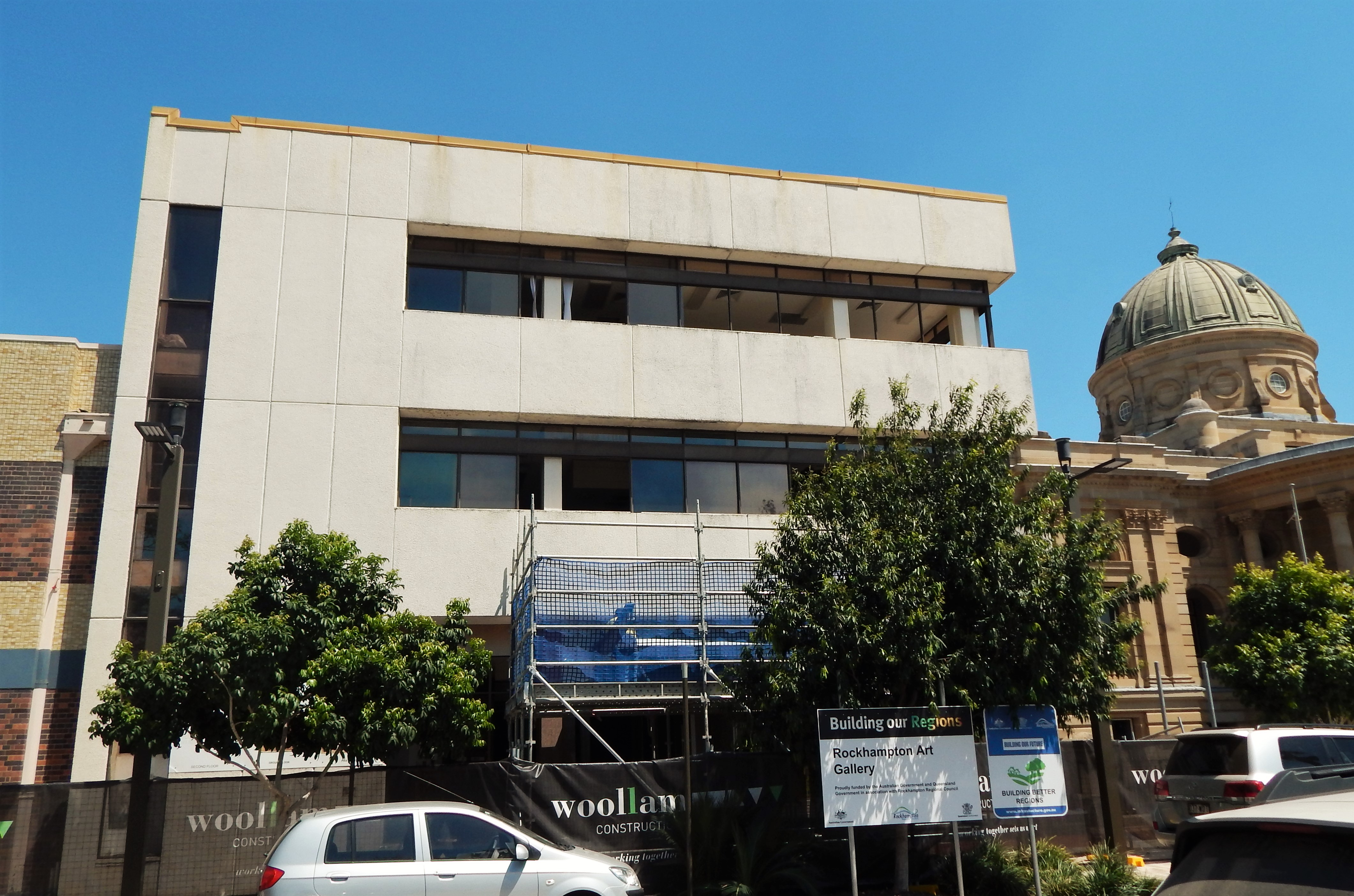
Demolition commences on one of two Quay Street buildings to make way for the Rockhampton Museum of Art, 2019

The Rockhampton Museum of Art fronts the Fitzroy River and is situated between Customs House at 208 Quay Street and the commercial building at 220 Quay Street which houses the studios of local radio station 4RO.

The large three-storey building is six times larger than its predecessor, the former Rockhampton Art Gallery at 96 Victoria Parade which was opened in 1979.

In April 2019, Rockhampton Regional Council called for tenders from four short-listed contractors after signing off on the construction of the museum. On 24 July 2019, Annastacia Palaszczuk announced local company Woollam Constructions as the successful tenderer.

Prior to its construction, the two existing commercial buildings at 212 and 214 Quay Street were demolished, including the building known as the Rockhampton Enterprise Centre. Deputy Prime Minister Michael McCormack, Capricornia MP Michelle Landry and Rockhampton Region mayor Margaret Strelow ceremonially commenced the demolition work at the site on 14 August 2019. Demolition work was carried out at the site until December 2019 when it transitioned from a demolition site to a construction site with structural work commencing in January 2020.

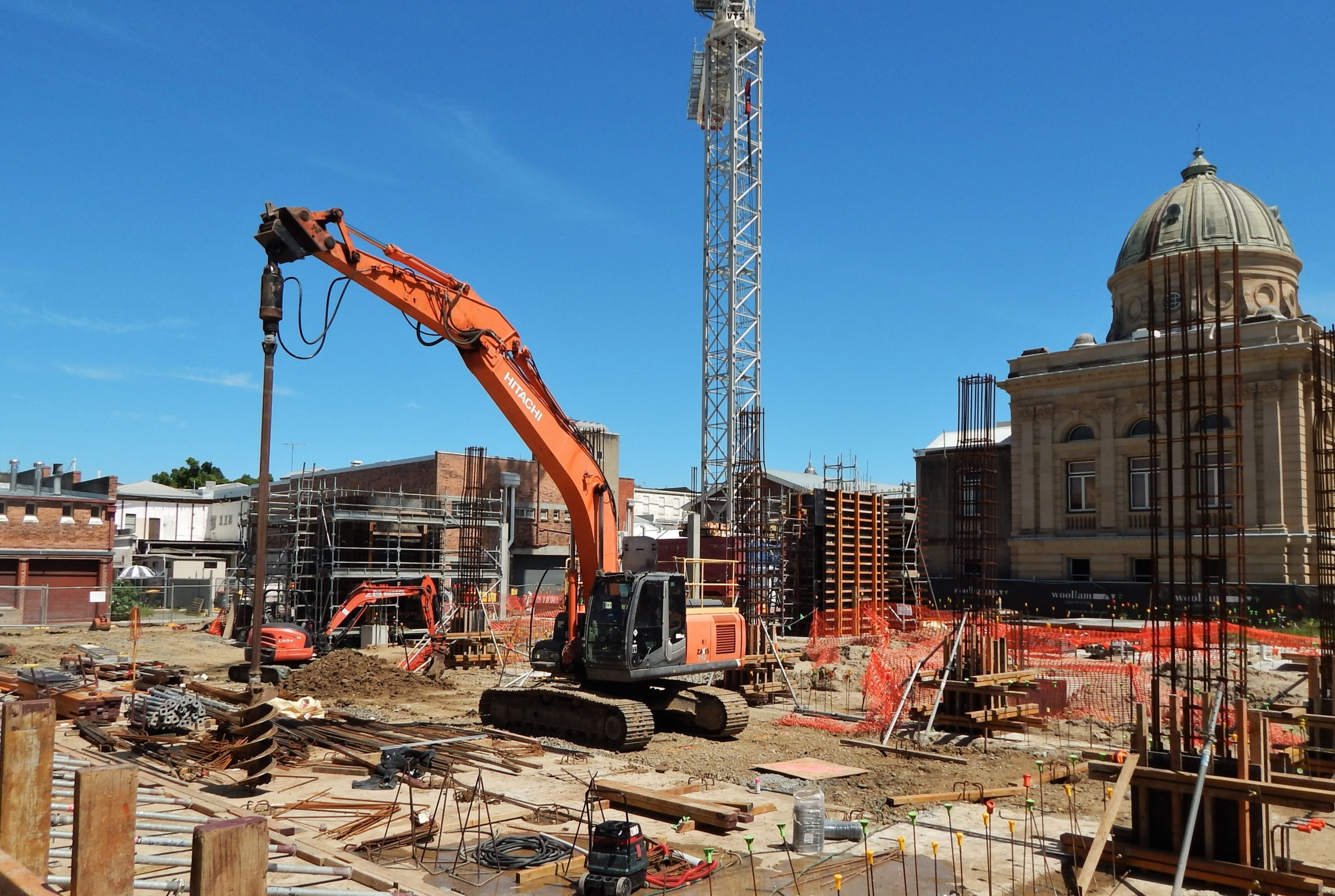
Construction of the Rockhampton Museum of Art, 2020

Construction was completed in late 2021. After the demolition of two additional buildings at 115 and 119 East Street, a pedestrian walkway was established between East Street and Quay Lane to enable access to the museum from CBD businesses located in East Street. It was hoped the façade of the East Street buildings could be retained but structural damage deemed it necessary for them to be completely demolished.

The Rockhampton Museum of Art was designed by Kerry and Lindsay Clare from Clare Design (lead design), in association with Conrad Gargett and Brian Hooper Architect.

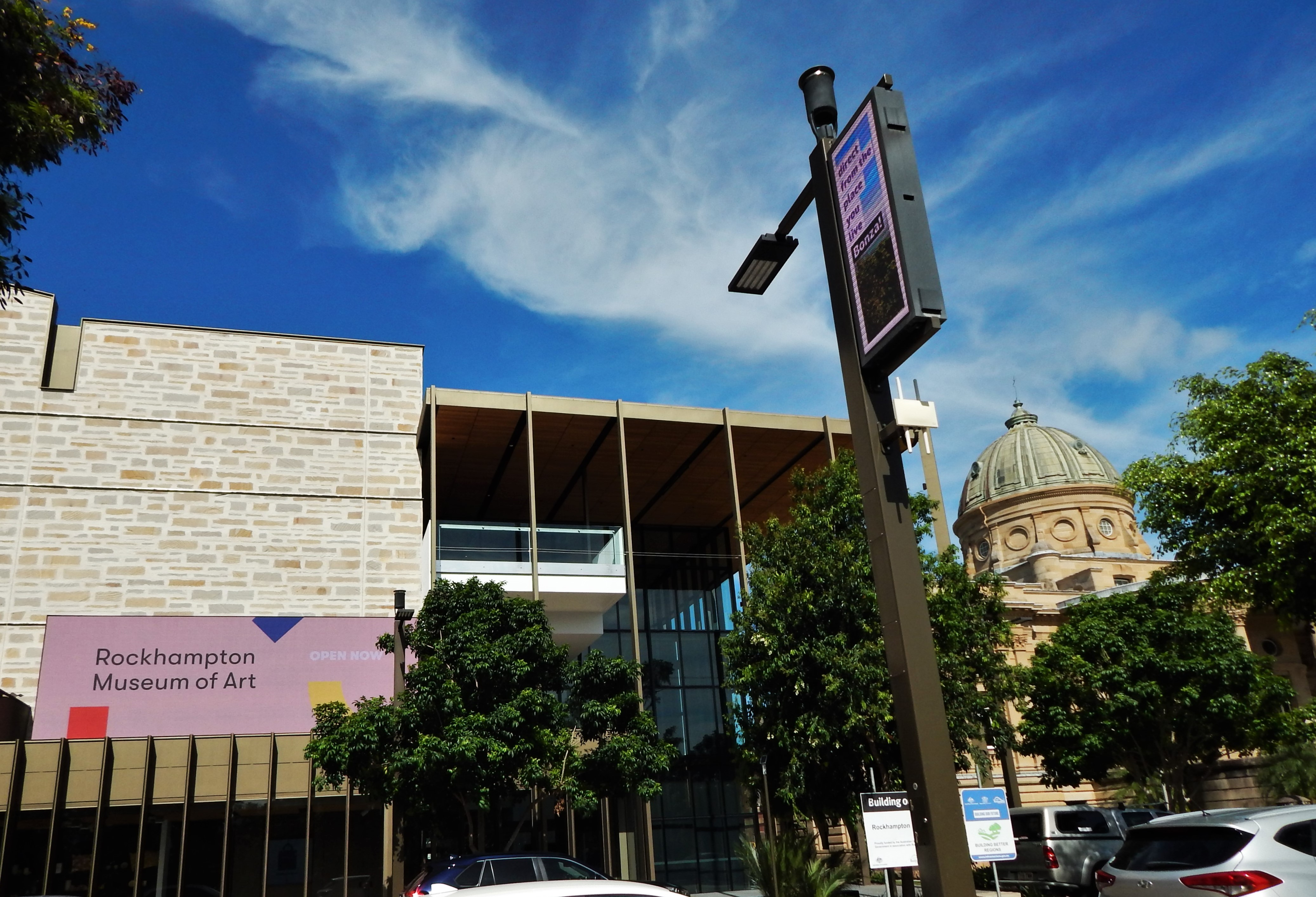
Rockhampton Museum of Art, 2022

Originally costed at $31.5 million, the $36.5 million project was jointly funded by federal, state and local governments.

The official name was announced in November 2019 following a public vote from three short-listed names – the Rex Gallery (to honour Rex Pilbeam), the Thozet Art Gallery (to honour Anthelme Thozet) and the Rockhampton Museum of Art. Other submissions included Art on Quay, Toonooba Art Gallery and Darumbal Art Space.

The museum's founding director is Jonathan McBurnie.

=== Official opening ===
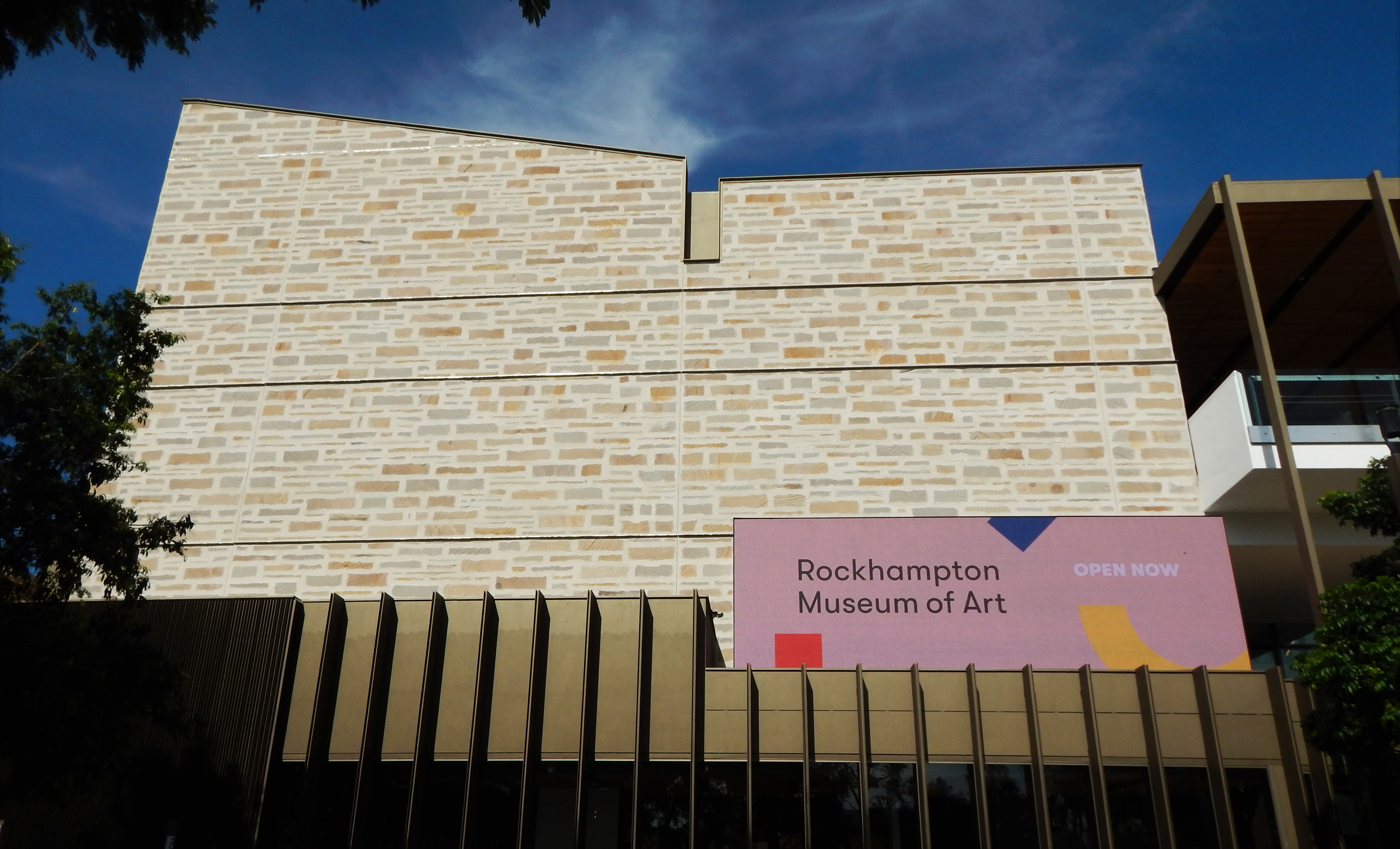
Rockhampton Museum of Art after opening to the public, 2022

The official opening of the Rockhampton Museum of Art took place on the afternoon of 25 February 2022.

Dignitaries in attendance included Queensland premier Annastacia Palaszcuk, her partner Dr Reza Adib, Queensland arts minister Leeanne Enoch, Senator Matt Canavan, federal MP Michelle Landry, state MPs Barry O'Rourke and Brittany Lauga, Darumbal elder Aunty Nicky Hatfield, former Rockhampton mayor Margaret Strelow, her husband Darryl Strelow, current Rockhampton mayor Tony Williams, and Rockhampton councillors Grant Mathers, Cherie Rutherford, Neil Fisher, Ellen Smith and Drew Wickerson.

Rod Pilbeam, the grandson of former mayor Rex Pilbeam was also in attendance.

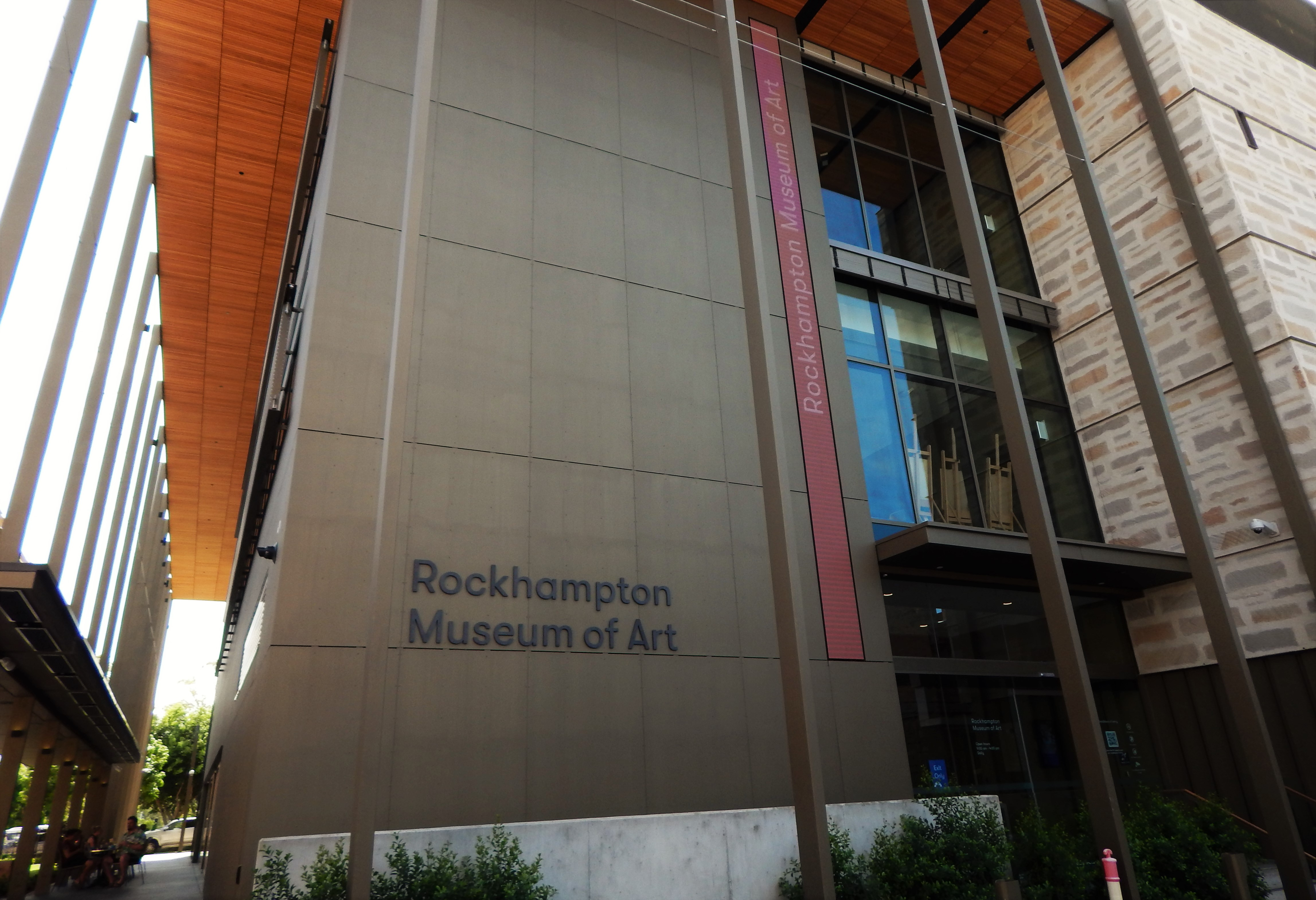
The Quay Lane entrance to the Rockhampton Museum of Art, 2022

Palaszczuk said the city now had a "multi-million dollar three-storey world-class venue" to properly display artworks from the likes of John Brack, Jeffrey Smart and Margaret Olley which were unable to be displayed in the former gallery due to its small size. She also added that with international borders now re-opened after being closed due to the COVID-19 pandemic, the museum would be "top of the list" of Rockhampton's cultural tourism experiences. She also said that the museum will help drive tourists to the Central Queensland region which will support jobs in the lead up to the 2032 Summer Olympics in Brisbane.

Williams said the Rockhampton Museum of Art would be more than just an art gallery as it will be where adults learn new skills and children learn about First Nations history. Williams said he thought Rex Pilbeam would have been "quite chuffed" if still alive to see the opening of the museum as he was the man "who planted the seed back in those early days".

The first three exhibitions to be held at the museum were the 'Welcome Home', 'Here We Meet' and 'Gold Award' exhibitions. Entertainment at the official opening was provided by local musicians Miiesha, The Huxley's and Brad Butcher.

Rod Pilbeam said he was pleased to be at the official opening in his grandfather's "reflective glory" adding that the Rockhampton Museum of Art was "a terrific achievement for this city" as it would not only house the original collection acquired by his grandfather but also encourage its growth. A 1977 portrait of Rex Pilbeam by Sir William Dargie was hung in Gallery 1, part of the 'Welcome Home' exhibition which features the original collection of artworks acquired by Pilbeam.

Beside Dargie's portrait of Pilbeam, a new portrait by Michael Zavros was unveiled at the official opening. The Zavros work is a "hyperrealistic" portrait of Margaret Strelow, former mayor of both the Rockhampton City Council and the Rockhampton Regional Council, entitled "Margaret Strelow in the new Museum of Art". Rockhampton Regional Council commissioned Zavros to paint the portrait of Strelow at a cost of $100,000 from its annual gallery acquisition funding.

Williams said it was only fitting to have a portrait of the woman who was a "driving force" behind the Rockhampton Museum of Art and said that he had no doubt that people will talk about Strelow's contribution to the city's arts and cultural heritage in the same way they do about Pilbeam's legacy. Williams said Strelow had been "a passionate, unflinching supporter" of the museum and the portrait was a "fitting tribute". After the unveiling, Strelow said she felt a "little embarrassed" by her portrait hanging beside Pilbeam who she described as a "legend" for taking a "somewhat ungainly and dusty provincial city" and giving it structure during his thirty years as mayor by sealing the roads, installing curbing and channelling, constructing a sewerage system and building the Fitzroy River Barrage while also nurturing the soul of the city.

Yarwun artist Bindi Waugh, an Iman and Bundjalung woman, was also commissioned to complete artworks for the opening exhibition.

One of the first functions held at the Rockhampton Museum of Art was a ceremony to announce the winner of the "Gold Award", a joint initiative between the RMOA, the RMOA Philanthropy Board and Rockhampton Regional Council. The Gold Award was established in 2012 as an invitational award to acquire additional contemporary artworks. It was established using a substantial bequest from Moya Gold (1928-2000), a philanthropist, as a part of her estate.

The winner of the 2022 Gold Award was Wendy Sharpe for her work entitled "Self portrait as circus banner in purple skirt 2021".

Another award conferred by the RMOA is the Bayton Award which is named for the John Bayton who was a Catholic bishop and artist who was instrumental in establishing its nationally significant art collection. This award is only open to artists, in all forms of art media, from Central Queensland.

Future events at the Rockhampton Museum of Art will include tours, workshops, artist panels, pop-up artists and yoga.

=== Early collection (1931–1979) ===
The city's first art acquisition dates back to 1931 when former North Rockhampton mayor Edward Cureton Tomkins donated an artwork which was originally thought to be a work by Sir Joshua Reynolds from around the 1780s but was later re-attributed to Lemuel Francis Abbott.

Between the 1930s and 1960s, there were various suggestions for Rockhampton to have its own art gallery.

From 1967 until the opening of the art gallery in Victoria Parade in 1979, a small art collection was displayed at Rockhampton City Hall.

=== Former Rockhampton Art Gallery (1979–2020) ===
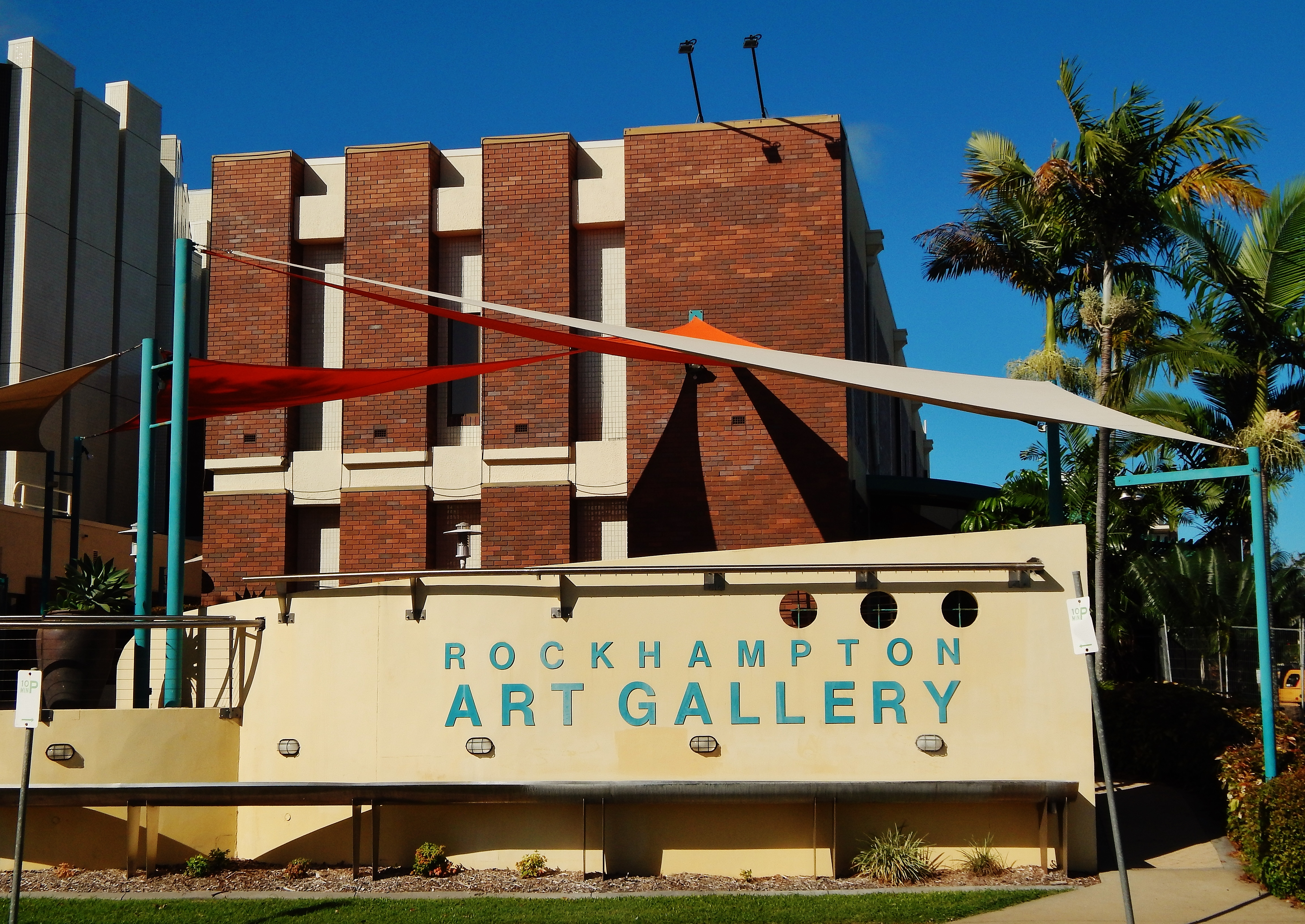
The former Rockhampton Art Gallery in Victoria Parade, 2015

The former Rockhampton Art Gallery at 62 Victoria Parade was officially opened on 6 June 1979 by Sir Zelman Cowen.

The small two-storey gallery was opened after Rockhampton mayor Rex Pilbeam had established the Rockhampton City Council Art Acquisition Committee after noticing a Commonwealth Government scheme which had been introduced in 1973. The committee consisted of Pilbeam, art gallery director Don Taylor, Bishop John Baynton and architect Neil McKendry.

The Commonwealth scheme was called The Australian Contemporary Art Acquisition Scheme, run by the Visual Arts Board of the Australia Council, and it promised a 70% subsidy to art galleries and institutions who bought the work of contemporary Australian artists. Pilbeam took advantage of the scheme and persuaded 80 local individuals and community groups to contribute $2000 each to purchase a collection of artworks valued at $350,000.

The Commonwealth Government initially refused Rockhampton City Council's bid to use the scheme in such a way but eventually an agreement was reached which saw the council acquire a collection of paintings, ceramics and sculptures worth $500,000 for just $60,000.

The collection consists of works by Sidney Nolan, Arthur Boyd, Charles Blackman, Judy Cassab, Lloyd Rees, Russell Drysdale and John Coburn. In 2016, the collection acquired by Pilbeam was valued at $14 million.

At the official opening of the Rockhampton Art Gallery in 1979, Pilbeam said: "No people have made a greater voluntary contribution to the world of art than the people of Rockhampton... I solemnly charge the future citizens of Rockhampton to maintain and advance this gallery in years to come. This is the least that we can expect of the citizens of tomorrow in return for the splendid contribution made by the citizens of today.

Since its opening, the directors of the Rockhampton Art Gallery have been Don Taylor, Dianne Heenan, Lawrence Bendle, Lisa Loader, Sue Smith, Tracy Cooper-Lavery and Bianca Acimovic. In 1990, the Rockhampton Art Gallery Trust was established which has been chaired by Fred Berry, Pamela Green, Charles Ware, Merilyn Luck and Dr Leonie Gray.

The 1979 gallery eventually became too small to house the growing permanent collection of works while also hosting various exhibitions. Therefore, a proposal was put forward for a much larger art gallery to be constructed which would enable the collection of works to be displayed permanently.

The Rockhampton Art Gallery was one of the council owned venues that was forced to temporarily close in March 2020 due to the COVID-19 pandemic. However, with the construction of the Rockhampton Museum of Art already underway, the Rockhampton Art Gallery remained closed to enable the art collection and operations to be relocated.

After its closure, the valuable art collection was carefully relocated to the new RMOA by being transported in purpose-built secure and climate controlled casing.
