= Doris Bush Nungarrayi =

Australian artist

Doris Bush Nungarrayi is an Australian Aboriginal artist (born c. 1942, in Haasts Bluff, Northern Territory) who won the 2023 Sir John Sulman Prize. She is a painter at the Aboriginal-owned Papunya Tjupi art centre in Papunya, an Indigenous Australian community northwest of Alice Springs.

Her first solo exhibition "Doris Bush Nungarrayi: This is a Love Story" opened at Damien Minton Gallery, Sydney in 2012. Her work is held in the Macquarie Bank Collection, Artbank, and the University of Western Sydney collection.

She won the 2023 Sir John Sulman Prize with her painting, Mamunya ngalyananyi (Monster coming).

== Group exhibitions ==
Group exhibitions
Exhibition	Sponsor	Location	Date
Artstage Singapore	Mossenson Galleries		2013
The Keating Speech	Damien Miinton Gallery	Sydney	2012
Desert Rhythm - Artists of Papunya Tjupi	Mossenson Galleries	Melbourne	2012
Desert Mob	Araluen Arts Centre	Alice Springs	2012
Papunya Tjupi	Marshall Arts	Adelaide	2012
Papunya Power	Art Mob Gallery	Hobart	2011
Papunya Tjupi	Mina Mina Gallery	Queensland	2011
Papunya Tjupi	Harvison Gallery	Perth	2011
Papunya Tjupi Artists	Damien Minton Gallery	Sydney	2011
UNSW International Showcase	UNSW Kensington	Sydney	2011
Kuwarritja Tjutaku Papunya Tjupinya	Chapman Gallery	Canberra	2011
Papunya Tjupi: Generations	Mossenson Galleries	Melbourne	2011
Desert Mob	Araluen Arts Centre	Alice Springs	2011
Papunya Tjupi Arts	Tandanya National Aboriginal Cultural Institute	Adelaide	2011
Papunya Tjupi Arts	ARTKelch Gallery	Germany	2011
New Prints from Papunya Tjupi Arts	Nomad Arts	Canberra and Darwin	2011
Art of Women	Randell Lane Fine Art	Perth	2010
Papunya Power	ArtMob	Hobart	2010
Desert Stories Papunya Tjupi Now	Gecko Gallery	Broome	2010
Desert Mob	Araluen Arts Centre	Alice Springs	2010
Tjukurrpa: Papunya Tjupi Arts	Mossenson Galleries	Melbourne	2010
Papunya Tjupi Arts Group Exhibition	Randell Lane Fine Art	Perth	2010
Papunya Tjupi	Honey Ant Gallery	Sydney	2009
Kalipinypa	Mossenson Galleries	Melbourne	2009
Desert Mob	Araluen Arts Centre	Alice Springs	2009
Introducing Papunya Tjupi and Ampilatawatja	Gallery Gondwana	Alice Springs	2009
Papunya Tjupi Group Show	Gecko Gallery/Broome Gecko Gallery	Broome	2009
Building Papunya Tjupi	Ivan Dougherty Gallery	Sydney	2009
We're talking about Papunya again	Art Mob	Hobart	2008
