= Bernard Ollis =

Australian artist and painter (born 1951)

Bernard Ollis OAM
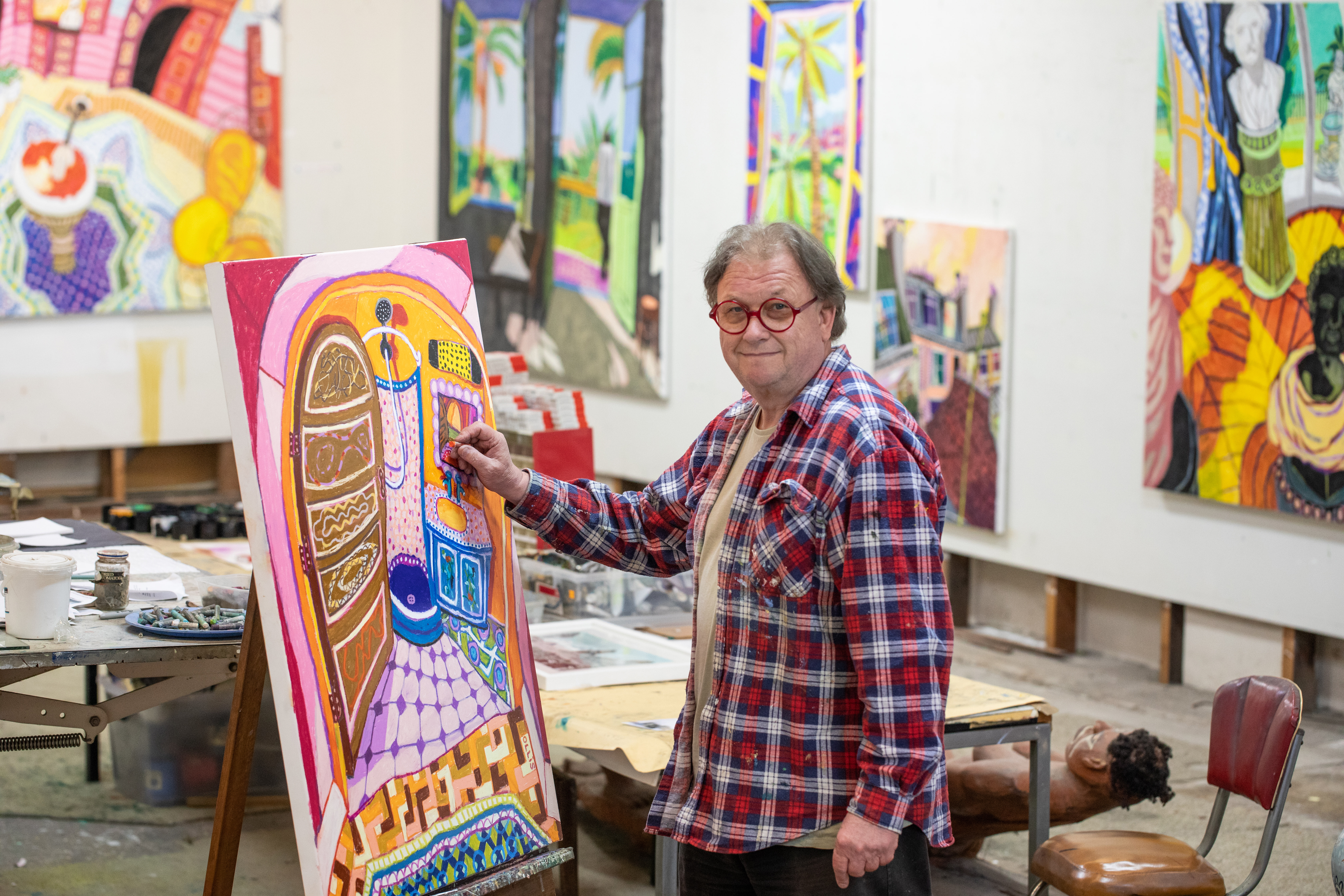
- Ollis in his studio, 2022
- Born: 25 April 1951 (age 74); Somerset, England
- Citizenship: British, Australian
- Known for: Artist
- Website: bernardollis.com

Bernard Ollis OAM (born 25 April 1951) is a British-Australian artist, painter and advocate for arts education. He lives and works in Sydney and Paris.

He has an extensive academic and professional portfolio across numerous arts institutions within Australia and Europe. Ollis is the former Director of the National Art School, Sydney.

Ollis is the longest serving director of the National Art School; his tenure spanned over 11 years (1997 – 2008). He has held over 80 solo exhibitions across Australia, New Zealand, Asia, Germany, France and the UK.

== Early life and education ==
Ollis was born on 25 April 1951 and raised in Bath, Somerset, England. Growing up, Ollis lived in numerous council houses with his family. He was the first child in his family to attend university.

As a child, Ollis attended Bath Art Secondary School (1962 – 1967), where he developed his interest and talent in art.

From 1969 – 1973, he attended Cardiff College of Art & Design, Wales, after winning a scholarship in 1963. He graduated with a diploma and B.A. Hons. in Fine Art. Following this, he won a three-year bursary to attend the prestigious Royal College of Art, London, in 1973.

His tutors at the RCA included various internationally acclaimed artists, such as Sir Peter Blake, Howard Hodgkin, R.B. Kitaj and David Hockney, and guest lecturers include Francis Bacon and Cy Twombly.

It was there that he attained his Master of Art (Painting), in 1976.

== Career ==
In 1976, Ollis moved to Darwin, Australia; to lecture at Charles Darwin University (then named Darwin Community College).

Ollis has held over 60 solo exhibitions since 1972 in Australia, New Zealand, and London, and has participated in group exhibitions throughout Australia, Europe, and Asia. Ollis undertook a residency at the Cite Internationale des Arts, Paris in 1975 and in 2008 he underwent a Residency as the guest of the Australian Ambassador to Egypt, Dr Bob Bowker. Subsequent residencies include the Obracadobra artist residency in Oaxaca City, Mexico, with Mawson's Huts Foundation to Antarctica in 2014, and an international artist residency at Funxing-Ginger Art Space, Zhouzhuang, Jiangsu, China in 2015.

Ollis received the 1976 John Minton International Painting Prize, the 1977 Sir Frederick Richards’ Travelling Scholarship (UK), an Australia Council Visual Arts Board Grant (1984), and the Conrad Jupiters Award in 2005 (Gold Coast City Art Gallery QLD). Ollis's work is currently held in public collections in Australia and the United Kingdom, including the Royal College of Art London, National Gallery of Australia, Parliament House, Canberra, and the State Galleries of Queensland, Victoria and Northern Territory. His partner is artist Wendy Sharpe.

== Residencies and scholarships ==
During his studies at the RCA, Ollis was awarded a four-month residency at the Cite Internationale des Arts in 1975. It was this experience that sparked a lifelong relationship with France, and Paris is frequently referenced in Ollis' work.

He also received a scholarship from the Commonwealth Institute, London, to undertake a residency with the Maltese Studio International as part of the Youth Arts Festival, Malta in 1975.

== Recognition and awards ==
- 2023 Medal of the Order of Australia (OAM) for services to visual art and education
- 2015 Artist Residency in Zhouzhang, China
- 2014 Mawson's Hut Foundation artist-in-residence, Antarctica voyage
- 2008 Australian Embassy, Artist-in-Residence Studio, Cairo Egypt
- 2005 Conrad Jupiter Art Prize Gold Coast City Art Gallery Queensland
- 2000 Olympic Arts Festival 1992 Selected by Melbourne Theatre Company for season's brochure
- 1989 Selected for Sydney Children's Choir catalogue
- 1988 Heritage Arts Festival Award, Queensland
- 1984 Visual Arts Board Australia, Council Grant
- 1983 Commissioned series of paintings for Napoleon Brandy Advertising Campaign
- 1982 Gold Coast City Art Awards, Queensland
- 1977 Sir Fredrick Richards's Travelling Scholarship (drawing), UK
- 1976 John Minton International Painting Prize, London UK
- 1975 Artist-in-residence Maltese Studio International Youth Arts Festival British representative
- 1975 Artist-in-residence Paris Studio Cité internationale des arts

== Selected solo exhibitions ==
- 2019 Departures, Aarwun, Canberra
- 2019 The Traveller, Mitchell Fine Art Gallery, Brisbane
- 2018 Bernard Ollis, Anala Art Advisory, Glenbrook, Blue Mountains
- 2018 Being There, Harvey Galleries, Mosman & Seaforth, Sydney
- 2018 Traveler's Tales: Paris and Morocco, Linton & Kay Galleries, Perth
- 2017 Paris and Other Stories, Aarwun Galleries, Canberra
- 2017 Observations, Mitchell Fine Art, Brisbane (May)
- 2017 Favourite Places, Harvey Galleries Seaforth and Mosman, Sydney
- 2016 Run Ya Artspace Linyi China
- 2016 Cultural Exchange of Australia and China, Linyi Arts Centre Shandong
- 2016 Storytelling about China – Shanghai Cultural Centre & Art Gallery China
- 2016 Open Studio – Travel Paintings, Linton and Kay Galleries, Perth WA
- 2016 Travels to Paris, Trevor Victor Harvey Gallery, Seaforth, Sydney NSW
- 2015 Brisbane and Beyond, Mitchell Fine Art, Brisbane, Queensland
- 2015 Bernard Ollis: 54 Works at Michael Reid Gallery, Berlin, Germany
- 2015 Observations of Paris, NG Gallery, Sydney
- 2015 Theatre of Life, Buratti Fine Art, Perth, WA
- 2015 Antarctica- Shackleton, The Australian National Maritime Museum, Sydney
- 2014 Bernard Ollis, Kenthurst Galleries, NSW 2014 Le Regard de deux Australiens, L’Espace Beaujon, Paris, France
- 2014 Traveller's Tales, Tweed River Regional Gallery, NSW
- 2013 A Town Like Paris, Muk Muk Fine Art, travelling show to Alice Springs, Darwin, Brisbane
- 2013 Paris Work, Buratti Fine Art, Perth 2012 – 13 Modern Living: Bernard Ollis. A survey of the work of Bernard Ollis, Manly Art Gallery and Museum, Sydney
- 2012 Paris Considered, NG Art Gallery, Sydney 2012 Parisian Reflections, Letham Galleries, Auckland, NZ
- 2011 Paris Revisited, NG Art Gallery, Sydney
- 2011 Major Works, Buratti Fine Art, Perth
- 2010 Italy 19Karen Contemporary Artspace Gold Coast, Queensland
- 2009 The Grand Tour, United Galleries Perth WA
- 2009 Journeys through Italy and Egypt, NG Art Sydney NSW 2008 Urban Myth, United Galleries Perth WA
- 2008 Incognito NG Art, Chippendale Sydney NSW
- 2006 The St Peters Suite Michael Nagy Fine Art, Sydney NSW
- 2002 Stella Downer Galleries, Sydney NSW
- 2001 Michael Nagy Fine Art, Sydney NSW
- 2000 Michael Nagy Fine Art, Sydney NSW
- 1998 Mary Place Gallery, Sydney NSW
- 1998 Sydney Theatre Company, Sydney NSW
- 1997 Hot Bath Gallery, Bath UK
- 1996 Australian Galleries, Melbourne Victoria
- 1994 Bendigo Art Gallery, Victoria
- 1993 Botanical Gallery, South Yarra Victoria
- 1992 Retrospective Paintings and Pastels Macquarie Gallery, Sydney NSW
- 1991 Powell Street Gallery, South Yarra Victoria 1990 Macquarie Gallery, Sydney NSW
- 1989 Macquarie Gallery, Sydney NSW
- 1988 Macquarie Gallery, Sydney NSW
- 1998 Roz McAllen Gallery, Brisbane Queensland
- 1987 Macquarie Gallery, Sydney NSW Powell Street Gallery, South Yarra Victoria
- 1984–1986 Visual Arts Board, “Bernard Ollis” The Australian Tour; exhibited at:
  - Under croft Gallery for the Perth Festival
  - University of Western Australia
  - Hawthorn City Art Gallery, Victoria
  - Warrnambool Art Gallery, Victoria
  - Ararat Gallery, Victoria
  - Mildura Arts Centre, Victoria
  - Shepparton Regional Art Gallery, Victoria
  - Muswellbrook Art Gallery, NSW
  - Bathurst Regional Gallery, NSW
  - Orange Art Gallery, NSW
  - Benalla Art Gallery Victoria
  - Wagga Wagga Art Gallery, NSW
  - Bendigo Art Gallery Victoria (extended survey exhibition)
- 1984 Macquarie Gallery, Sydney NSW
- 1982 Macquarie Gallery, Sydney NSW
- 1981 Macquarie Gallery, Sydney NSW
- 1978 Warehouse Galleries, South Melbourne Victoria
- 1976 The Africa Centre Covent Garden, London UK
- 1976 The Royal Commonwealth Society, London UK
- 1974–1975 Commonwealth Institute Gallery, London UK
- 1972–1973 College of Art Gallery, Cardiff Wales

== Selected group exhibitions ==
- 2018 'Nature and Life: Images from our Souls', Bayside Arts Festival, Sydney
- 2017 'Salon des Refuses', S.H. Ervin, Sydney
- 2017 'Bernard Ollis & Wendy Sharpe', Firestation Print Studio, Melbourne
- 2016 Blue Mountains Cultural Centre, NSW
- 2015 'Three Australians', Gallery 12, Auckland NZ
- 2015 'New Romantics (with Wendy Sharpe and Johnny Romeo)', Penny Contemporary Gallery, Hobart, Tasmania
- 2015 'Private Lives: Collections', S.H. Ervin Gallery, Sydney
- 2011 'Dobell Prize', Art Gallery of New South Wales, Sydney
- 2011 I'N[TWO]ART', Maitland Regional Art Gallery touring exhibition
- 2010 'Salon des Refuses', S.H. Ervin Gallery, Sydney
- 2010 ‘Tales from the City’, Two person exhibition with Wendy Sharpe, Orange Regional Art Gallery
- 2009 ‘Every Dog has its Day’, Letham Gallery Auckland NZ
- 2008 United Galleries, Perth WA
- 2008 Contemporary Drawing London University of the Arts Wimbledon Art Col, England
- 2008 ‘Vernissage’ Oxford Street Gallery, Melbourne Victoria
- 2008 ‘Drawcard’ National Art School Gallery, Sydney New South Wales
- 2007 ‘Fragile Planet’ NG Art Gallery, Sydney New South Wales
- 2007 ‘Salon des Refuses’ SH Ervin Gallery, New South Wales
- 2007 SCEGGS Redlands Art Prize
- 2007 Mosman Art Prize
- 2007 ‘There is no place like home’ NG Art Gallery, Sydney New South Wales
- 2006 Hong Ik University Gallery, Seoul South Korea
- 2005 ‘Drawcard’ Cell Block Theatre National Art School, Sydney New South Wales
- 2005 ‘Dog Trumpet’ Michael Nagy Gallery, Sydney New South Wales
- 2005 ‘Drawing the Line’ Cell Block Theatre National Art School (academic staff exhibition)
- 2005 Art Space, Bendigo Victoria
- 2005 Lake Macquarie Invitation Prize, University Gallery Sydney NSW

== Institutional lecturer ==
- 1998–2009 Director National Art School (Sydney)
- 1997–1998 Head of Studies National Art School (Sydney)
- 1996–1997 Head of Painting Department National Art School (Sydney)
- 1994–1996 Senior Lecturer/Head of Fine Art La Trobe University (Victoria)
- 1982–1994 Head of Painting La Trobe University (Victoria)
- 1982 Acting Head of Visual Art Department Darwin Community College (University Northern Territory)
- 1978–1982 Head of Painting, Drawing and Sculpture Section Darwin Community College (University Northern Territory)
- 1977–1978 Lecturer Fine Art Darwin Community College (University Northern Territory)
- 1974–1976 Visiting Lecturer Various British Art Schools

== Collections ==
Ollis' work is held by many galleries, including:

- National Gallery of Australia, Canberra
- National Gallery of Victoria, Melbourne
- Queensland Art Gallery, Brisbane
- Museum and Art Gallery of the Northern Territory
- The Royal College of Art London, UK
- Parliament House, Canberra
- The Commonwealth Institute, London, UK
- Art Bank, Sydney
- Royal Melbourne Institute of Technology, Victoria
- La Trobe University, Melbourne
- Darwin University, Northern Territory
- McGregor Collection University of Southern Queensland, Toowoomba
- Gold Coast City Art Gallery, Surfers Paradise, Queensland
- Herald Sun Art Collection, Melbourne
- Bathurst Arts Centre, Bathurst
- New England Regional Art Museum, Armidale
- Orange Regional Art Gallery, Orange
- Grafton Regional Gallery, Grafton
- Ballarat Art Gallery and Museum, Ballarat
- Bendigo Art Gallery, Bendigo

== Personal life ==
Presently, Ollis works in a large studio warehouse in inner Sydney, and in an apartment/studio in Montmartre, Paris, which he owns with his partner, artist Wendy Sharpe. Australia remains his home-base.

He has three daughters; Myfanwy, Madeline and Vanessa.
