= Wendy Sharpe =

Australian artist (born 1960)

Wendy Sharpe AM FRSN
- Born: 24 February 1960 (age 66); Sydney, Australia
- Known for: Artist
- Awards: Archibald Prize, Sulman Prize, Portia Geach Memorial Award, The Gold Award, The Calleen Award, The Adelaide Perry Drawing Award
- Website: wendysharpe.com

Wendy Sharpe AM FRSN (born 24 February 1960) is an Australian artist who lives and works in Sydney and Paris. She has had many solo exhibitions nationally and internationally, been awarded many national awards and artist residencies for her work, and was an official Australian war artist to East Timor in 1999–2000.

== Early life and education ==
Wendy Sharpe was born on 24 February 1960 in Sydney, Australia. She is the only child of British parents; her father is the writer and historian Alan Sharpe.

She spent her early years in the Northern Beaches in Sydney, and from 1978 and 1979 she studied at Seaforth Technical College. She received a Graduate Diploma of Professional Art from the City Art Institute in Sydney in 1984, and a master's degree from the College of Fine Arts, University of New South Wales in 1995.

== Career ==
Sharpe taught part-time at art schools for many years; including a position at the National Art School, Sydney.

She works in oil paint creating large scale portrait and figurative works that depict real people as well as imagined elements. She also creates commissioned murals.

Chris Saines, director of Queensland Gallery of Modern Art said Sharpe's work explores a "...constant curiosity about the world, the outer limits of the human imagination, and the part played by art history in nourishing them both. She is, first and foremost, an extraordinarily accomplished painter who makes it all look so easy, when it never is".

Saines awarded her the prestigious Gold Award in 2022.

=== Portraits ===
She has painted portraits of many well-known figures in the Australian arts industry, including Ash Flanders (finalist in the Archibald Prize, 2014), Venus Vamp (finalist in the Archibald prize, 2013), Magda Szubanski (finalist in the Archibald prize, 2020), Elena Kats – Chernin (now in the permanent collection of the National Portrait Gallery, Canberra, 2017).

=== Murals ===
Sharpe has created a number of temporary murals and major wall paintings in museums and galleries, such as; Maitland Regional Gallery, Mosman Art Gallery, Lake Macquarie Museum of Art and Culture and The Yellow House, Potts Point.

The City of Sydney council commissioned Sharpe in 1998 to paint an Olympic pool-sized mural on the life of Australian swimmer, actress and vaudeville performer, Annette Kellerman. It is a series of eight paintings hung suspended along one side of the pool, permanently displayed in the Cook + Phillip Aquatic Centre, Sydney.

In 2020, Sharpe was commissioned by the Inner West Council’s Perfect Match program, for their 100th mural. Titled ‘Women’s Empowerment Mural’, it is on the corner of Church and Federation Street, Newtown, painted on the wall surrounding the home of Ewan Samway and his partner Matt Vagulans.

In 2021, she painted a forty-metre ephemeral mural, ‘Vu iz dos gesele?/Where is the little street?’, at Sydney Jewish Museum. The mural depicted her recent family research trip to Ukraine. It included a portrait of her grandmother and poetic imagery about time passing. Government imposed COVID-19 restrictions at the time meant that the mural was never to open to the public. A documentary on the mural ‘Site Unseen’ was later shown on ABC TV’s Compass program.

=== Performance ===
Triptico, Collaboration with Paulina Quinteros and Elena Kats-Chernin (Costumes and design, and live painting), ARA Darling Quarter Theatre, Darling Harbour, Sydney

Sharpe has created works through residencies with Circus Oz, Sydney Dance Company and Opera Australia and drawn burlesque performers and drag queens from the audience view and backstage. She has also drawn live on stage at various art spaces.

Sharpe was commissioned by Arts Centre Melbourne in 2008–2009 to make a series of drawings to commemorate Stravinsky’s ‘Firebird and Petruska’, with choreographer Graeme Murphy.

=== Official war artist ===
In 1999, Sharpe was appointed official war artist during the Australian military role in East Timor, commissioned by the Australian War Memorial, Canberra. She was the first female artist to be appointed in this role since World War II.

Per the Australian War Memorial (AWM) website:

Sharpe commenced duty in Darwin, where she attended briefing sessions and recorded the everyday activities of life in the barracks. On 12 December, she departed for East Timor on HMAS 'Jervis Bay'. Attached to the Army History Unit, she was assigned a military escort and wore a non-combatant uniform with the insignia "Australian Official Artist". Sharpe spent three weeks sketching the local people and Australian peacekeepers, before returning to Sydney to complete major works based on her observations.

After returning from East Timor, Sharpe's paintings and drawings made on duty were added to the AWM's collection.

== Exhibitions ==
Sharpe has exhibited work regularly since the mid-1980s throughout Australia; in commercial galleries, state museums, regional galleries and art spaces. She has also had solo exhibitions in the UK, France, China, Germany. As of 2023 she had had over 70 solo exhibitions nationally and internationally.

A major retrospective of her work, ’The Imagined Life’ was held at S. H. Ervin Gallery, The National Trust, Sydney, in 2011.

In 2024, she held a major exhibition titled Spellbound at the Art Gallery of New South Wales.

== International residencies and scholarships ==
Though based in Sydney, Sharpe spends part of every year in an artist studio/apartment in Paris. Sharpe has travelled extensively, and has been a recipient of many international artist residencies.

She was awarded the Marten Bequest Travelling Scholarship in 1986, and a residency at the Cité Internationale des Arts in Paris in 1987 (and again in 2007). These residencies were awarded through the Art Gallery of NSW.

In 2008, Sharpe was artist in residence at the Australian Embassy residence in Cairo, Egypt. She was an official guest of the Australian Ambassador, Robert Bowker. Wendy Sharpe has made two trips to Antarctica as an artist in residence. First in 2012, aboard the scientific vessel, the Aurora Australis, for six weeks. The ship travelled from Hobart to Cape Denison, Antarctica. She produced work to commemorate the centenary voyage of Australian explorer Douglas Mawson, in association with the Australian Antarctic Division. The work produced on board the ship was later shown in a major exhibition at the Australian National Maritime Museum, Sydney; all money raised was donated to Mawson's Hut Foundation.

Her second residency to Antarctica travelled from Argentina in 2014, with Chimu Adventures. The work produced was shown in ‘Paintings for Antarctica’, an exhibition at the Australian National Maritime Museum. In 2019, Sharpe and Ollis joined Chimu Adventures together aboard the Ocean Atlantic, on a trip to Svalbard in the arctic.

In 2014, Sharpe had a residency at Obracadobra, in Oaxaca, Mexico.

Sharpe has made several professional trips to China. In 2015, she was artist in residence at Funxing-Ginger Art Space, Zhouzhuang, Jiangsu. The work she made included a series about the Kunqu Opera.

Returning to China in 2016, she had exhibitions at: Linyi Contemporary Art Centre China, Qinghua Centre, 6th Shandong Cultural Industries Fair Jinan, ‘China Stories’ Shanghai Cultural Centre and Art Gallery Shanghai China.

Her residencies in Sydney include Taronga Zoo (2011), and at State Library of NSW (2017–2018), during renovations and major building work. The library acquired a collection of Sharpe's folding book works.

== Philanthropic organisations and fundraising ==
Sharpe has worked with a number of different philanthropic organisations, creating work for fundraising exhibitions and events.

Through the Asylum Seeker Centre, Sydney, Sharpe drew 39 portraits of refugees and asylum seekers for her exhibition Seeking Humanity – Portraits of Asylum Seekers. These portraits were all drawn from life in pastel, and 100% of sales were donated to the centre. The exhibition toured from 2014 - 2015 from The Muse Gallery - Ultimo TAFE (Sydney), Belconnen Arts Centre (Canberra), Penrith Regional Gallery (Sydney) and Mary McKillop Place Museum (North Sydney). An ABC TV documentary was made about the exhibition (see Television). In 2015 she became patron of the Asylum Seeker Centre, Sydney.

In 2019, she travelled to Ethiopia with Catherine Hamlin Fistula Foundation. She drew patients, students and staff of the Addis Adaba Fistula Hospital, Desta Mender Rehabilitation and Reintegration Centre, and regional clinics. The completed drawings were exhibited at Macquarie Space Gallery in Sydney, March 2020, with all proceeds going to the foundation.

To assist Lou's Place Daytime Women's Refuge, Sydney; Sharpe created a fundraising exhibition titled Her Shoes. This was shown at Juniper Hall in Paddington, with assistance from Kim Chandler-MacDonald. There were 52 pastel drawings of shoes to represent how domestic violence can affect women of all ages and backgrounds.

== Media appearances ==
Sharpe has appeared in numerous in Australian television programs, radio interviews, and podcasts.

=== Sitting for Wendy ===
In 2015, Sharpe drew 39 portraits of asylum seekers who shared their stories of survival and integration. Filmed for the ABC TV documentary series Compass, the program followed the lives of three asylum seekers. The documentary includes footage of Sharpe as she drew each portrait, completed in a 2-3 hour sitting.

Sharpe's subjects talked to her about themselves, their homes, careers, where they came from and the families they've left behind.

=== Life Drawing Live ===
Life Drawing Live (2020), was Australia's first live-televised life drawing class. Sharpe and Maryanne Coutts guided a group of Australian celebrities through a series of drawing exercises, using nude models. The show was hosted by Rove McManus on SBS Television.

=== Space 22 ===
Space 22 was a six-part documentary series exploring the impact of art and creativity on mental health, hosted by Natalie Bassingthwaighte. Sharpe was an art expert in episodes 3 and 4. Space 22 follows seven participants, each with their own lived experience of mental ill-health and trauma. They were directed through a series of creative exercises by Sharpe and other hosts, each exercise designed to use art as a tool to improve their mental wellbeing.

=== Site Unseen ===
Sharpe's mural, ‘Vu iz dos gesele?/Where is the little street?’, was the subject of an ABC TV documentary, Site Unseen, in the Compas series, at Sydney Jewish Museum in 2021. The half-hour documentary follows the mural's development during COVID-19 lockdowns; from beginning sketches to the final work. The subject of the mural was based on imagery from a recent trip to Ukraine with her cousin, Ruth Fishman, to research their family history. Sharpe's paternal family originally came from Kamianets-Podilskyi, but fled the pogroms to East London around 1900. Made by Joshua Marks, Judy Menczel, and Karly Marks, it aired on ABC TV on 24 April 2022.

Sharpe has also appeared in a number of documentaries, including:

- An interview with Jane Hutcheon, One Plus One, on ABC TV in 2016
- Numerous documentaries about the Archibald Prize; ‘The Archibald’, a 7-part documentary by Foxtel Media made in 2017, and ‘Finding the Archibald’, a 3-part ABC TV series that aired May 2021.

Sharpe has been a guest on many radio interviews and podcasts about her work, including Talking with Painters with Maria Stoljar (podcast) in 2020; Conversations with Sarah Kanowski in 2022; and TEDTalk: Asylum Seeker Portrait Project, at the University of NSW, on 22 September 2018.

== Recognition, honours, and awards ==
Sharpe was appointed as a member of the council of the Australian War Memorial from 25 May 2005 (for a three-year appointment), and was reappointed twice until her retirement on 30 June 2013.

Between 2012 and 2013, Sharpe was on the ANZAC Centenary Advisory Arts Committee with the Australian Government.

In 2018, Sharpe was elected as a fellow of the Royal Society of New South Wales. She was also awarded Fellowship of the National Art School, Sydney. She is currently a member of the Board of Directors of the National Art School, appointed in 2022.

Sharpe was appointed as a Member of the Order of Australia in the 2023 King's Birthday Honours for "significant service to the visual arts, and to the community".

Sharpe has won many awards, including:

- 1986: Sulman Prize, for Black Sun – Morning and Night, awarded by Albert Tucker
- 1995: Portia Geach Memorial Award twice in 1995 with Self Portrait with Students – After Adélaïde Labille-Guiard
- 1996: Archibald Prize, for Self Portrait – as Diana of Erskineville
- 2003: Archibald Prize, for Self Portrait with Teacup and Burning Paintings
- 2014: Adelaide Perry Drawing Prize, for Self Portrait with Imaginary Friend

She has also been a finalist eight times in the Archibald Prize, and 12 times for the Sulman Prize (more than any other artist).

In 2022, she won the Gold Award at Rockhampton Museum of Art, judged by Chris Saines.

== Personal life ==
Sharpe works in a large warehouse studio in inner Sydney, and in an apartment/artist studio in Montmartre, Paris, which she owns with her partner, artist Bernard Ollis.

== Publications ==
- 2024 Wendy Sharpe, 'Many Lives' by Elizabeth Fortescue, with essays by Scott Bevan, John Mcdonald, Justin Paton, Anne Ryan and Stephanie Wood. Published by Wakefield Press
- 2022 Alchemy: Art and Poetry, in collaboration with Kate Forsyth, Published by Upswell Publishing
- 2021 Borderless: A transnational anthology of feminist poetry, Cover Edited Saba Vasefi, Melinda Smith and Yvette Holt, Published by Recent Work Press
- 2020 Book Cover & 20 Drawings for ‘Postcards from Tomorrow’, edited and published by Kim Chandler McDonald
- 2012 Jensen, David. ‘Wendy Sharpe’s Antarctica’, Published by Mawson's Huts Foundation
- 2005 Bevan, Scott. 'Battle Lines: Australian Artists at War', Published by Random House Australia
- 1992 Dysart, Dinah. Paroissien, Leon. ‘Eroticism – Images of Sexuality in Australian Art’, Published by Craftsman House

== Collections ==
Sharpe’s work is held in major collections throughout Australia in state galleries, regional galleries, and other institutions, such as:

- Art Gallery of New South Wales, Sydney
- Arts Centre Melbourne
- Adelaide Perry Collection, Croydon, NSW
- Australian National Maritime Museum, NSW
- Australian War Memorial, Canberra, ACT
- ANZAC Memorial, Sydney, NSW
- National Portrait Gallery, ACT
- Rockhampton Museum of Art, QLD
- State Library of NSW
- State Library of Queensland
- Sydney Jewish Museum, NSW
