= Keith Looby =

Australian artist (born 1940)

Keith Looby (born 1940 in Sydney, Australia), is an Australian artist who won the Archibald Prize in 1984 with a portrait of Max Gillies.

== Early life and education ==
Looby was raised in the Sydney suburbs of Newtown and Bondi. He studied at East Sydney Technical College (now The National Art School) from 1955 to 1959, where his teachers included John Passmore and he soon became part of the Sydney Push. He travelled overseas in 1960 and lived in Italy and London until 1967. In 1964, he held his first solo exhibition at the Carpini Gallery, Rome. An elaborate pencil drawing was exhibited at the Royal Academy, London in the 1960s.

== Australian history and Suburbs of the Sacred ==
Looby produced two books of drawings and illustrations on the history of Australia: The History of Australia in 1976, with poet David Campbell, representing the history of Australia up to the arrival of the English, with songs and poems inspired by the drawings and by Aboriginal myths and rock engravings of the Sydney Hawkesbury area; and Black and white history of Australia in 1979, in which he interprets aspects of Australian history, beginning with Indigenous Australia before European settlement, and the subsequent effects of settlement on Aboriginal Australia, among other episodes of foundational mythology, Ned Kelly, The Goldfields, The Bush etc.

In 1988, Australian political activist, socialist historian and cultural commentator Humphrey McQueen wrote Suburbs of the Sacred, Transforming Australian Beliefs and Values, an "examination of Australian suburban culture through the artwork of Keith Looby".

== Selected exhibition history ==
Looby commercially exhibited with the Ray Hughes Gallery in Brisbane and then in Sydney from the mid-1970s to the early 2000s. His painting Resurrection (1964) was exhibited in the historical retrospective Federation: Australian art and society 1901-2001, curated by John McDonald at the National Gallery of Australia, the afterparty of which resulted in the ending of Looby's "28 year marriage" with Hughes.

In 1992, Julie Ewington curated School class to playground, 1958-1992 / Keith Looby, at Canberra School of Art Gallery; a retrospective drawing on a long-running series of paintings and prints based on Looby's own school experience, as an early site of social relation, class and institutionalisation.

In 2021, Looby returned to exhibiting with concurrent exhibitions at 484 Presents in Melbourne and Spud Lane Studios in Robertson, NSW.

== Awards ==
Looby has been a finalist in the Archibald Prize at the Art Gallery of New South Wales multiple times between 1974 and 2000:

Year	Subject/Title
2000	Anne Summers
1999	Paddy McGuinness
1993	A. D. Hope
1988	Blanche D'Alpuget
1987	Manning Clark
1986	John Bloomfield's Arta Eaten
1985	Bill Hayden
1984	Max Gillies (Winner: Archibald Prize 1984)
1983	David Combe and the portrait
1980	Anne Summers: God's police dolls
1979	P. P. McGuinness with Paddy doll
1978	Keith Looby
1976	Jan Senbergs
1975	David Campbell
1974	Rupert Lockwood

Other notable awards include the Blake Prize for Religious Art in 1973 and the Sulman Prize in 1974. In 1981, Looby received an Australia Council New York studio residency, whilst in 1973–1974 he was artist in residence at the Australian National University. In 1992, Looby was named Canberra Artist of the Year.

== Looby documentary ==
In 2019, the artist was the subject of a documentary film Looby, co-directed by Nick Garner and Iain Knight, produced by Merilyn Alt and Sean Murphy. The documentary featured interviews with McLean Edwards, Julie Ewington, Max Gillies, Adam Hill (aka Blak Douglas), John McDonald, Humphrey McQueen, and Damien Minton.

== Personal life ==
Looby was married to Helen Beresford, with whom he has two children, and abstract artist Kerry Gregan, with whom he has a son.

Keith Looby lives with his partner April Pressler on Sydney's lower north shore.

Awards
Preceded by Nigel Thomson	Archibald Prize; 1984 for Max Gillies	Succeeded by Guy Warren
