= Sir John Sulman Prize =

Australian art prize

The Sir John Sulman Prize is one of Australia's longest-running art prizes, having been established in 1936.

It is now held concurrently with the Archibald Prize, Australia's best-known art prize, and also with the Wynne Prize, at the Art Gallery of New South Wales (AGNSW), Sydney.

== Criteria ==
The Sir John Sulman Prize is awarded each year for "the best subject/genre painting and/or murals/mural project executed during the two years preceding the [closing] date", and as of 2008 is valued at $20,000. Media may be acrylic, oil, watercolour or mixed media, and applicants must have been resident in Australia for five years.

The definition of the terms as given by the AGNSW is:

A genre painting is normally a composition representing some aspect or aspects of everyday life, and may feature figurative, still-life, interior or figure-in-landscape themes. A subject painting, in contrast to a genre painting, is idealised or dramatised. Typically, a subject painting takes its theme from history, poetry, mythology or religion. In both cases, however, the style may be figurative, representative, abstract or semi-abstract. A mural is a picture that is affixed directly to a wall or ceiling, as part of an architectural and/or decorative scheme.

== List of winners ==
- 1939 – Gert Sellheim – Mural decoration on wall of Victorian Government Tourist Bureau, Hotel Australia Building, 272 Collins Street, Melbourne
- 1940 – Harold Abbott – Vaucluse Interior (painting)
- 1941 – Douglas Annand – Historical Mural at Bathurst Public School
- 1942 – Jean Bellette – For Whom the Bell Tolls (painting)
- 1943 – Elaine Haxton – Mural at le Coq D'Or Restaurant, Sydney
- 1944 – Jean Bellette – Iphigenia in Tauris (painting)
- 1945 – Virgil Lo Schiavo – Tribute to Shakespeare, Mural at Sydney University Union
- 1946 – Sali Herman – Natives carrying wounded soldiers (painting)
- 1947 – Douglas Annand – Mural, Messrs. Jantzen (Aust.) Pty. Ltd., Lidcombe.
- 1948 – Sali Herman – The Drovers (painting)
- 1949 – J. Carrington Smith – Bush Pastoral, Mural design for New State Building, Hobart
- 1950 – Harold Greenhill – Summer Holiday (painting)
- 1951 – Douglas Annand – Mural, Restaurant, R.M.S. "Oronsay"
- 1952 – Charles Doutney – Darlinghurst Road (painting)
- 1953 – Eric Smith – Convicts Berrima 1839, Mural at Old Court House, Berrima
- 1954 – Wallace Thornton – Sculptor and Model (painting)
- 1955 – Wesley Penberthy – Oriental Mural (mural design)
- 1956 – Harold Greenhill – Prawning at Night (genre painting)
- 1957 – Michael Kmit – The Voice of Silence (subject painting)
- 1958 – No Award
- 1959 – Susan Wright – The Circus (genre painting)
- 1960 – Leonard French – The Burial (subject painting)
- 1961 – Robin Norling – Sea Movement and Rocks (mural design)
- 1962 – John Rigby – Children Dancing (genre painting)
- 1963 – Roy Fluke – Spring Walk (subject painting)
- 1964 – Ken Reinhard – The Private Public Preview (genre painting)
- 1965 – Gareth Jones-Roberts – Grape-pickers and Vineyards (subject painting)
- 1966 – Louis James – It's Hot in Town (genre painting)
- 1967 – Cec Burns – Exercise in Variegation (subject painting)
- 1968 – Tim Storrier – Suzy 350 (genre painting)
- 1969 – Louis James – Spyhole (subject painting)
- 1970 – Michael Kmit – Philopena (genre painting)
- 1971 – James Meldrum – Pyramid Shelf (subject painting)
- 1972 – Peter Powditch – Sun-torso 128 (Bunch) (genre painting)
- 1973 – Eric Smith – The Painter Transmogrified and Mrs. Smith (subject painting)
- 1974 – Keith Looby – Still Life and Comfy II
- 1975 – (joint) Alan Oldfield Transvestite (for Diane Arbus)
- 1975 – (joint) Geoffrey Proud – Untitled Jane
- 1976 – Brett Whiteley – Interior with time past
- 1977 – Salvatore Zofrea- Woman's life, woman's love 3
- 1978 – Brett Whiteley – Yellow Nude
- 1979 – Salvatore Zofrea – The water trap (subject painting)
- 1980 – Brian Dunlop – The old physics building (genre painting)
- 1981 – William Delafield Cook – A French family (subject painting)
- 1982 – Salvatore Zofrea – Psalm 24 (genre)
- 1984 – Tim Storrier – The Burn
- 1986 – Wendy Sharpe – Black Sun – Morning and Night, Nigel Thomson – The State Institution
- 1987 – Marcus Beilby – Crutching the Ewes, Bob Marchant – The Grand Parade Sydney Show
- 1988 – Bob Marchant – Catching rabbits and yabbies at 5-mile dam
- 1989 – John Olsen – Don Quixote Enters the Inn
- 1990 – Robert Hollingworth – Going Away/Looking Back
- 1991/92 – Kevin Connor – Najaf (Iraq) June 1991
- 1992/93 – John Montefiore – Life Series
- 1993/94 – Noel McKenna – Boy Dressed as Batman 2 (Diptych)
- 1995 – Juli Haas – By the Banks of Her Own Lagoon
- 1996 – Aida Tomescu – Grey-to-Grey
- 1997 – Kevin Connor – The Man with itchy fingers and other figures Gare du Nord
- 1998 – Robert Jacks – Changed into a weeping willow
- 1999 – Anne Wallace – Secret Paintings
- 2000 – John Peart – Snailsnake
- 2001 – Euan Macleod – Exquisite Corpse with Fire, Highly commended: Elisabeth Cummings Harbour Light
- 2002 – Guan Wei – Gazing into deep space no. 9
- 2003 – Eric Smith – Reflection
- 2004 – Allan Mitelman – Untitled
- 2005 – Sandro Nocentini – File:SandroNocentini MySonHasTwoMothers2005.jpg#filelinks
- 2006 – Jiawei Shen – Peking treaty 1901
- 2007 – David Disher – Axis of Elvis
- 2008 – Rodney Pople – Stage fright
- 2009 – Ivan Durrant – ANZAC Day Match
- 2010 – Michael Lindeman – Paintings, prints & wall hangings
- 2011 – Peter Smeeth – The artist's fate
- 2012 – Nigel Milsom – Judo House pt 4 (Golden mud)
- 2013 – Victoria Reichelt – After (books)
- 2014 – Andrew Sullivan – T-rex (tyrant lizard king)
- 2015 – Jason Phu – I was at yum cha when in rolled the three severed heads of Buddha: fear, malice and death
- 2016 – Esther Stewart – Flatland dreaming
- 2017 – Joan Ross – Oh history, you lied to me
- 2018 – Kaylene Whiskey – Kaylene TV
- 2019 - McLean Edwards - The first girl that knocked on his door
- 2020 – Marikit Santiago – The divine
- 2021 – Georgia Spain – Getting down or falling up
- 2022 – Claire Healy and Sean Cordeiro – Raiko and Shuten-dōji
- 2023 – Doris Bush Nungarrayi – Mamunya ngalyananyi (Monster coming)
- 2024 – Naomi Kantjuriny – Minyma mamu tjuta
- 2025 — Gene A'Hern — Sky painting
