= Dress-up =

Game involving costumes played by people

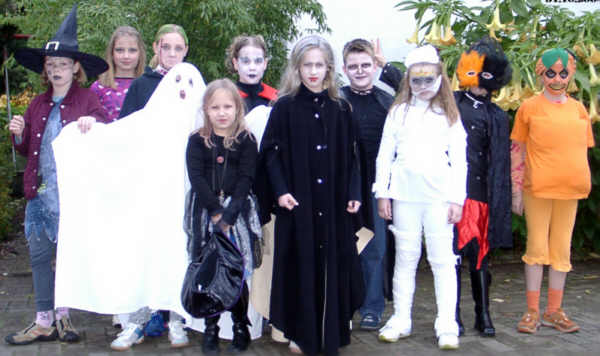
Halloween costume party with a ghost

Dress-up is a children's game in which costumes or clothing are put on a person or on a doll, for role-playing or aesthetics purposes. In the UK the game is called dressing up. In the mid-1990s, dress-up games also became a video game genre in which customizing a virtual character's appearance is the primary focus.

== Paper dolls ==
The extension of playing dress up onto dolls made of paper can be traced back as far as the mid-1700s. They have enjoyed great popularity around the world, as they are relatively cheap to produce, yet still offer a rich, dress up experience. They had been published in books, in newspapers and in magazines. In the 20th century, the genre was dominated by dolls created by artist Tom Tierny.

== Virtual dress-up ==
=== Early dolls ===
In the mid- to late 1990s, webmasters began creating interactive virtual dress-up games in which a person could drag and drop clothes onto a paper doll-like image. One of the most notable early adaptors of virtual dress up technology were the Kisekae Set System (KiSS), which were developed in Japan. These stand-alone games featured a manga-styled model and a small wardrobe. The next phenomenon was Dollz: small, pixel-art GIF images that were presented scattered on websites, and allowed users to be dragged onto the pixel dolls.

Dollz are generally created by taking a base body (a drawing of a bald and naked body created for this purpose), and then drawing hair, clothes and accessories onto it. The creators are usually women. Dollz were first created to be used as avatars on The Palace Chat Program in 1995. The invention of dollz is attributed to Melicia Greenwood (also known as artgrrl, or shatteredInnocents), mainly because of her detailed web publishing on the history of dollz. Her new avatars were freely distributed on the main Palace server, the "Mansion". Within weeks thousands of creatively modified dollz were redistributed around the many Palace servers, replacing the default smiley face avatars that were previously used. Many teenagers adopted dollz avatars as a sign of rebellion against older Palace users.

=== Adobe Flash ===
By 2007, dress up games had changed. With the introduction of Macromedia (later Adobe) Flash technology, the number of dress-up games creators dramatically increased. Flash offered a visual-based way for artists to learn simple programming, and put a powerful tool in the hands of doll enthusiasts. The number of games and websites grew, as companies found easy success in a market that was previously under-supplied.

=== Doll maker renaissance ===
In the late 2010s, a few websites managed by dedicated dress up fans utilized Adobe Flash to create dress up games that also allow complete customization of the featured character, advancing the genre to "doll makers". These applications also featured extensive hairstyle and clothing choices, allowing for longer gameplay. The games pushed beyond the usual stereotypes of the genre, and expanded to more pop culture and fantasy themes.

== See also ==
- Casio Loopy
- Cosplay
- Dress Me Up (disambiguation)
- "Dress You Up"
- Jesus Dress Up
- Paper doll
