= Caricature =

Simplified or exaggerated artistic image

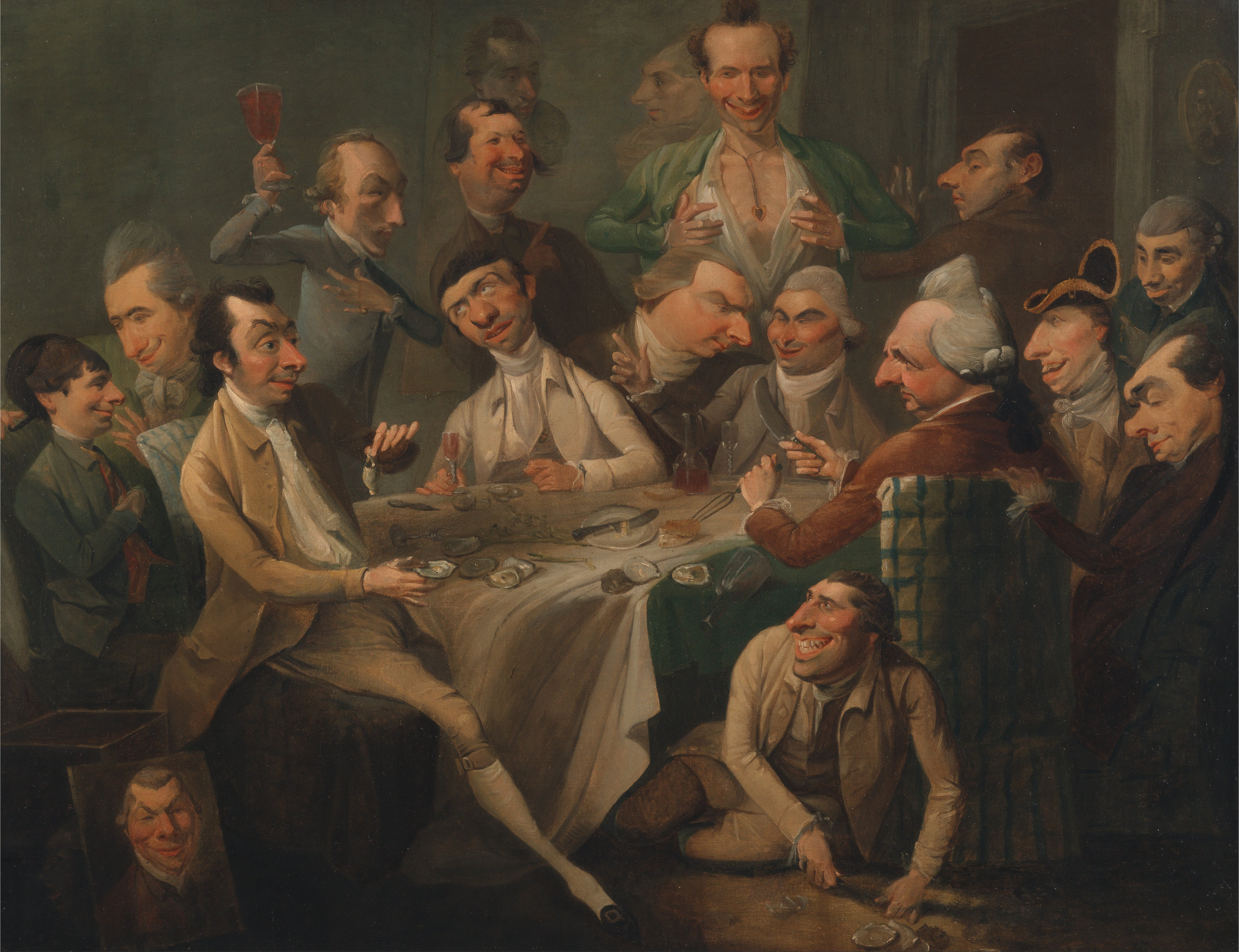
A Caricature Group John Hamilton Mortimer, 1766

A caricature is an often humorous rendered image showing the features of its subject in a simplified or exaggerated way through sketching, pencil strokes, or other artistic drawings (compare to: cartoon). Caricatures can be either insulting or complimentary, and can serve a political purpose, be drawn solely for entertainment, or for a combination of both. Caricatures of politicians are commonly used in newspapers and news magazines as political cartoons, while caricatures of movie stars are often found in entertainment magazines. In literature, a caricature is a distorted representation of a person in a way that exaggerates some characteristics and oversimplifies others.

== Etymology ==
The term is derived for the Italian caricare—to charge or load. An early definition occurs in the English doctor Thomas Browne's Christian Morals, published posthumously in 1716.

Expose not thy self by four-footed manners unto monstrous draughts, and Caricatura representations.

with the footnote:

When Men's faces are drawn with resemblance to some other Animals, the Italians call it, to be drawn in Caricatura

Thus, the word "caricature" essentially means a "overloaded portrait".

In 18th-century usage, 'caricature' was used for any image that made use of exaggerated or distorted features; thus both for comic portraits of specific people and for general social and political comic illustrations such as the satires of James Gillray, Thomas Rowlandson and many others. The title of the British Caricature Magazine (1807-1819) exemplifies this usage. In modern usage, 'caricature' is used predominantly for a portrait of a recognizable individual (much as originally used to describe the works of Pier Leone Ghezzi), while the more recent term 'cartoon', popularised in the 19th century from its use in Punch magazine, is used for any other form of comic image, including political satire.

== History ==
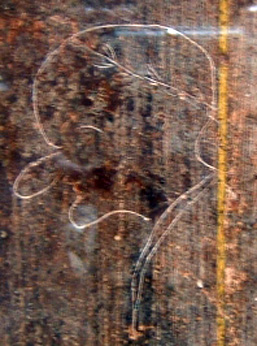
Ancient Pompeiian graffiti caricature of a politician

Some of the earliest caricatures are found in the works of Leonardo da Vinci, who actively sought people with deformities to use as models. The point was to offer an impression of the original which was more striking than a portrait.

Caricature-like drawing and portrait exaggeration was evident in the work of Annibale Carracci (who, in early modern discussions has been incorrectly credited with the invention of ritrattino caricato or caricature). Caricature became popular in European aristocratic circles, notably through the works of the Italian Rococo artist Pier Leone Ghezzi. Caricature portraits were passed around for mutual enjoyment. and the fashion spread to Britain from visitors returning from the Grand Tour; the much greater freedom of the press in England allowed its use in biting political satire and furthered its development as an art form in its own right.

While the first book on caricature drawing to be published in England was Mary Darly's A Book of Caricaturas (c. 1762), the first known North American caricatures were drawn in 1759 during the battle for Quebec. These caricatures were the work of Brig.-Gen. George Townshend whose caricatures of British General James Wolfe, depicted as "Deformed and crass and hideous" (Snell), were drawn to amuse fellow officers.

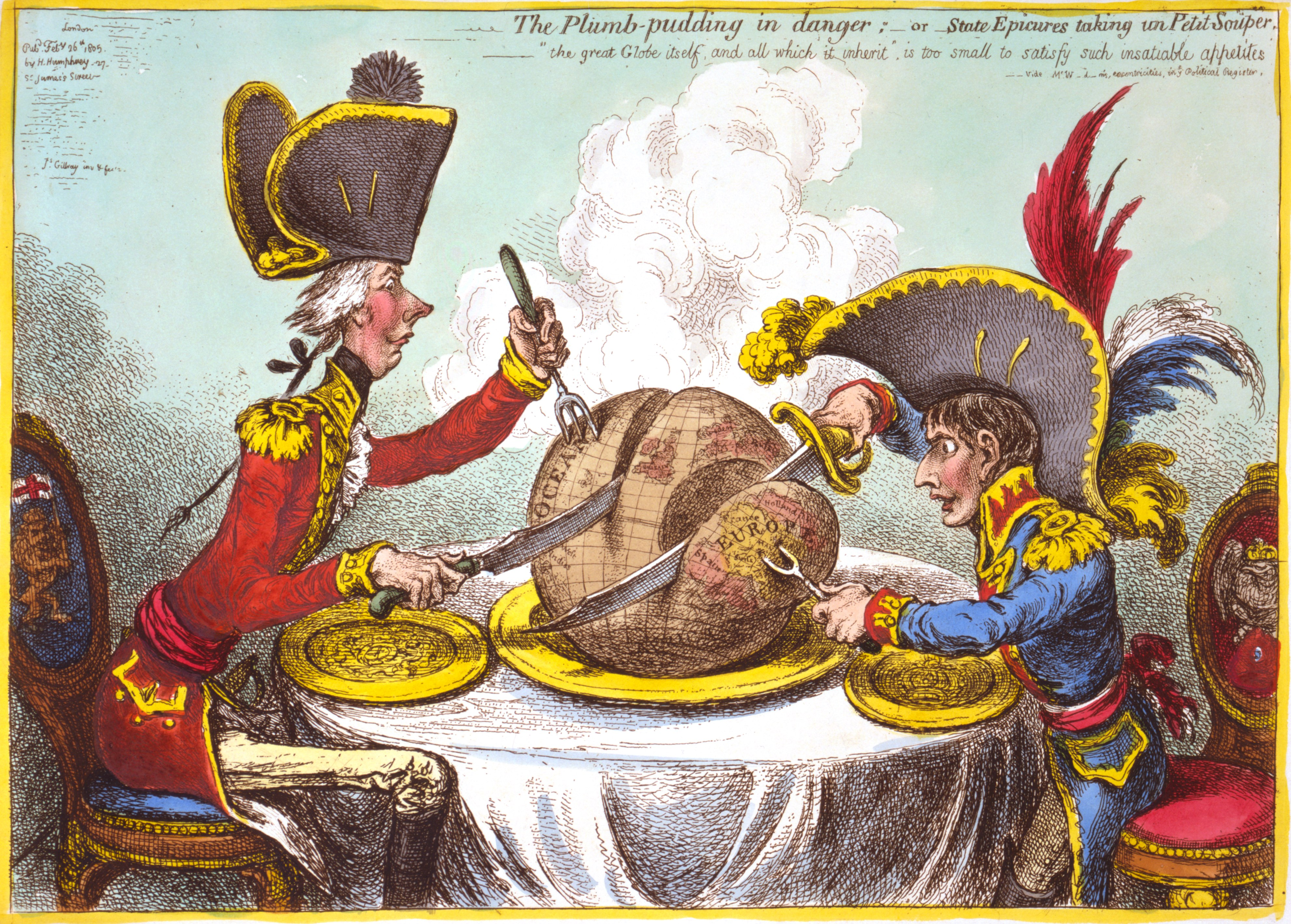
James Gillray's The Plumb-pudding in danger (1805), which caricatured Pitt and Napoleon, was voted the most famous of all UK political cartoons.

In the 18th century, because of England's liberal political traditions, relative freedom of speech, and burgeoning publishing industry, London was a hot bed for the development of modern forms of caricature. William Hogarth (1697–1764) elevated satirical art into an accepted art form and a succeeding generation of talented artists including names such as James Gillray (1757–1815), Thomas Rowlandson (1756–1827) and Isaac Cruikshank (1757–1815) advanced it further. Caricature became a valuable tool for political campaigning and both Gillray and Rowlandson established their reputations as caricaturists working as 'hired guns' in the 1784 Westminster election. Their skills continued to be in high demand; in the turbulent period of the French Revolution and Napoleonic Wars caricature became an increasingly important communication medium. Gillray became the leading political caricaturist of his time, famous across Europe, while Rowlandson's vast output used caricature for both political and social caricature and for comic book illustration.

Published from 1868 to 1914, the London weekly magazine Vanity Fair became famous for its caricatures of famous people in society. In a lecture titled The History and Art of Caricature, the British caricaturist Ted Harrison said that the caricaturist can choose to either mock or wound the subject with an effective caricature. Drawing caricatures can simply be a form of entertainment and amusement – in which case gentle mockery is in order – or the art can be employed to make a serious social or political point. A caricaturist draws on (1) the natural characteristics of the subject (the big ears, long nose, etc.); (2) the acquired characteristics (stoop, scars, facial lines etc.); and (3) the vanities (choice of hair style, spectacles, clothes, expressions, and mannerisms).

== Gallery ==
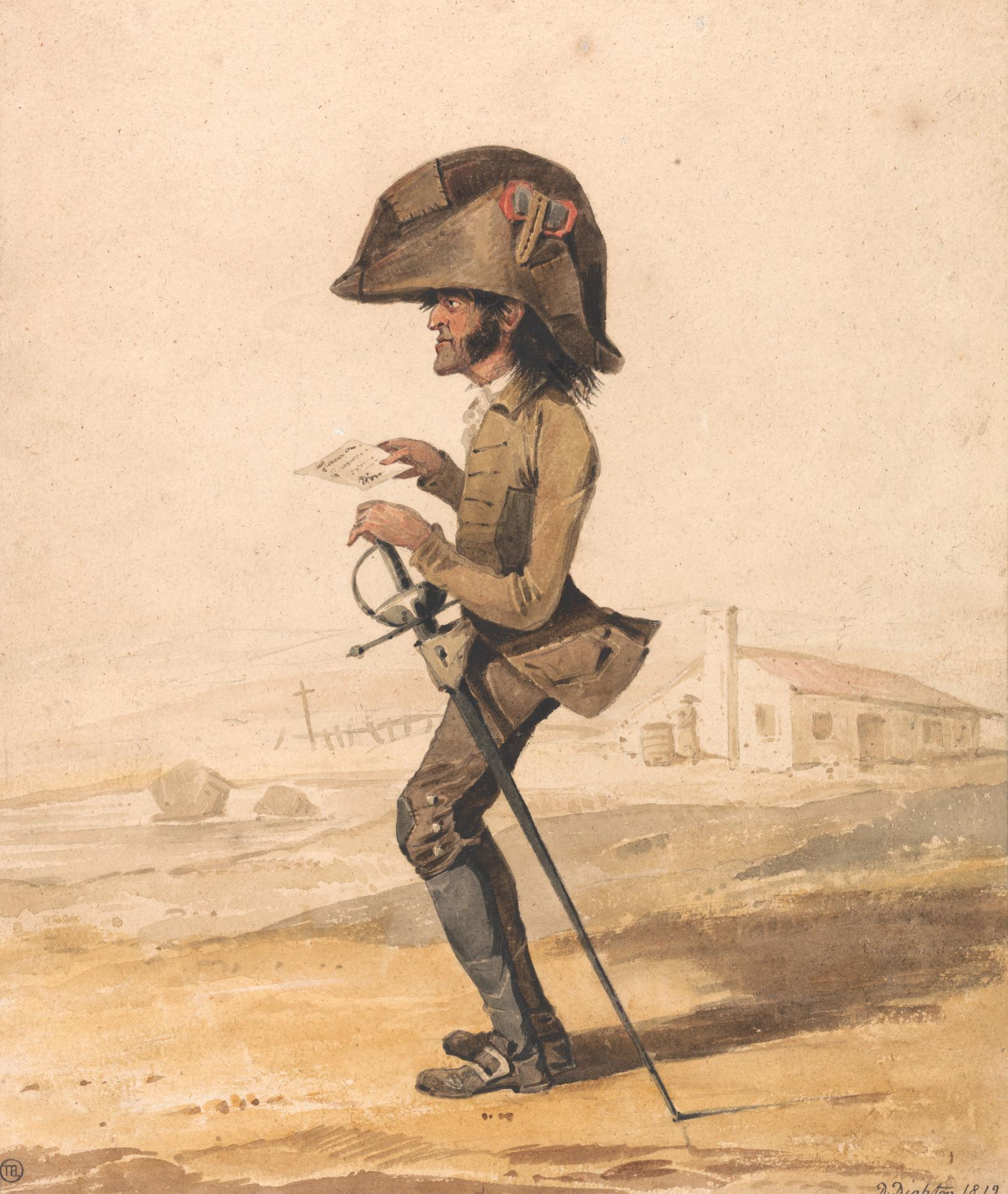
Caricature of a French military officer by Denis Dighton, 1812

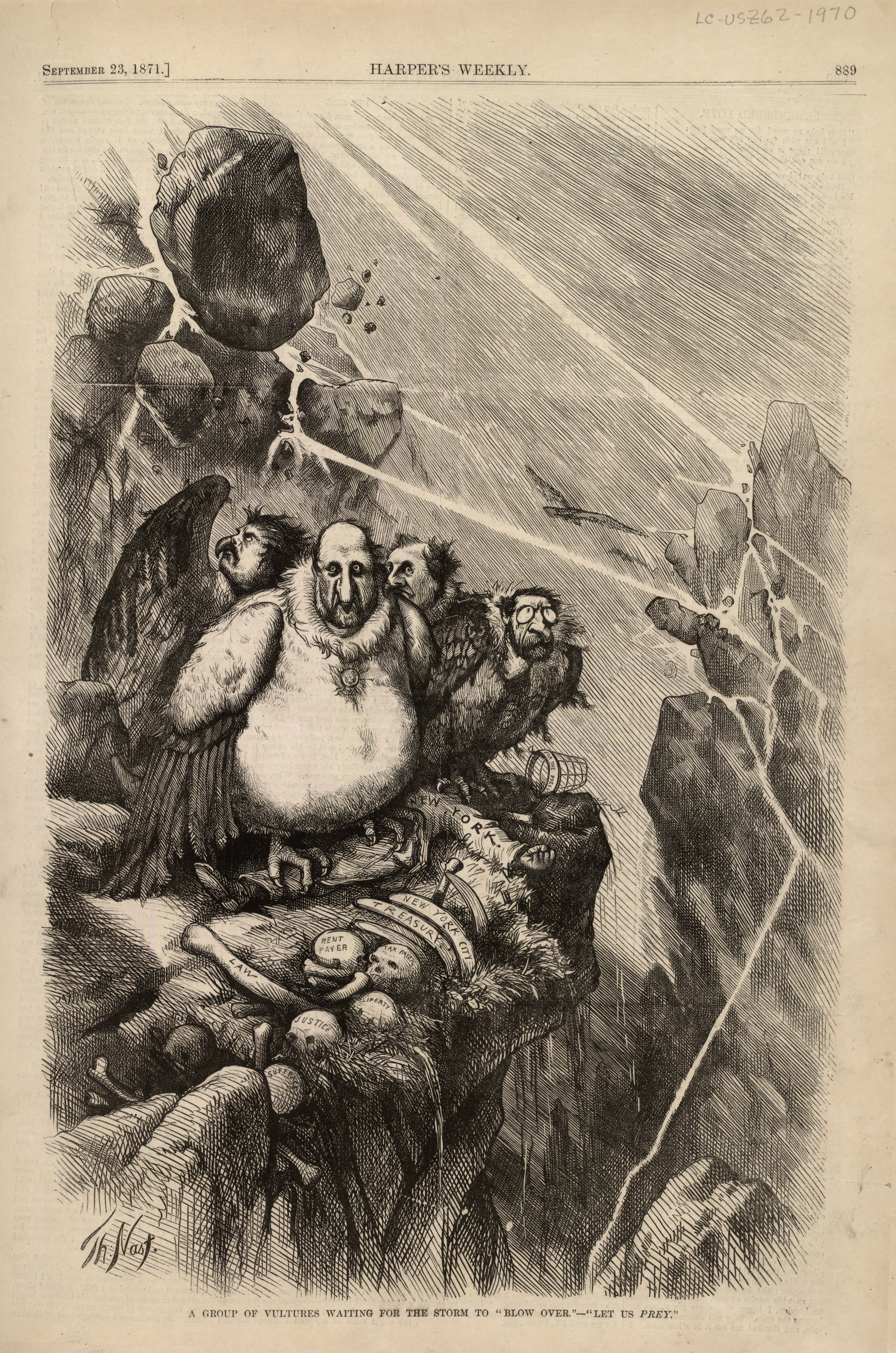
A Group of Vultures Waiting for the Storm to "Blow Over"—"Let Us Prey." by Thomas Nast, Harper's Weekly newspaper, September 23, 1871.

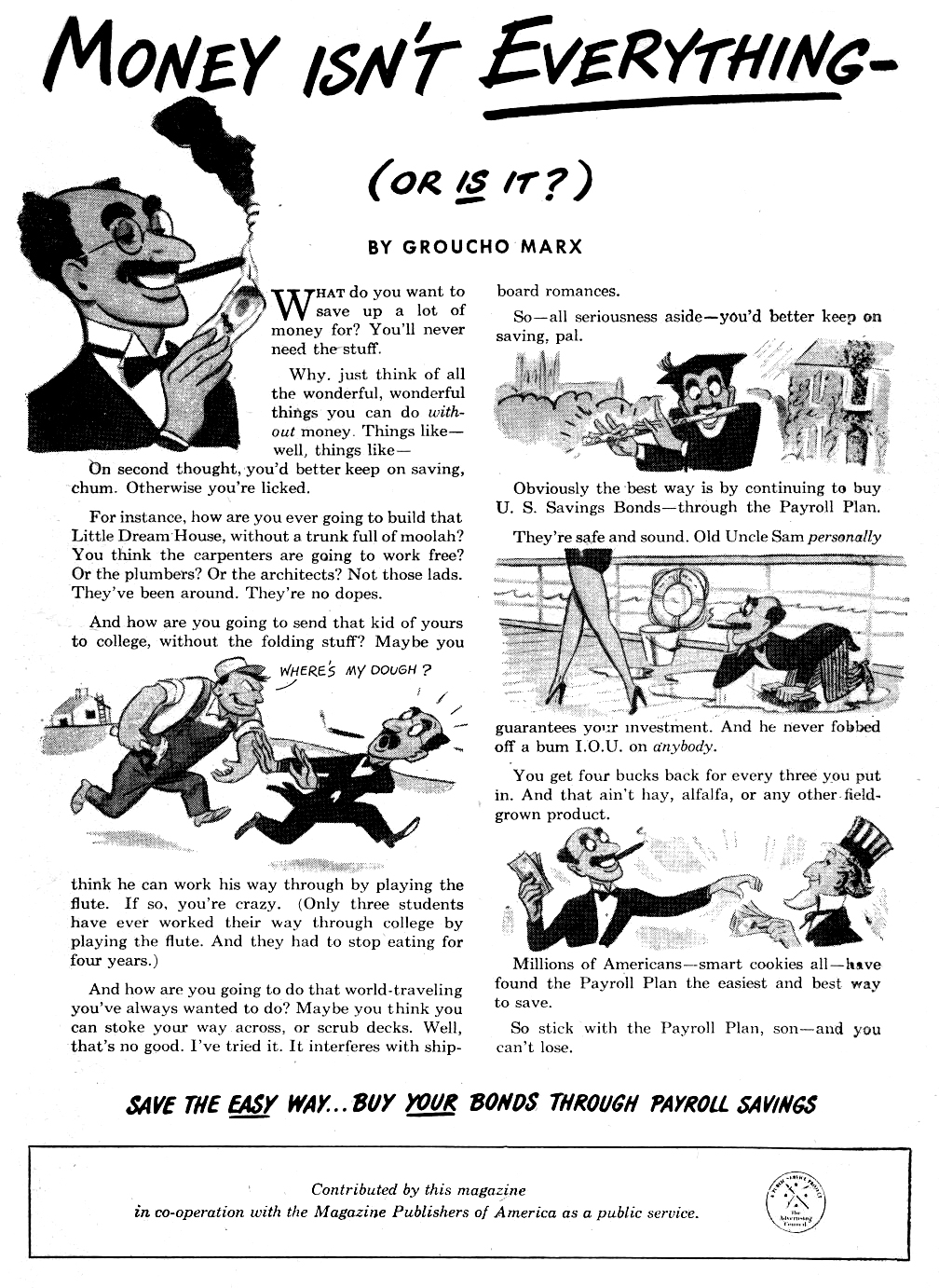
Print advertisement for U.S. Savings Bonds, featuring a caricature of Groucho Marx

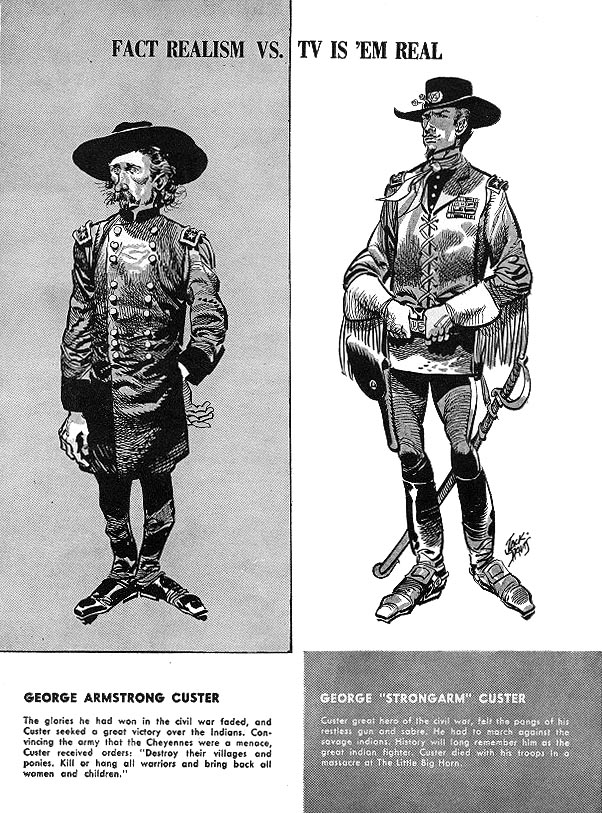
Caricatures of George Armstrong Custer by illustrator/cartoonist Jack Davis

== Computerization ==
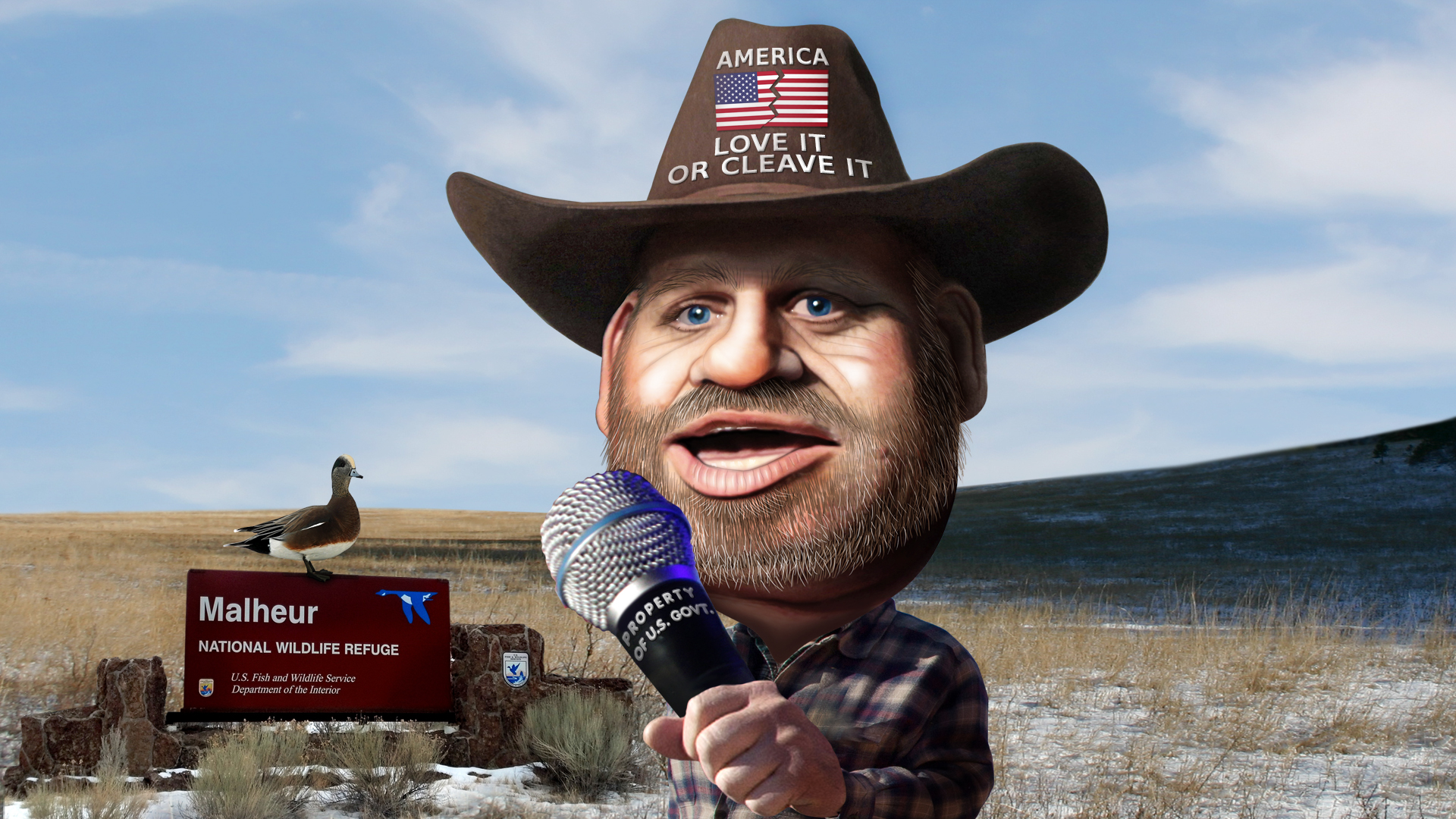
An example of a caricature by DonkeyHotey created using computerized techniques, superimposed over a photographic image

There have been some efforts to produce caricatures automatically or semi-automatically using computer graphics techniques. For example, a system proposed by Akleman et al. provides warping tools specifically designed toward rapidly producing caricatures. There are very few software programs designed specifically for automatically creating caricatures.

Computer graphic system requires quite different skill sets to design a caricature as compared to the caricatures created on paper. Thus, using a computer in the digital production of caricatures requires advanced knowledge of the program's functionality. Rather than being a simpler method of caricature creation, it can be a more complex method of creating images that feature finer coloring textures than can be created using more traditional methods.

A milestone in formally defining caricature was Susan Brennan's master's thesis in 1982. In her system, caricature was formalized as the process of exaggerating differences from an average face. For example, if Charles III has more prominent ears than the average person, in his caricature the ears will be much larger than normal. Brennan's system implemented this idea in a partially automated fashion as follows: the operator was required to input a frontal drawing of the desired person having a standardized topology (the number and ordering of lines for every face). She obtained a corresponding drawing of an average male face. Then, the particular face was caricatured simply by subtracting from the particular face the corresponding point on the mean face (the origin being placed in the middle of the face), scaling this difference by a factor larger than one, and adding the scaled difference back onto the mean face.

Though Brennan's formalization was introduced in the 1980s, it remains relevant in recent work. Mo et al. refined the idea by noting that the population variance of the feature should be taken into account. For example, the distance between the eyes varies less than other features, such as the size of the nose. Thus even a small variation in the eye spacing is unusual and should be exaggerated, whereas a correspondingly small change in the nose size relative to the mean would not be unusual enough to be worthy of exaggeration.

On the other hand, Liang et al. argue that caricature varies depending on the artist and cannot be captured in a single definition. Their system uses machine learning techniques to automatically learn and mimic the style of a particular caricature artist, given training data in the form of a number of face photographs and the corresponding caricatures by that artist. The results produced by computer graphic systems are arguably not yet of the same quality as those produced by human artists. For example, most systems are restricted to exactly frontal poses, whereas many or even most manually produced caricatures (and face portraits in general) choose an off-center "three-quarters" view. Brennan's caricature drawings were frontal-pose line drawings. More recent systems can produce caricatures in a variety of styles, including direct geometric distortion of photographs.

=== Recognition advantage ===
Brennan's caricature generator was used to test recognition of caricatures. Rhodes, Brennan and Carey demonstrated that caricatures were recognised more accurately than the original images. They used line drawn images but Benson and Perrett showed similar effects with photographic quality images. Explanations for this advantage have been based on both norm-based theories of face recognition and exemplar-based theories of face recognition.

== Modern use ==
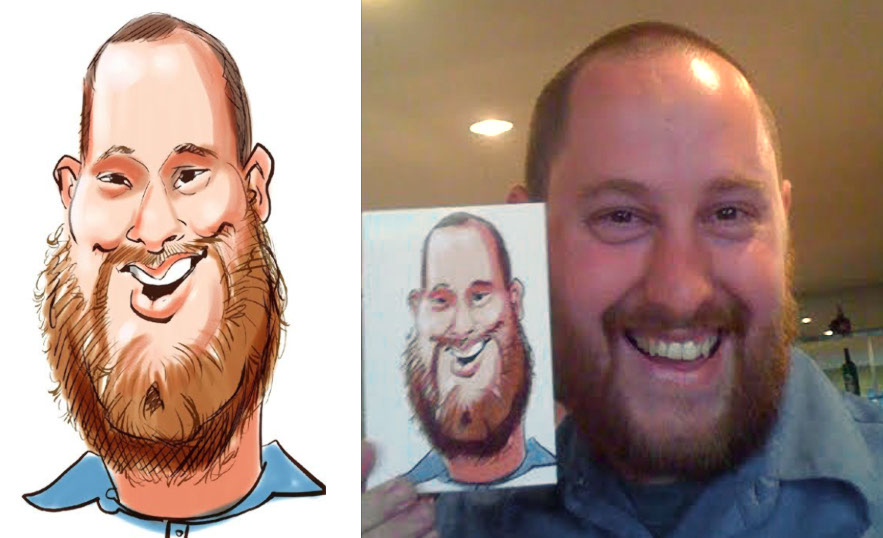
A modern, street-style caricature of a man (c. 2010), with the subject on the right

Beside the political and public-figure satire, most contemporary caricatures are used as gifts or souvenirs, often drawn by street vendors. For a small fee, a caricature can be drawn specifically (and quickly) for a patron. These are popular at street fairs, carnivals, and even weddings, often with humorous results.

Caricature artists are also popular attractions at many places frequented by tourists, especially oceanfront boardwalks, where vacationers can have a humorous caricature sketched in a few minutes for a small fee. Caricature artists can sometimes be hired for parties, where they will draw caricatures of the guests for their entertainment.

=== Museums ===
There are numerous museums dedicated to caricature throughout the world, including the Museo de la Caricatura of Mexico City, the Muzeum Karykatury in Warsaw, the Caricatura Museum Frankfurt, the Wilhelm Busch Museum in Hanover and the Cartoonmuseum in Basel. The first museum of caricature in the Arab world was opened in March, 2009, at Fayoum, Egypt.

== See also ==
- List of caricaturists
- Cartoon
- Controversial newspaper caricatures
- Darktown Comics
- Jyllands-Posten Muhammad cartoons controversy
- Persona
- Physiognomy
- Satire
- Zoomorphism
- Meme
