= Controversial newspaper caricatures =

There are several incidents involving controversial caricatures in the press media.

== International stories ==
=== Muhammed cartoons and response ===
- The Jyllands-Posten Muhammad cartoons controversy, involving unflattering depictions of the Islamic prophet Muhammad first published in Denmark in September 2005 and subsequently in other countries, lead to wide-scale protesting and rioting.
- On February 7, 2006, the Arab European League published multiple cartoons suggesting Holocaust denial in response to the Muhammad cartoons published months earlier.
- French Satirical Newspaper Charlie Hebdo Wins Over Controversial Cartoon Ban Request.

=== The Arab world ===
Many Muslim Middle Eastern newspapers have frequently published cartoons with allegedly antisemitic themes, or those created or inspired by Nazi-style propaganda. These newspapers have generally claimed to be anti-Israeli but not anti-Jewish. Some examples:

- On June 6, 2002, Akhbar al-Khalij from Bahrain published a cartoon showing an Israeli Jew piercing a baby with a spear.
- On July 24, 2002, Al Watan from Qatar published a cartoon of Ariel Sharon, the then Prime Minister of Israel, drinking from a cup of Palestinian children's blood.
- On December 17, 2001, Keyhan published a cartoon showing a Jewish Israeli Soldier in front of a Holocaust scenery, killing Arabs.
- Almost all Israeli prime ministers in the last 15 years (Shamir, Peres, Rabin, Barak, Sharon) have been depicted as Nazis. Israeli Jews have been depicted as spiders, octopuses, scorpions, snakes, thieves or other menacing-looking persons with exaggerated "Jewish" characteristics.
- On May 17, 2001, the Palestinian Al Quds published a cartoon depicting then Prime Minister of Israel, Ariel Sharon, eating Palestinian children.

== By country ==
=== Spain ===
- On July 20, 2007, the cartoon on the front page of the weekly satirical magazine El Jueves whose front page carried a drawing of Crown Prince Felipe having sex with his wife and commenting on a government plan to give parents € 2 500 for each child born. Judge Juan del Olmo ruled that the cartoon "struck at the honour and dignity of the people represented."

=== Canada ===
- On March 2, 2006, the student newspaper The Sheaf from the University of Saskatchewan, published a cartoon entitled "Capitalist Piglet" which featured Jesus performing a sexual act with a pig (which was intended to represent capitalism). The cartoon was published in the wake of the Jyllands-Posten Muhammad cartoons controversy, and the paper apologised for the incident four days later, and the editor resigned the following day.

=== France ===
- In May 2002, Le Monde in France published a cartoon comparing the destruction following the Warsaw Ghetto Uprising with the destruction caused by Israeli military following the Battle of Jenin. The text below it says: "History has a strange way of repeating itself!"

=== Indonesia ===
On 27 March 2006, Indonesian daily Rakyat Merdeka published a cartoon on its front page depicting the Australian Prime Minister and Foreign minister as dingoes discussing the acquisition of the Indonesian region of Papua. The Australian responded on 1 April with a Bill Leak cartoon depicting the Indonesian President as a dog copulating with local Papuans.

=== Iran ===
- In the Iran newspaper cockroach cartoon controversy, on 23 May 2006, the Iranian government suspended publication of a state-owned newspaper.

=== Mexico ===
- Mexican cartoonists enjoy a broad freedom of speech, which has allowed the publication of cartoons which are normal in Mexico, but quite controversial in the American point of view. For example, two days after the September 11 attacks, La Jornada newspaper published a cartoon where El Fisgon makes a comparison between the attacks and the multiple US military operations. La Jornada also published in September 2001 another cartoon where Magu states that: "As the world (global) policemen of the new millennium, the Americans are using torture techniques invented by the Mexican police in the last century". The freedom of speech extends to other Mexican newspapers. El Universal (Mexico City) published several cartoons where Boligan criticizes American military operations in Iraq, specially presenting a pair of soldiers as vultures who complain about the Mexican illegal immigration to the US, when at the same time they are invading Iraq.

=== United Kingdom ===
- On January 27, 2003, the day before Israeli elections, British newspaper The Independent published a cartoon depicting the Israeli prime minister Ariel Sharon naked (with an Election badge acting as a Fig-leaf) sitting among bombed houses eating a baby while helicopters and tanks buzzed 'Vote Sharon', with Sharon saying "What's wrong, haven't you seen a politician kissing babies before". The cartoon was based on Goya's Saturn Devouring His Son and was penned after a pre-election raid by Israeli missiles on Gaza City. The cartoon was eventually selected as the "Cartoon of the Year" by the United Kingdom's Political Cartoon Society. The Israeli embassy, backed by the Sharon government, issued a complaint saying the cartoon was antisemitic, however the Press Watchdog, the press complaints commission, said of the cartoon; "There is nothing inherently anti-semitic about the Goya image or about the myth of Saturn devouring his children, which has been used previously to satirise other politicians accused of sacrificing their own 'children' for political purposes".

=== United States ===
- Racist caricatures of African Americans have also appeared in the United States before the Civil Rights Movement, and occasionally since then as well.
- During World War II, several American newspapers and major animated studios put out cartoons and films depicting the Japanese with exaggerated Asian features and as being untrustworthy or trickster figures, echoing the anti-Japanese racist sentiments common during the war period.
- A cartoon in Los Angeles Times, published in October 2000, shows a Jew and a Muslim, praying at a wall where the stones are formed to read "Hate". Below the cartoon the inscription says "Worshiping their God". According to the cartoonist, it showed "BOTH Israelis AND Palestinians worshipping 'hate.'"
- Jesus Dress Up is a game that was created by artist Normal Bob Smith in 1991 as a black-and-white colorform, which he photocopied and distributed to friends.
