= Dress Me Up =

Dress Me Up may refer to:

- Dress Me Up! (album), an album by Denise Ho
- "Dress Me Up" (song), a song by Olivia Lufkin

== See also ==
- "Dress You Up"
- Dress-up
- Jesus Dress Up
