= Bill Leak =

Australian cartoonist (1956–2017)

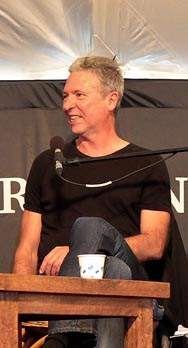
- Leak in August 2011
- Born: Desmond Robert Leak; 9 January 1956; Adelaide, South Australia, Australia
- Died: 10 March 2017 (aged 61); Gosford, New South Wales, Australia
- Known for: Illustrations; paintings
- Partner: Lo Mong Lau (unknown–2017; his death)
- Children: Johannes Leak • Jasper Leak

Desmond Robert "Bill" Leak (9 January 1956 – 10 March 2017) was an Australian editorial cartoonist, caricaturist and portraitist.

Raised in Condobolin and Beacon Hill, Sydney, Leak attended Julian Ashton Art School during the 1970s. His cartoons were first published in 1983 in The Bulletin and after he drew for The Sydney Morning Herald until 1994, when he was recruited by News Limited to contribute to The Daily Telegraph-Mirror and later to The Australian. As an artist and illustrator, Leak was acclaimed by journalist Peter FitzSimons as "colossally talented, driven, and passionate for his craft".

Leak entered paintings into the Archibald on several occasions, having won the People's Choice Award in 1994 for his portrait of Malcolm Turnbull and the Packing Room Prize twice, in 1997 and 2000 for his portraits of Tex Perkins and Sir Les Patterson respectively. Leak's novel Heart Cancer was published in 2005 and in 2008 ABC TV aired his six-part series Face Painting.

Leak's editorial cartoons for The Australian were at the centre of several controversies. Works that received considerable media coverage include a 2006 cartoon drawn during the West Papuan refugee dispute, a series of cartoons in 2007 that featured Kevin Rudd as Tintin, a 2015 cartoon depicting starving Indian people attempting to eat solar panels, and two cartoons in 2016, one an illustration of a neglectful Aboriginal father and another that depicted same-sex marriage campaigners wearing rainbow-coloured Nazi uniforms.

== Early life and career beginnings ==
Desmond Robert Leak was born in Adelaide on 9 January 1956, the second of three children of Doreen and Reg Leak in what was reportedly a "blue-collar Labor family". He was brought up in Condobolin from his birth until 1967, when the family moved to Beacon Hill. He attended Beacon Hill High School and Forest High School, forced to leave the former for the latter after drawing caricatures of his teachers. Remembering what Beacon Hill was like in the early 1970s, Leak described the place as "intellectually barren, culturally hostile and isolated".

After finishing high school, Leak trained for two years, 1974–1975 at the Julian Ashton Art School, dropping out before his studies were completed. He also spent time working as a postman. In the late 1970s, Leak departed Australia on an art pilgrimage to Europe. In 1978, he was particularly impressed by an exhibition of the paintings of Paul Cézanne at the Grand Palais in Paris. While in Salzburg that same year, Leak met a woman named Astrid and they married soon after. The couple lived together in Bavaria until 1982, when they relocated to Australia. They divorced in the early 1990s.

Leak began drawing cartoons professionally in 1983, first for The Bulletin and then for The Sydney Morning Herald.

== News Limited career ==
Leak resigned from The Sydney Morning Herald to take up a role at The Daily Telegraph-Mirror, a News Limited newspaper, in 1994. He later moved to The Australian (also a News Limited newspaper).

In April 2006, Leak drew a cartoon captioned "No Offence Intended", depicting an Indonesian person resembling then president, Susilo Bambang Yudhoyono, as a dog mounting a Papuan native. The drawing was in retaliation to a cartoon in the Jakarta daily Rakyat Merdeka from the previous week, which had depicted the Australian prime minister and foreign minister as dingoes engaged in sexual intercourse, with the prime minister saying "I want Papua!! Alex! Try to make it happen!" The foreign minister, Alexander Downer, told media that he felt Leak's cartoon was crude, offensive and potentially racist.

In 2007, a Belgian company that controlled the rights to the cartoon character Tintin, issued Leak a copyright complaint for portraying the then-leader of the opposition, Kevin Rudd, as Tintin (accompanied by Snowy). The complaint was resolved when Leak agreed not to profit from sales of the cartoons.

A Leak cartoon published in The Australian in December 2015 depicted starving Indian villagers trying to eat solar panels delivered by the UN, a comment by Leak on the 2015 United Nations Climate Change Conference. The academic Amanda Wise, an associate professor of sociology at Macquarie University, told media that it was her view that the cartoon was racist. Social media commentary, including by Tim Watts, agreed with Wise and condemned the cartoon. The Australian Press Council dismissed a complaint about the cartoon, saying that "the cartoon is an example of drawing on exaggeration and absurdity to make its point" "by ridiculing [the UN's] decision to provide solar panels at the expense of more appropriate aid". The Australian Press Council delivered a ruling on the work in November 2016 that it did not breach standards of practice.

In August 2016, on Aboriginal and Torres Strait Islander Children's Day, a Leak cartoon in The Australian depicted an Aboriginal policeman holding a teenage male and telling the youth's father that he needed to teach his son about personal responsibility. The father, with a can of beer in hand, replies "Yeah, righto, What's his name then?" Muriel Bamblett, head of the Victorian Aboriginal Child Care Agency, as well as Roy Ah-See, chair of the NSW Aboriginal Land Council, and Nigel Scullion, the minister for Indigenous affairs, all labeled the cartoon racist. Western Australian Police Commissioner Karl O'Callaghan and academic Jeremy Sammut defended Leak's 2016 cartoon, saying it was an appropriate portrayal of some communities and families. Leak said the cartoon was not racist, reflecting that if the characters he had drawn were white, he would not have been accused of racially stereotyping all white parents as bad parents. A complaint by a woman who said she had been discriminated against as a result of the cartoon triggered an investigation into Leak and The Australian by the Australian Human Rights Commission. The complaint was later withdrawn after the woman behind the complaint was subjected to alleged intimidation and harassment from Leak's employers at News Limited. The investigation was thus terminated. Five years later, academic Anthony Dillon wrote that he and his father Col Dillon, Australia's first Aboriginal police officer, did not regard the cartoon racist at the time, and pointed out that "child abuse and neglect in the Aboriginal population" were still prevalent and that Leak was deeply concerned about those issues.

On 21 September 2016, during a nationwide debate about legalising same-sex marriage (SSM), The Australian published a Leak cartoon depicting a club-carrying, goose-stepping platoon, wearing rainbow-coloured NAZI SS uniforms, captioned "Waffen-SSM", which provoked significant controversy. Comedian Ben McLeay criticized Leak's cartoon, writing that it was harmful and morally repugnant. Peter Wertheim, Executive Council of Australian Jewry executive director, said that the cartoon was an inversion of history.

== Association with the Archibald ==
In 1984, Leak first entered the Archibald Prize, an annual portraiture competition administered by the Art Gallery of New South Wales. That year, he swore that he would never enter again but changed his mind in 1989, entering a portrait of Don Bradman, which was named as one of 24 finalists that year. He entered portraits of Malcolm Turnbull in 1994, Graham Richardson in 1995, Tex Perkins in 1997, Gough Whitlam in 1998, Sir Les Patterson in 2000 and Robert Hughes in 2001. He won the Packing Room Prize twice (for portraits of Tex Perkins and Sir Les Patterson) and also won the People's Choice Award for his portrait of Malcolm Turnbull. He was also a subject for People's Choice Award winners Esther Erlich (2000) and Jo Palaitis (1995).

Of his long association with the Archibald Prize, News Limited journalist Roger Coombs wrote in 2008 that Leak "is widely regarded by good judges as the best painter never to have won the Archibald prize".

== Health ==
On 18 October 2008, Leak sustained serious head injuries from falling off a balcony while trying to feed African grey parrots and gang-gang cockatoos. Brain surgery was required, after which he was in a serious condition. His partner Lo Mong Lau, along with his elder son Johannes and his mother and sister, joined him to be by his side at the Royal North Shore Hospital where he was treated. While the outlook was initially poor, he recovered.

== Death ==
On 10 March 2017, Leak died in hospital following a suspected heart attack. He was 61 years old.

== Awards ==
Leak won nine Walkley Awards:

- 1987 – For best illustration, a picture of then employment and education minister John Dawkins
- 1989 – For best illustration
- 1990 – For best illustration
- 1992 – For best illustration
- 1993 – For best cartoon
- 1995 – For best cartoon, "And that's the Truth"
- 1996 – For best cartoon, "It's our ABC"
- 1997 – For his artwork "The Big Picture", a reference to Tom Roberts' 1903 painting The Big Picture
- 2002 – For his cartoon "Brown Nose Day"

Between 1987 and 1998, he was also presented with 20 Stanley Awards – twelve category (bronze) awards and eight gold for Cartoonist of the Year – and was a two-time winner of News Corps' News Award for best cartoonist of the year, in 2015 and 2016.

== Books and TV ==
=== Books published ===
In 2005, ABC Books published Leak's first novel, Heart Cancer. The reviewer Gillian Dooley wrote that the book was not a success, labelling the first half "tedious, crude, self-indulgent and melodramatic" and the end "truly nauseating".

Leak also released four books of political cartoons:

- Drawing Blood. St Leonards, NSW: Allen & Unwin. 1998. ISBN 186448845X.
- Moments of Truth. Carlton North, Vic: Scribe. 2005. ISBN 1920769536.
- UnAustralian of the Year. Brunswick, Vic: Scribe. 2012. ISBN 9781921844850.
- Trigger Warning. Melbourne: Wilkinson Publishing. 2017. ISBN 9781925265897.

=== Face Painting, 2008 TV series ===
Leak's TV series, Face Painting, in which he painted portraits of people who have died, went to air on the ABC TV in November 2008. Portraits painted for the show included Australian actor June Salter, musician Bon Scott and Aboriginal activist Charles Perkins.

Awards
| Preceded by Jennifer Little | People's Choice Award; 1993/94 for Malcolm Turnbull | Succeeded by Josonia Palaitis |
| Preceded by Paul Newton | Packing Room Prize; 1997 for Tex Perkins | Succeeded by Kerrie Lester |
| Preceded by Deny Christian | Packing Room Prize; 2000 for Are you with me? (Sir Les Patterson) | Succeeded by Paul Newton |
