= Childers Palace Backpackers Hostel fire =

Arson attack in Queensland in 2000

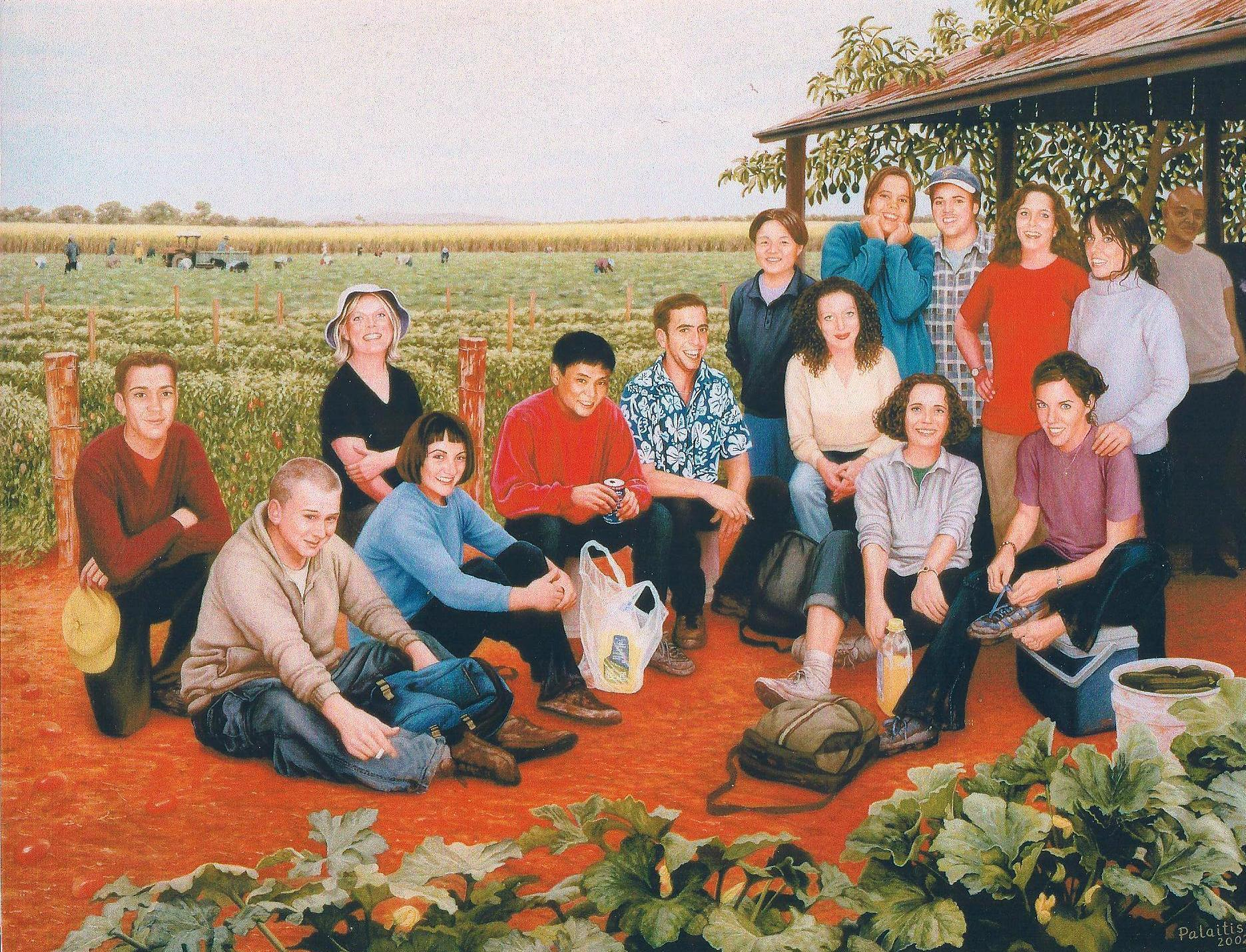
- The portrait in oils "Taking a break in the field" by Josonia Palaitis (130x170 cm; 51x67 in) depicts the 15 backpackers killed in the fire.
- Date: 23 June 2000
- Time: 1 a.m.
- Location: Childers, Queensland, Australia; 25°14′12.18″S 152°16′43.17″E
- Type: Fire
- Cause: Arson, mass murder, massacre
- Deaths: 15
- Convicted: Robert Paul Long
- Charges: Two counts of murder and one count arson
- Verdict: Life in prison

The Childers Palace Backpackers Hostel fire on 23 June 2000 killed 15 backpackers – nine women and six men – at the former Palace Hotel in the town of Childers, Queensland, Australia, which had been converted into a backpacker hostel. Robert Paul Long was arrested for lighting the fire and charged with two counts of murder and one count of arson. He was later sentenced to life imprisonment. It was the worst mass murder in Australia since the Port Arthur massacre.

== Incident ==
The fire started shortly before 12:30 am, in the downstairs recreation room and quickly spread up the walls and into the stairwell. Survivors recounted how smoke quickly filled the area and the building’s power was lost. In the darkness, and in the absence of alarms and emergency lighting, some attempted to waken and rescue as many others as they could.

The first emergency call, from a pay phone across the street, was logged at 12:31. Emergency services first arrived at 12:38 then spent four hours battling the fire before it was fully extinguished. The Isis Shire Mayor, Bill Trevor, told reporters that the hostel was not razed to the ground, and that victims either got out alive or did not get out at all.

=== Victims ===
There were 88 people staying in the building at the time out of a potential total occupancy of 101. Of the 70 guests who survived the fire, 10 suffered minor burns and injuries as they tried to escape from the upper level and by jumping onto the roofs of neighbouring buildings.

Of the 15 who died in the fire, seven were British; three were Australian; two were from the Netherlands; and one was from each of Ireland, Japan, and South Korea. Identification of the deceased was hampered due to an incomplete hostel register that recorded check-ins but not departures, and because most of the residents' passports were destroyed or damaged by the fire. DNA samples were also difficult to obtain for those with no relatives in Australia.

Most of the backpackers who died were on the first floor of the hostel. Through an inquest, it was found that in one of the upper rooms where 10 victims were found (i.e. all of that room’s occupants), a bunk bed blocked a fastened exit door and the windows were barred.

== Perpetrator ==
Robert Paul Long, a fruit picker, had moved into the hostel on 24 March 2000 but had been evicted on 14 June over $200 in rent arrears. ATM records showed that Long then remained in the area in the week before the attack. Long, who had expressed a hatred of backpackers, had also earlier threatened to burn down the hostel.

Around midnight, prior to the fire, two guests saw Long in the back yard of the hostel. Long had asked them to leave the door open so he could assault his former roommate, an Indian national; when they declined, he stated he still had a key. Another guest recounted how he had woken up around then to find Long downstairs using a PC near a burning rubbish bin. After he sounded the alarm, Long then took it outside and the guest went back to bed, but was awakened later to banging sounds, shouting and thick black smoke.

After the attack, Long’s movements were unclear. He was spotted in cane fields five days later and was subsequently arrested in bushland near Howard, less than 32 kilometres (20 mi) from Childers. During the arrest, he stabbed a police dog after being bitten. He then stabbed one of the officers in the jaw and the second officer shot Long in the shoulder.

In March 2002, Long was found guilty of two charges of murder (in relation to the deaths of Australian twins Kelly and Stacey Slarke) and one charge of arson, and was sentenced to life in prison with a non-parole period of 20 years. Although 15 people died in the fire, Long was only charged over two of the deaths to expedite proceedings and to allow for other charges to be brought in the event of an acquittal. He lodged an appeal in 2002, which was denied. Long became eligible to apply for parole in June 2020 and his parole application was rejected in February 2021. In 2025, Long submitted another parole application ahead of the 25th anniversary of the blaze, but because of the severity of his crimes he has been classified as a “restricted prisoner” under Queensland law, meaning his parole bid is not being actively considered while the President of Parole Board Queensland determines whether to make a restricted prisoner declaration — which, if made, could prevent him from applying for parole again for up to 10 years. Long remains incarcerated at Wolston Correctional Centre.

== Aftermath ==
Many survivors were temporarily housed locally at the Isis Cultural Centre. Five Japanese nationals were also evacuated by embassy officials. Residents of Childers knitted blankets and donated food and backpacks for the survivors many of whom had lost everything they had in the fire. Residents also invited survivors for meals and showers and local businesses assisted with food, clothing, and personal items. Media, politicians and investigators came to the site as well and Princess Anne visited on 2 July to meet the surviving backpackers and others involved in the disaster.

A coronial inquest was also held, and released its report in 2006. The hostel, a 98-year-old, two-storey timber building, did not have working smoke detectors or fire alarms. It was later reported that the owner had installed fire alarms in the building, but they had been disabled weeks prior to the fire due to regular malfunctioning. It was also mentioned that batteries for the stand-alone alarms were sometimes removed by customers for portable cameras or music players. A survivor told reporters he read the fire notes on the wall, which showed the best escape route, but could barely make it 10 metres to a balcony.

When it was announced that the coroner had decided not to lay criminal charges for negligence against the owner and operators of the hostel, families of seven victims vowed to launch a class action suit against the previously mentioned individuals.

=== Memorials ===
A picnic bench in front of the building became a shrine to the deceased, with flowers, notes, and fruit from the local farms; 20 of the survivors held an impromptu memorial service with a local Roman Catholic priest at the shrine.

Australian country singer and songwriter Darren Coggan, who was touring nearby, composed a dedication song, Spirit of the Free, shortly after visiting the town a week after the fire.

After the fire, several ideas for the building were proposed. Trevor negotiated to rebuild the Palace in its rebuilt 1903 style as a memorial for those affected by the fire after plans to purchase the Isis Cultural Centre fell through. Trevor travelled to the UK and the Netherlands in October 2001 to consult the bereaved families about the memorial proposals. The council then approved a new hostel for the rear of the lot and negotiated to purchase half the street-side ground floor and the entire first floor for the project. The building now includes “a glass memorial wall; a portrait of the victims of the fire; the Childers Regional Art Gallery and the Childers Visitor Information Centre”.

Queensland artist Sam Di Mauro made a 7.7 metre (25 foot) 1.5 tonne glass memorial wall that was lowered through the roof into the new building. The $60,000 piece of glass from Japan was purchased in Perth, sandblasted in Sydney, and trucked to the site. It contains 15 light boxes showing representative images, selected by each family, of the lives of each victim.

Sydney artist Josonia Palaitis was selected to paint a portrait of those killed. She said it was "the most technically challenging and emotionally charged portrait I've ever undertaken". The artist's greatest challenge was to suitably portray the youngsters from photos of them provided by their families: she managed to arrange them while maintaining the precise poses of those photos. The background was researched by her to be typical of the Isis area fields where they had worked picking crops. "The response to the artwork was overwhelming with families ecstatic with the result."

On 26 October 2002, the renovated structure, the Palace Memorial Building, opened and was attended by some 250 invited guests, including members of 12 of the families of those who died. Frank Slarke, the father of the dead Australian twins, read a poem he wrote as a eulogy. Since then, over one million visitors have visited the building.

== See also ==
- Downunder Hostel fire
- Savoy Hotel fire
- Whiskey Au Go Go fire
