= Whiskey Au Go Go fire =

Fire in Australia

- Fortitude Valley (Australia)
- Date: 8 March 1973; 53 years ago
- Venue: Whiskey Au Go Go
- Location: Fortitude Valley, Brisbane, Australia
- Type: Fire
- Cause: Firebomb
- Deaths: 15
- Convicted: James Richard Finch; John Andrew Stuart

The Whiskey Au Go Go fire was a fire that occurred at 2:08 am on Thursday 8 March 1973, in the Whiskey Au Go Go nightclub in Fortitude Valley, Brisbane, Australia that killed 15 people.

== The building ==
The Whiskey Au Go Go nightclub occupied the first floor of a building on the corner of Amelia Street and St Paul's Terrace. The space was previously occupied by another club called the Celebrity Cabaret which closed due to financial pressures. Seeing an opportunity, band manager John Hannay approached the Little brothers (Brian and Ken) and suggested they rent the vacant space for a new nightclub. They did so in March 1972 and named the new cabaret the Whiskey Au Go Go.

== Extortion threats ==
John Andrew Stuart, a career criminal, was sent to jail in 1966 for the attempted murder of fellow criminal Robert Steele. After his release from prison in New South Wales in July 1972, he returned to his hometown of Brisbane and immediately started vague rumors of criminals from Sydney wanting to extort nightclubs in Brisbane. He told this both to reporter Brian Bolton and Detective Basil Hicks. At the end of 1972, he gave specific intelligence to Bolton stating an empty club would be firebombed first and then a second, Whiskey Au Go Go, would be firebombed when it was full of people. Bolton wrote numerous newspaper articles and personally notified the police commissioner and police minister of the threat.

== Building fire ==
Stuart's warning was verified when an empty club, Torinos, was destroyed by arson on 25 February 1973.

The Whiskey Au Go Go was firebombed in the early hours of 8 March 1973 with fire begun by the ignition of two drums (four and five gallons) of petrol in the building's foyer. When ignited, the burning petrol sent carbon monoxide up to the club's main room on the first floor. The only escape route was the rear stairs which were poorly signposted and cluttered with crates of bottles. The club has been described as a deathtrap.

About 50 patrons, bar staff, and entertainers had been in the club at the time of ignition. Some escaped by jumping from broken windows onto an awning and dropping 4.5 metres (15 feet) to the ground. Others escaped via the windows in the men's and women's changing rooms.

Patrons had difficulty escaping due to the large quantities of grease that covered the escape path and the 1.8 metre (6 foot) high fence which blocked the side alley. The persistent rumors that the escape was deliberately greased by the arsonist(s) are untrue. The practice at the club was to place used cooking oil containers against the wall of the escape route. These were upended in the stampede and the fats spread by foot as the patrons fled.

== Victims ==
The fire resulted in the deaths of 15 people. They had died of carbon monoxide poisoning and were dead before firefighters arrived. Of the six person band Trinity, two musicians were killed. Three staff members and ten patrons also lost their lives.

== Investigation ==
On the Saturday after the fire the Queensland Government had offered a $50,000 reward for information on the bombing. Based on Stuart's foreknowledge of the fire, he was the number one suspect. As the police had insufficient evidence to arrest him, as he had an alibi at the time of the fire, the police fabricated evidence that he threatened someone with a knife. He was duly arrested. James Richard Finch was subsequently arrested at the suburban Jindalee shopping centre.

In 1966, Finch had been sentenced to 14 years prison after being found guilty of malicious wounding with a firearm and carrying an unlicensed pistol. Finch had fired two shots during an altercation near a petrol station in Oxford Street, Paddington, Sydney, injuring two men. Finch gave Stuart the offending firearm post shooting and the two career criminals had known each other for at least seven years before. At the trial, Finch was described by police as "an active young criminal and associate of the most violent criminals in Sydney." Finch had been paroled after serving seven years of that sentence.

Immediately after their arrest, both loudly protested their innocence at their first court appearance. It was reported that there was commotion in the dock when the men were brought before the Brisbane Magistrates court after their arrest for arson and 15 counts of murder. Stuart was restrained by six detectives while Finch was relatively quiet and restrained by one detective. During this hearing Finch claimed he was innocent, that on his arrest police had presented him with a prepared written confession, and had beaten him.

The committal hearing heard that Finch, previously resident of Australia, had been imported by Stuart from his native England for the extortion scheme and had returned to Australia 12 days prior to the bombing. Police claimed Finch had privately confessed to them and had implicated Stuart. The police reported that Finch had willfully set the fire while Stuart had plotted to establish a false lead that "southern criminals" were planning an extortion racket in Brisbane.

== Legal ==
=== Trial and imprisonment ===
During the supreme court trial Finch and Stuart loudly protested their innocence, claiming they had been "verballed" and convicted based on false confessions. They both pleaded not guilty.

Similar to the committal hearing, the start of the full court trial had been delayed. On 20 August, Stuart told the Government Medical Officer that he had swallowed some pieces of metal. He would repeat the exercise and be absent for most of the trial. Through his incarcerations Stuart underwent a total of five operations to remove foreign objects from his stomach. During the committal trial, Finch had amputated one of his fingers.

On 23 October 1973, both were convicted of the murder of Jennifer Denise Davie. The jury found that the fire was lit as part of an extortion-terror campaign aimed at Brisbane nightclub operators, and they were sentenced to life in prison. Stuart made Australian legal history: he was sentenced despite not being in court. At the time he was in hospital recovering from his third stomach operation as a result of him swallowing wire.

During their imprisonment in Boggo Road Gaol they continued to protest their innocence, fighting a protracted legal battle for release and continuing their self-harm to draw attention to their protest. In one incident Stuart sewed his lips together using wire paperclips. This occurred during a strike by warders when police had taken charge of the prison; Stuart had previously warned warders he would do this to prevent police from questioning him. During this period Finch kept up a tirade of abuse against police in the prison, once emptying his sanitary bucket over them.

=== Finch's appeals ===
In February 1984, the High Court of Australia granted a permanent injunction restraining Finch from proceeding with a petition he had lodged with the Judicial Committee of the Privy Council, seeking leave to appeal a decision of the High Court.

Finch appealed this decision in order to appeal the decisions of the Queensland Court of Criminal appeal made in 1974 and 1978. Those decisions had dismissed Finch's original appeal and his later application for special leave to appeal.

The Australian Government, with the support of the Queensland Government, sought an injunction to prevent Finch proceeding in London. On 28 June, the High Court of Australia refused this injunction, and the appeal reached the Judicial Committee of the Privy Council in London on 6 July 1984. The Judicial Committee of the Privy Council took less than thirty minutes to dismiss the application. The five member bench decided that the matter brought before it by Finch was not a matter that should be heard by the council.

=== Release from prison ===
Stuart was found dead on 2 January 1979 in his cell of Boggo Road Gaol after a six-day hunger strike. The cause of death was recorded as an acute heart infection, possibly the result of a virus. Although some believe he was murdered, his self mutilation practices and poor mental health explains his death. At the time it was reported that many police regarded him as Australia's most violent criminal.

In 1986, Finch married Cheryl Cole, a wheelchair-using woman with a terminal illness. Finch won his battle for release in 1988, after almost 15 years in prison. As part of his parole conditions he was deported back to his birth country, England. There, in October 1988, he confessed to the crime. He told The Sun newspaper in a videotaped interview that he had tipped two drums of fuel into the doorway of the nightclub building before the firebombing. He also repeated claims that he had been "verballed" by the original police investigators (i.e. that they lied about words Finch had purportedly said, and that those lies were used as evidence). He also claimed that a policeman named at the enquiry had ordered the bombing. He later recanted the confession.

Jana Wendt interviewed Finch on A Current Affair by satellite to further discuss that admission. Wendt says that "When I suggested to him that his admission might mean that he could also be extradited to Australia to face other murder charges, his behaviour suddenly changed dramatically. He said he was now confused and could not recall murdering anybody. He claimed he had been brainwashed." Finch was unaware he had been only charged for one murder and 14 other charges were outstanding.

=== Coronial inquest reopened ===
Recently, Vincent O'Dempsey was charged with the murder of a woman and her two daughters. On 2 June 2017, following the conviction and sentencing of O'Dempsey and Garry DuBois for the McCulkin murders case, Queensland Attorney-General Yvette D'Ath announced that the government would re-open the coronial inquest into the fire. The inquest was concluded but there has been no report forthcoming.

== See also ==
- Childers Palace Backpackers Hostel fire
