= Johannes Leak =

Australian editorial cartoonist and painter (born 1980)

Johnanes Leak
- Born: 25 October 1980 (age 46); Dießen am Ammersee, Bavaria, Germany
- Education: Sydney Boys High School; Julian Ashton Art School
- Occupation: Editorial cartoonist
- Father: Bill Leak
- Website: johannesleak.com

Johannes Leak (born 25 October 1980) is a German-born Australian editorial cartoonist and painter.

== Life ==
He is the son of cartoonist Bill Leak and teacher Astrid, née Wiegand. The family lived in Dießen am Ammersee before moving to Australia. He attended Sydney Boys High School and then Julian Ashton Art School for five years on a scholarship.

In November 2019, Leak was appointed editorial cartoonist of The Australian, a position held by his father until his death two years before.

Leak's August 2020 cartoon of Kamala Harris, the presumptive Democratic vice presidential nominee in the 2020 election was deemed as offensive and racist by a number of politicians and journalists. The cartoon had used Joe Biden's use of the phrase "little brown girls".

In February 2021, Leak was awarded a $40,000 contract from the Australian Department of Parliamentary Services to paint an official portrait of former prime minister Tony Abbott.

Leak submitted paintings to the Archibald Prize in 2021 with a portrait of Warlpiri Country Liberal Party politician Jacinta Nampijinpa Price and in 2025 of Jewish advocate Alex Ryvchin. Neither were selected as finalists, although the State Library of New South Wales bought the portrait of Price for about $20,000, but following some First Nations employees taking offence to the acquisition, the picture is not shown on the library's website and can only be viewed by appointment.
