= Josonia Palaitis =

Australian artist

- Born: Josephine Mills; 28 June 1949; Sydney
- Education: National Art School
- Occupation: Painter
- Website: jpstudio.com.au

Josonia Palaitis (born Josephine Mills, 28 June 1949) is an Australian artist living in Sydney, Australia. She won the 1994 Doug Moran National Portrait Prize with a portrait of her father artist John Mills. In 1995 she won the Archibald Prize People's Choice award with a portrait of Bill Leak (artist and cartoonist for the Australian Newspaper).

The National Portrait Gallery commissioned her in 2000 to paint its first portrait of an Australian Prime Minister to include their spouse, a portrait of John Howard and his wife Janette. In 2002 she was commissioned to paint the Childers Memorial Portrait which depicts the fifteen young backpackers who died in a hostel fire in Childers, Queensland in 2000.

Her portrait Patrick Dodson, Yawuru Man, (of chairman of the Council for Aboriginal Reconciliation, Pat Dodson), was a finalist in the 1998 Doug Moran National Portrait Prize and is in the collection of the National Library of Australia. Other prominent people she has painted include:

- politician John Howard (1980 Archibald finalist)
- musician James Morrison (1993 Archibald finalist),
- television presenter Ray Martin (1996 Archibald finalist),
- Cardinal Edward Clancy (1998 Portia Geach Memorial Award finalist),
- journalist Paddy McGuinness (2003 Portia Geach Memorial Award finalist), and
- Justice Michael Kirby (2006 Archibald Prize finalist).

Awards
Preceded by Bill Leak	People's Choice Award; 1995 for portrait of painter Bill Leak	Succeeded by Robert Hannaford
