= West Papuan refugee dispute =

In early 2006, a furore erupted in Indonesia over the Australian government's decision to grant temporary protection visas to 42 Indonesian asylum seekers from West Papua region. The controversy caused diplomatic tension as well as a "war of cartoons", with newspapers in Indonesia and Australia trading hits over a decision that the Indonesians say questions the sovereignty that they officially have over West Papua.

The issue was caused by the Australian Government's decision through the immigration department to allow visas to 42 refugees that arrived in January. Part of the Indonesian concern is based on the speed at which these asylum seekers were processed – forty-two were processed in just two months, with the remaining asylum seeker having been approved in mid-April. The Indonesian government took the move as a direct challenge, inferring that the approval of the temporary protection visas indicated that the Australian Government agreed with the West Papuans that they face persecution if they returned home.

== Cartoons ==
On 27 March 2006, Indonesian newspaper Rakyat Merdeka published a front-page editorial cartoon depicting the then Australian Prime Minister John Howard and Australian Foreign Minister Alexander Downer as dingoes. The cartoon was intended to protest the acceptance of the Papuan refugees by the Australian Government.

The Weekend Australian published a retaliatory cartoon by Bill Leak on 1 April 2006, apparently depicting Indonesian President Susilo Bambang Yudhoyono as a dog, copulating with a Papuan native.

Alexander Downer labelled both cartoons "tasteless and grotesque", while Andi Mallarangeng, the spokesperson for President Yudhoyono said the cartoon was "in poor taste".

In response to The Australian cartoon, Indonesian activists in Makassar, South Sulawesi, demanded that Australian guests be evicted from their hotels and searched hotels across the city for tourists from the country.

== See also ==
- Herman Wainggai – The leader of the West Papuan Asylum seekers
- Papua conflict
- Foreign relations of Indonesia
- Foreign relations of Australia
