= Caricature Museum, Mexico City =

Coordinates: 19°26′08.3″N 99°07′57.8″W

Caricature Museum
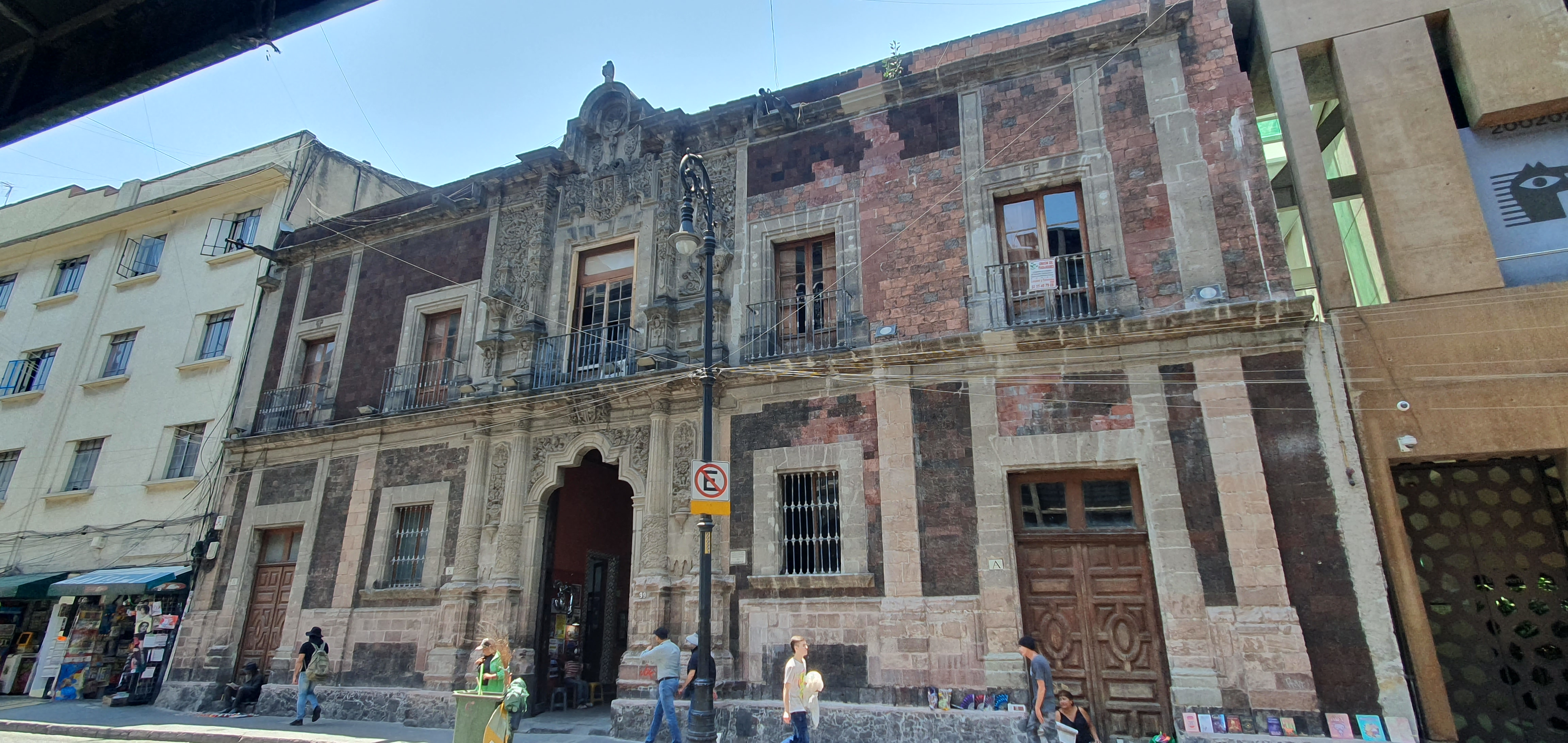
- Façade of the museum
- Interactive map of the Caricature Museum area

General information
- Architectural style: New Spanish Baroque
- Location: Mexico City, Mexico

The Caricature Museum (Museo de la Caricatura in Spanish) is located in an 18th-century Baroque building in the historic center of Mexico City. It was opened in 1987 to preserve and promote the history of Mexican cartooning, done for both political and entertainment purposes. The historic building it occupies was originally the home of Cristo College, a royal college established in 1612.

== The museum ==
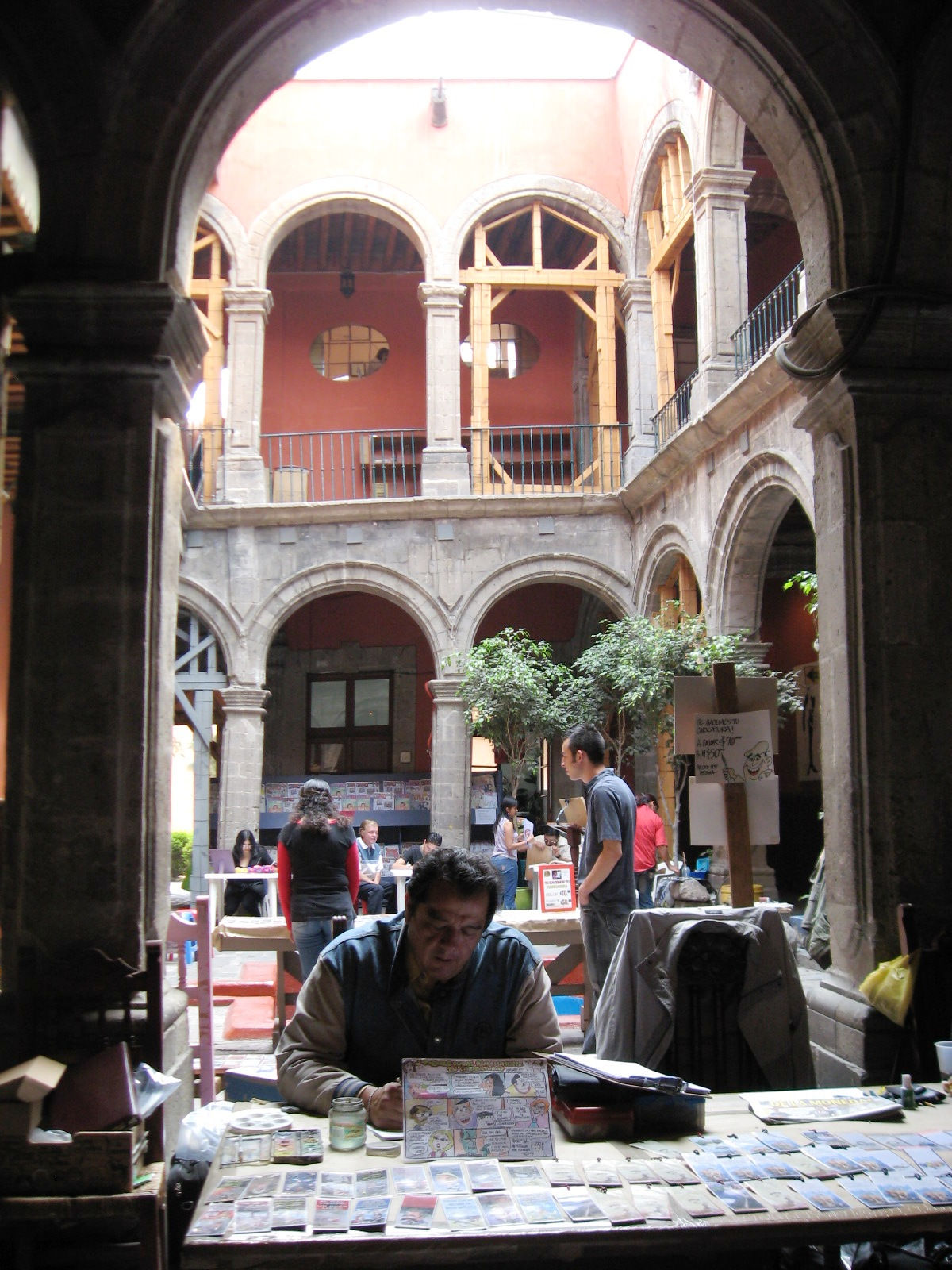
Entrance to museum with vendor

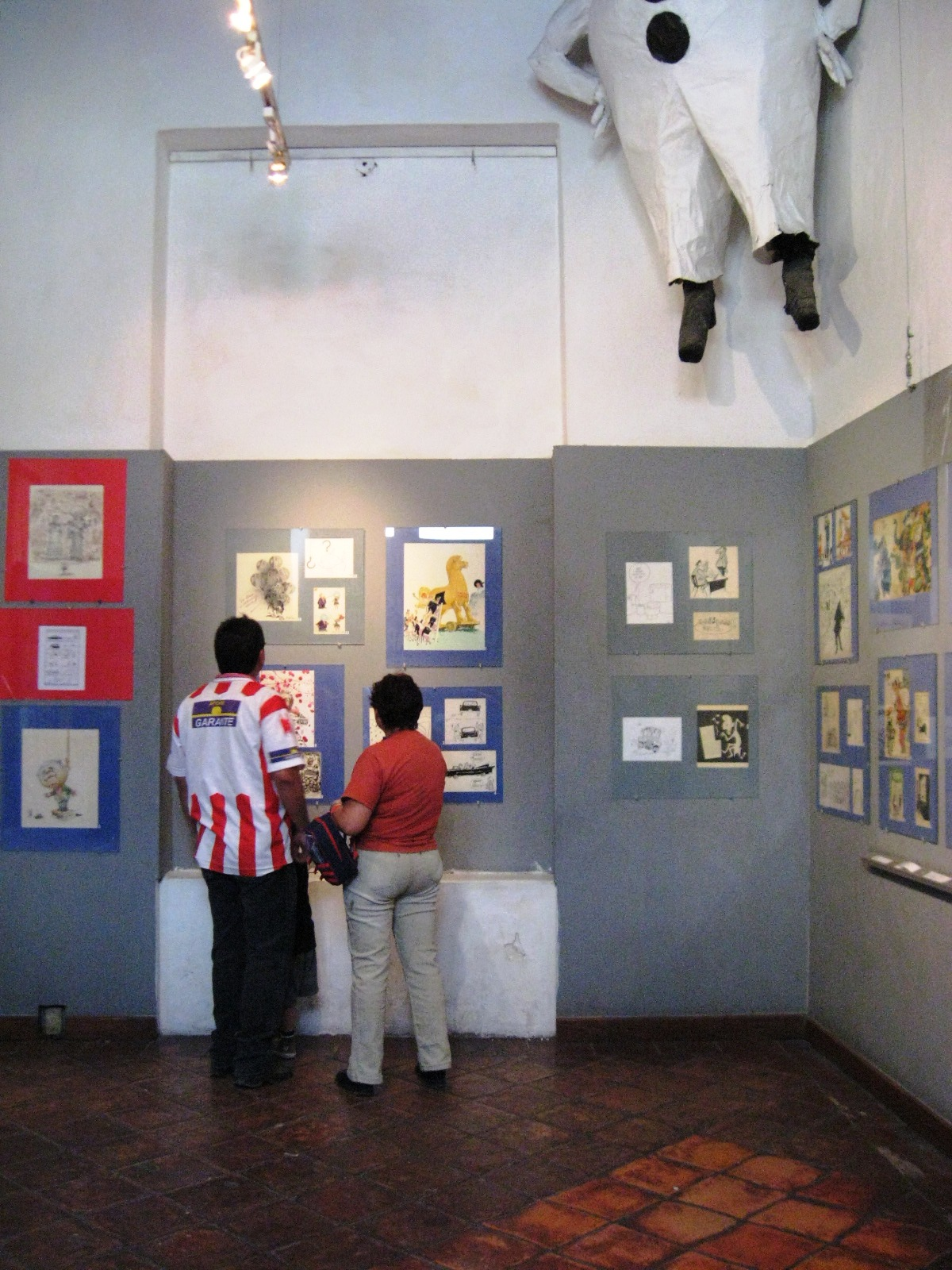
Display in the permanent collection hall

The Caricature Museum was inaugurated in 1987 to "preserve, reprint and disseminate artistic works realized by Mexican cartoonists over history." The museum also offers workshops dedicated to cartooning, and other types of drawing. The permanent collection is in one hall on the ground floor, and begins with mostly political cartoons from the Porfirio Díaz presidency. Among these are 65 lithographs done between 1861 and 1875. Temporary exhibitions are held in the other hall of the ground floor, called the Hall of Mexican Expressive Art. The museum has hosted exhibition by famous-name artists such as José Clemente Orozco and Frida Kahlo, focusing on their political cartoon work and sketches. They have also recently held themed exhibitions such as "Piracy in the Modern World" and "Cartoons of the 19th Century.

The Mexican Society of Cartoonists (La Sociedad Mexicana de Caricaturistas) has an exhibition hall, and also hosts temporary exhibitions, art workshops, conferences and book presentations, mostly on the museum's upper floor.

== Cristo College building ==
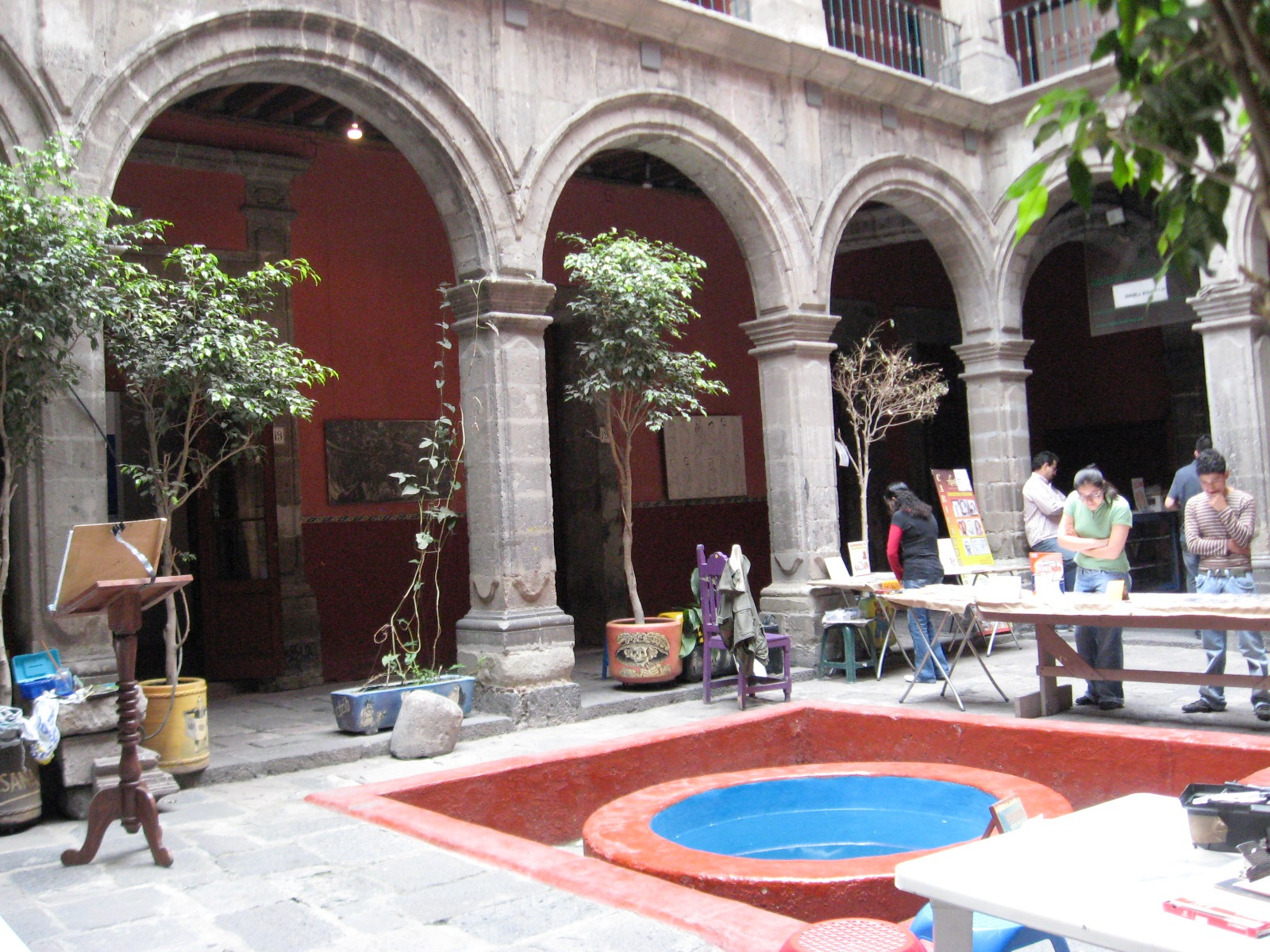
Patio of the building

The building at 104 Donceles Street was originally the home of the Cristo College, founded by Don Cristobal Vargas de Valdez in 1612, when it received its royal charter. The college began with a dean and twelve students who took classes at San Ildefonso College and the College of San Pedro y San Pablo. No classes were given in this building, but it was still called a college because it offered scholarships for students living there. The college almost closed in 1774 due to lack of funds, and was subsequently merged with San Ildefonso College in 1775.

The present-day building was constructed between 1770 and 1780, replacing the one built by Vargas de Valdez. While it has a number of minor alterations over the years it is basically the same Baroque facade and a small patio, and is considered to be a prime example of an 18th-century residence. The facade is of two levels and faced with tezontle, a blood-red volcanic stone. Windows and doors of the main facade are framed with chiluca, a greyish-white stone. The portal shares similarities with the Colegio Grande portal of the San Ildefonso College, with which this building was associated. The lower arch is flanked by paired columns, which are fluted only in the upper part. The upper level of the portal is profusely decorated with plant designs with estipite (inverted, truncated, slender pyramid) designs. The cornice is very simple, containing a relief of a crucifix. Upon entering the main door, there is a long, narrow hallway that leads to a very small patio area.
