= The Palace (computer program) =

Computer program to access graphical chat rooms

- Developers: Time Warner Interactive, independent developers
- Release: November 1995
- Operating system: Mac OS 9, Mac OS X, Linux, and Microsoft Windows
- Type: Virtual community, client
- License: Proprietary
- Website: www.thepalace.com

The Palace is a computer program to access graphical chat room servers, called palaces, in which users may interact with one another using graphical avatars overlaid on a graphical backdrop. The software concept was originally created by Jim Bumgardner and produced by Time Warner in 1994, and was first opened to the public in November 1995.

While there is no longer any official support for the original program, a new client has been developed and is actively maintained by Jameson Heesen. Many chat servers are still operating and can be found on the Palace Portal Live Directory. Palace clients and servers are available for Mac OS 9, Mac OS X, Linux, and Microsoft Windows.

== Concept and design ==
=== Palaces ===
Each room in a palace is represented by a large image that serves as a backdrop for users. By clicking on certain areas in a room called "doors", users can travel either to different rooms in the same palace, another palace server, or an address leading to a different service, such as websites and email. In some rooms, users are allowed to paint on the backdrop using a simple suite of drawing tools. User messages appear as chat bubbles above their avatar, similar to those in comic books, and stored in a chat log.

=== Avatars ===
The Palace has an avatar system that allows users to combine small, partially transparent images. Once a member has created an avatar, the member can pick up various pieces of clothing or other accessories. By default, users are represented by spherical smiley face emoticons, but can also wear up to nine separate bitmap images known as "props."

In Q3 1997, several users began using doll-inspired images as avatars with a customizable appearance. The avatars were known as "Little People" before later collectively named Dollz. A fanzine credited the creation of Dollz to Rainman, who based his "Sk8er" doll on his comic strip. Other sources claimed that Melicia Greenwood created the first Dollz, basing her avatar on Barbie while catering to counter-culture audiences of preps, goths, and skaters. Other popular Dollz used on The Palace were Wonderkins, Silents, and Divas (based on Diva Starz).

Dollz became popular with the users on The Palace, particularly teenagers, with several rooms dedicated to unofficial Dollz editing contests. Teenagers also used Dollz as avatars as a sign of rebellion against The Palace's older users. The popularity of Dollz has inspired several personal websites dedicated to creating and customizing Dollz, outside of The Palace community. The majority of Dollz creators were female. Dollz can be seen as a precursor to virtual dress-up games.

== History ==
The Palace was originally created by Jim Bumgardner and produced by Time Warner Interactive in 1994, with its official website launching to the public in November 1995. Bumgardner incorporated many features of Idaho, an in-house authoring tool he had previously developed for making multimedia CD-ROMs. One of the features of Idaho was IPTSCRAE, a Forth-like programming language. The name is a play on the word "script" in Pig Latin. One of the unique features of the Palace for its time was that the server software was given away for free and ran on consumer PCs, rather than being housed in a central location.

From around 1997, artists began to use the Palace as a site for experimental live performance. The group Desktop Theatre staged interventions and performances in their own and public Palaces from 1997 until 2002. In 1997 they presented "waitingforgodot.com" at the Third Annual Digital Storytelling Festival, which took an interesting turn when another Palatian changed their name to Godot and arrived in the performance. Other artists working in The Palace include Avatar Body Collision (2002–2007).

The Palace's popularity peaked around 1999–2000, when nu metal band Korn had their own palace chat room that fans could download from their official website. Palace's popularity at this time could also be attributed to a palace which focused on the cartoon South Park as well as the Sci Fi channel's Mothership palace. There was even a link to the South Park palace on the Comedy Central website at the time.

The Palace was the subject of a number of sales between companies until 2001, when Open Text Corporation purchased the rights to the Palace software and technology as part of a bankruptcy settlement. The software is currently unsupported by Open Text or any of its previous owners, and many members of the community now provide unofficial support for existing versions. The original thepalace.com domain was bought by a long time Palace user, and is now used as a directory for other sites.

Official Palace software development ceased when Communities.com declared bankruptcy, but a few developers have created viable Palace-protocol compatible clients since then. The earliest contributions came from David Lee, Lead Developer of Phalanx. David worked for many years reverse engineering the majority of the protocol for proper communications between the client and server. Without David's mentoring of Jameson Heesen, Palace Chat would likely not exist, as David shared much of his findings with Jameson, including the XOR(xtlk) encryption used to encrypt chats and generation of client registration codes, prop encoding and decoding, and so much more. Much later(circa 2010) and after numerous source code leaks, Open Palace was developed by Brian McKelvey. Jameson used Brian's open source Open Palace to implement scripting support into Palace Chat. Brian also spearheaded the development of Type 1 avatars, which Palace Chat adopted and continues to use.

All of these new clients support improved high-color avatars, larger room backgrounds (also in high-color), and modern sound formats (such as MP3), and are designed for modern operating systems. However, only Palace Chat is presently maintained and is the present-day client of choice.

One of the first comprehensive psychological studies of avatar communities, conducted by John Suler, took place at the Palace. This collection of essays, entitled Life at the Palace, consists of an analysis of Palace history, social relationships, "addiction," and deviance. Suler's work focused on the unique aspects of interacting via avatars and in a graphical space.

== Privacy ==
Signing into The Palace does not require any registration or personal information. To begin chatting, users download the client, set their user handle and login to a server. A child filter is enabled on the client by default, which filters out chat servers with an Adult ranking and inappropriate language used in chat rooms.

== Other clients ==
- PalaceChat, created by Jameson Heesen (known in the community as PaVVn), which supports all original features of The Palace, as well as high-quality backgrounds and avatars, larger rooms and videos. This is the primary client in use.
- Linpal, an open source Linux client using GTK+.
- Phalanx, primarily developed by David Lee by meticulously reverse-engineering the official client and was released by Brainhouse Laboratories. It's currently abandoned, but was the first viable alternative to the official client.

== Incompatible Palace-like clients ==
- The Manor, written by a former Palace lead developer. The Manor includes embedded Python for user and room scripting with an encrypted data stream. Supports importing Palace avatars. Both new incarnations of The Palace support larger room sizes and 32-bit color avatars.
- Worlize, an online virtual world using user-generated content
- OpenVerse, an open-source visual chat program written in Tcl/Tk.

== See also ==
- Active Worlds
- CyberTown
- Second Life
