= Rakyat Merdeka =

Indonesian daily newspaper

- The Political News Leader
- Type: Daily newspaper
- Owner: Jawa Pos Group
- Founded: April 1997
- Political alignment: Secular
- Language: Indonesian
- City: Jakarta
- Country: Indonesia
- Website: https://rm.id/

Rakyat Merdeka (The Free People) is an Indonesian daily newspaper owned by the country's largest media group Jawa Pos. The newspaper has gained prominence as a result of its controversial headlines and its "gritty, often abrasive, style", with articles and caricatures that frequently strongly criticize the political establishment.

== Controversy ==
In September 2003, Rakyat Merdeka’s former chief editor Karim Paputungan was sentenced by the Central Jakarta District Court to five months in jail, suspended for 10 months, for insulting the speaker of the DPR, Akbar Tandjung. In a separate case, Suparatkam, another editor, was given a suspended six-month jail sentence and a one-year probation, after being found guilty by a Jakarta court for "spreading hatred" after he published headlines critical of the Indonesian government and then President Megawati Sukarnoputri.

On 27 March 2006, the newspaper published a front-page editorial cartoon depicting the then Australian Prime Minister John Howard and Foreign Minister Alexander Downer as copulating dingoes.

== See also ==
- Rakyat Merdeka cartoon controversy
