= Jesus Dress Up =

Game by Normal Bob Smith

Jesus Dress Up refrigerator-magnet set - Normal Bob Smith

Jesus Dress Up is a game that was created by artist Normal Bob Smith in 1991 as a black-and-white Colorform, which he photocopied and distributed to friends.

In August 2000, Smith converted the drawings to digital art and launched a website, allowing users to virtually play with a dress-up doll by placing movable layers of clothing on top of a crucified Jesus. Outfits in the original version included a light-blue tuxedo, football uniform, snorkeling gear, and red devil pajamas.

== Internet reach ==
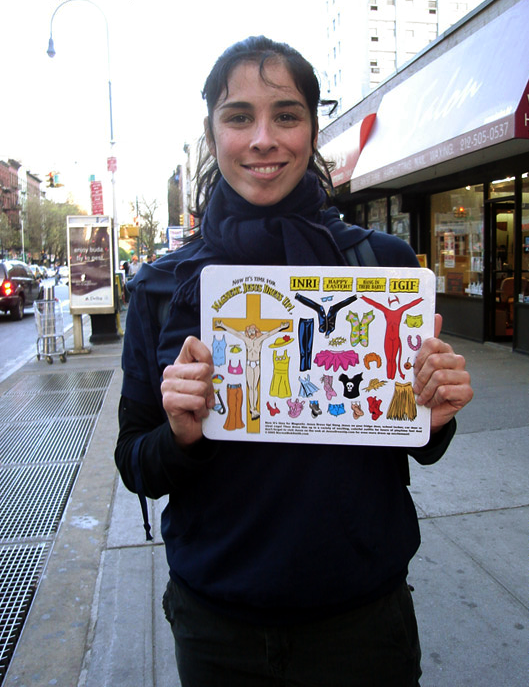
Sarah Silverman holding the magnets

Within a month of its launch, JesusDressUp.com received over 150,000 original hits, and by October 2000 had over 250,000 original visits. Almost entirely by word-of-mouth referrals, the website received nearly 6 million monthly hits by the end of 2000.

In 2003, Normal Bob Smith produced a companion refrigerator-magnet set, which was sold through the website. Retailer Urban Outfitters ordered 3,000 of the magnet sets for sale through its stores, and Smith estimated he had sold around 5,000 sets in total by March 2004.

As of 2012 there are ten versions of the Jesus Dress Up: the original, Superstar, Miscellaneous Holiday, Halloween, Christmas, Final Justice, BDSM, Wizard of Oz, Star Wars and Lady Gaga. Smith has also created a Mohammed Dress Up game, allowing people to dress up the prophet Mohammed.

Smith hosts photographs of celebrities including David Cross, Janeane Garofalo and Sarah Silverman holding the Jesus Dress Up magnet set on his website, and has also posted a YouTube video of himself giving a set to Richard Dawkins.

Jesus Dress Up magnets appeared in the segment on Normal Bob Smith in the Neil Abramson documentary film Bob Smith USA, which premiered at the American Film Institute’s SilverDocs Film Festival in Washington, D.C. in June 2005.

== Response ==
On March 14, 2004, Jesus Dress Up sparked national controversy when a Philadelphia man, known only as "Gerry", voiced his outrage after seeing the magnets at an Urban Outfitters store in the King of Prussia mall. He wrote a letter of complaint to the chain and brought his story to his local NBC affiliate WCAU-TV when he received their response: Urban Outfitters stated that the magnet was not being sold to offend anyone, but to reflect a diversity of opinion among its customer base.

Urban Outfitters received more than 250,000 complaints, due mostly to organizational efforts from OneMillionMoms.com and OneMillionDads.com, activism group websites created by the American Family Association. Following the controversy on March 17, Urban Outfitters cancelled an order for an additional 3,500 magnet sets and publicly stated that while they would sell their remaining stock they would not order any more.

As a result of this attention, on March 28, 2004, an activism group called Laptop Lobbyists alerted Normal Bob Smith's web-hosting company, Pick Internet Solutions Inc, and succeeded in shutting down the Jesus Dress Up site. Charles Wheelus, President of Pick Internet Solutions Inc., said in response to the protests, "I am as appalled as you. I find the content of these sites to be obscene and offending." Austin Cline from About.com commented that he hoped Normal Bob Smith would find a new hosting service, "one with a bit more backbone and a bit more respect for the existence of different points of view." JesusDressUp.com was offline for several days until a new web hosting service was found.

== See also ==
- Controversial newspaper caricatures
- Jyllands-Posten Muhammad cartoons controversy
