= List of Hetalia: Axis Powers characters =

The characters of Hetalia: Axis Powers (often shortened to just Hetalia) are Japanese manga/anime personifications of various nations, countries and micronations. The personalities of each individual character are based upon stereotypes of the nations, countries and micronations depicted. The characters were created by Hidekaz Himaruya, writer and illustrator of the web manga series.

== Main characters ==
The Axis Powers, the main characters of the Hetalia series. From left to right: Japan, North Italy, Germany

The Axis Powers consists primarily of Germany, Italy, and Japan (the Axis powers of World War II), who are also the protagonists of the series.

=== Axis Powers ===
==== North Italy ====
Italy Veneziano (イタリアヴェネチアーノ, Itaria Venechiāno), usually shortened to just Italy (イタリア, Itaria), is the primary protagonist and the title character, portrayed as a bright, energetic, and mostly sweet young man. In the series, he is depicted at various points as the infant grandson of the Roman Empire and is recognized as one of the weakest characters in the series as well as a carefree and cowardly soldier who often surrenders without a fight, usually by waving a white flag. His artistry and love of pasta and pizza are references to stereotypical Italian culture. He uses his adorable ways and cute face to charm girls he meets. He is portrayed as a "loveable loser". Despite looking weak and helpless, Italy is viewed as being strong as a child, being able to defeat Turkey single-handedly during his golden days. According to Himaruya, Italy is strong, but because of his cowardice does not show his strength. Italy Veneziano represents the northern half of the country, while his older brother Romano represents the southern half. Hence, their full character names are Italy Veneziano and Italy Romano respectively. In the anime series, both Veneziano and Romano are voiced by Daisuke Namikawa in Japanese. In English, Veneziano is voiced by Todd Haberkorn and Romano is voiced by Ian Sinclair. Young Italy, from a common segment on the show called Chibitalia, is voiced by Aki Kanada in Japanese and Brina Palencia in English.

==== Germany ====
Germany (ドイツ, Doitsu) is viewed as hard-working, efficient, bureaucratic, and serious. In the series, Germany is primus inter pares among the Axis Powers and takes responsibility for the training of Italy and Japan. He is a tall and muscular man with slick-back blond hair and blue eyes and usually wears military fatigues, uniforms, or formal wear. Although he has a tendency to act militant or aggressive towards other characters he encounters (in particular Italy), he can sometimes show a kinder side to his personality. Another aspect of his character is his relative inexperience with relationships, leading him to be very by-the-book as a result of the belief that things will go wrong if he does not follow instructions to the letter. Despite this, as the series progresses, he forms a close friendship with Italy and to a lesser extent Japan. In the anime series, he is voiced by Hiroki Yasumoto in Japanese and Patrick Seitz in English.

==== Japan ====
Japan (日本, Nihon) is a reclusive and hard-working man. He seems to have a problem with others being in his personal space, for he gets uncomfortable if anyone touches him or gets too close, though he does seem to have gotten used to this to some extent. In the series, he is shown to be inexperienced with the Western world and prone to culture shock, but he also finds fascination in the ways of other nations since he takes photographs of cultural oddities in other countries' lands. His character design features dark brown eyes, black hair and thin build, common physical traits among Japanese people, and has the attire of an officer of the Japanese Navy. He often tries to adopt the cultures of other countries he meets such as France or when other countries meet him such as America. He "senses the mood and refrains from speaking". Generally quiet and introverted, he is often depicted with the attitude of a businesslike old man. In the anime series, he is voiced by Hiroki Takahashi in Japanese and Christopher Bevins in English. Young Japan is voiced by Alexis Tipton in English.

=== Allied Forces ===
The Allied Forces consist primarily of the characters America, England, France, Russia, and China. These characters are often depicted as comically failing to reach a consensus in their war meetings. The representations of countries that were also part of the historical Allies of World War Two (such as Canada) make additional appearances.

==== America ====
America (アメリカ, Amerika) is an energetic young man. He is Italy's most pathetic ally. In the series, he was found by France and England (at first) before France left him in England's care after America chose the latter over the former, then later grows distant from him which eventually leads to him fighting for his independence. America is very similar in appearance to his brother, Canada, who is often mistaken for America. America has blond hair, starry blue eyes, glasses representing Texas, and a noticeable cowlick representing Nantucket. In the World War II sections of the anime and manga, America wears an American Army Air Force Officer uniform, and a vintage leather flight jacket. He is the self-proclaimed leader of the Allied Forces, and his catchphrase is "I'm the hero!" Although his ideas for solving international problems are often absurd and he is usually oblivious to the opinions of others, it has been stated that he acts this way purposely. America's ideas and inventions are grand, but rarely go anywhere. He is often portrayed as loud, obnoxious, egotistical, immature, childlike and interfering with other characters' businesses with little regard for whom his actions affect. Yet despite his misgivings, he is shown to be a kind-hearted person who cares deeply for his friends. He is also shown to be extremely intelligent in several fields. He is a brave adventurer and natural explorer, wanting to try things no one has ever done before, and he usually spends his free time either trying new foods, being around friends, or making movies and has a fascination with superheroes which he aspires to be himself. He has a prominent case of phasmophobia, which is ironic considering his friendly acquaintance with an alien named Tony who lives in his house. America is frequently seen clutching a hamburger or eating while speaking, yet he is self-conscious of his unhealthy habits and tries several yet ineffective diets to stay healthy, despairing over his weight. He also has uncanny superhuman strength, being able to lift objects several times his size. As a child, he lifted a bison. Despite this, America retains a fear of what could be called dangerous magical creatures, particularly ghosts. After watching horror movies, he often finds himself in hysterics, unable to handle the intensity. In the anime series, his voice actor is Katsuyuki Konishi in Japanese and Eric Vale in English, both of whom also voice Canada. As a child, America's voice actress is Ai Iwamura in Japanese and Luci Christian in English.

==== United Kingdom ====
United Kingdom (イギリス, Igirisu), more commonly known as England or Britain is the personification of England and acting representation of the United Kingdom of Great Britain and Northern Ireland. He is depicted as an irritable man with thick bushy eyebrows whose notable character traits include terrible cooking skills, inability to hold his liquor, a foul mouth even though he styles himself as a gentleman, an ability to see supernatural creatures, and (in)ability to perform magic curses. In the English release of the anime, when asked why they opted to choose the name "Britain" over "England", Funimation explained that it was a request from the Japanese studio. Tokyopop, the English publisher of the manga, refers to him as "England". He is most antagonistic towards France, with whom he shares a long rivalry, and is supposedly tsundere towards America, whom he raised from a small child, though he is mostly shown insulting him. Scotland, Northern Ireland, and Wales are his brothers. Sealand is a micronation whom England considers to be an annoying little brother due to his continued attempts to get other countries to recognize him as an independent country. In the anime series, he is voiced by Noriaki Sugiyama in Japanese and originally by Scott Freeman in English until Funimation cut off all ties with him due to sex offences. He was replaced by Taliesin Jaffe in The World Twinkle, who himself was replaced by Steven Kelly in World Stars.

==== France ====
France (フランス, Furansu) is a romantic and carefree man. In the series, he is shown to have a long-held rivalry with England. He makes sexual passes at many characters. France explains away his long history of military defeats as a joke from God, but he believes he is gifted with his "charms" and his supreme cooking skills. He regards himself as the eldest brother among the European nations and is referred to as such by some of them, though he calls Spain his elder brother in turn. Most of the time, he does not bother remembering to speak English, instead using French, the "Language of Love". He has long blond hair, clear blue eyes, and usually wears a blue cathedral cloak. In the anime series, he is voiced by Masaya Onosaka in Japanese and J. Michael Tatum in English.

==== Russia ====
Russia (ロシア, Roshia), previously known as the Soviet Union (ソビエト連邦, Sobieto Renpō), the tallest of the nations. He is a tall, muscular man with wavy silver hair, purple eyes, a large nose, and wears a thick winter coat and a silk scarf. Russia has a seemingly kind demeanor but has suffered mental trauma following the strain of his bloody history, and as a result, he has the innocence and cruelty of a child; sometimes he casts an aura of pure evil around him whenever such malicious thoughts enter his mind. He often terrifies other countries without even trying, especially when he was in the Soviet Union. He would abuse the Baltics and still stalks them in the modern-day, especially Lithuania. Occasionally, he stalks China, while in a panda costume; and he holds a subtle rivalry with the Western nations, especially America. His primary target of resentment is General Winter because despite using the cold to his advantage in war, he is also attacked by him every year. Russia has also been known to want Lithuania and other countries to become one with him. Russia also has two sisters: his older sister, Ukraine and his younger sister, Belarus. He becomes gloomy and depressed when either of them are on his mind, because Ukraine left him to try to make friends in the EU, and Belarus is obsessed with the idea of forcing him to marry her. Belarus seems to be the only other country which Russia fears. Russia happily promises that eventually "all will become one with Russia". He dreams of living in a warm place surrounded by sunflowers, and vodka is his fuel. He says "kolkolkol" to threaten his subordinates when he is angered. Russia is often seen carrying a metal faucet pipe. In the anime series, he is voiced by Yasuhiro Takato in Japanese and Jerry Jewell in English.

==== China ====
China (中国, Chūgoku) is the oldest nation in the Allies, being depicted as a young man who is immortal as well being over four or five thousand years old and is regarded as the eldest sibling among the East Asian nations. He claims he is the big brother of Japan and often is depicted with his pet panda. His boss was introduced as a green Chinese dragon with an intimidating appearance. During the fight between the Axis and Allies, he fights Germany and Japan with a wok and ladle, which became his weapon of choice which also serves as a stereotype that China serves good food. He is a big fan of Hello Kitty and tends to end his sentences with the suffix -aru, the Japanese pronunciation of "er", a phrase sometimes added to the end of words in Chinese (see Kyowa-go). However, he replaces the customary -aru with the suffix -ahen, which means opium, when speaking to England, as a reference to the Opium Wars. He is a bit disturbed by and distrustful of Russia, reflecting Tsarist Russia invaded China and occupied Vladivostok before. In the anime series, he is voiced by Yuki Kaida (who also voices Taiwan) in Japanese and Clarine Harp in English.

== Europe ==
=== Western Europe ===
==== Austria ====
Austria (オーストリア, Ōsutoria) is an elegant man who has interest in the arts, specifically in the piano. He is mostly known for taking control of Italy after the Italian Wars (present in the Chibitalia parts of the manga/anime) and having Italy as his servant. Austria's relationship with Germany is seen as love–hate because while they merged and became allies during World War II, Austria's presence annoyed Germany greatly. He is also known for being an enemy to Prussia whom he lost Silesia to during the War of the Austrian Succession; since then, Prussia has mocked and humiliated Austria for having a female leader. He is known for his several marriages, notably his marriage to Spain when the Habsburgs came to Spain and his marriage to Hungary that created the dual monarchy Austria-Hungary. He became enemies with Spain during the War of the Spanish Succession and when he allied himself with France and Prussia during the War of Austrian Succession. He is still on good terms with Hungary even after their divorce and they often spend time together. Switzerland was once part of him, but gained his independence, thus ending their friendship which is still denied to this day, mostly by Switzerland. According to his character notes, Austria does not wear glasses for bad eyesight but rather because he thinks he looks plain without them; the stray strand in his hair represents Mariazell. Austria is voiced by Akira Sasanuma in Japanese and by Chuck Huber in English.

==== Switzerland ====
Switzerland (スイス, Suisu) is a xenophobic, gun-wielding man who is usually depicted in a green military uniform and a white beret. He is permanently neutral in all matters and is always threatening other nations to get off his land via gunpoint. His only close relationship is with Liechtenstein, a small female nation that Switzerland adopted after she fell into poverty after World War I. Despite this, France is often seen annoying him. It is shown that his relationship with Liechtenstein reminds him of his erstwhile friendship with Austria which Switzerland violently wishes to forget for unexplained reasons. He is frugal, enough so that he will not turn down a free meal with Austria. He was a mercenary in the past and is also noted for his banking. Switzerland is voiced by Romi Park in Japanese and John Burgmeier in English.

==== Liechtenstein ====
Liechtenstein (リヒテンシュタイン, Rihitenshutain) is depicted as a polite, aristocratic young lady very close to Switzerland, calling him "big brother" and often dressing up like him; they share the same army. She admires him so much in the present day she cut her hair just like his. Strips set in the past depict her with long hair in twin braids. She does not like being mistaken as a boy, however; when an old woman did so when she was in uniform, Switzerland took her to a store and bought her a ribbon of her choice so the mistake could not happen again. In the film Paint it, White, Switzerland and Liechtenstein are the only two nations in the world not affected by the invasion of the Pict because they are protected by their "barrier of permanent neutrality". Often enjoys picnics with Switzerland. She can sew and once made Switzerland a pair of pajamas which he wore even though they were pink; later it was revealed she had given him the wrong pair. Liechtenstein is voiced by Rie Kugimiya in Japanese and Cherami Leigh in English.

==== Netherlands ====
Netherlands (オランダ, Oranda) is a tall man with a short, vertical scar on the right side of his forehead and somewhat short, spiky light brown hair with sideburns. He is the older brother of Belgium and Luxembourg. Initial notes described him as a tsundere who is xenophobic and thinks little of using drugs, which may be referencing the semi-legality of soft-drug consumption in the Netherlands, and is hinted to have a lolicon fetish, however about Netherlands having an lolicon fetish and being xenophobic was never mentioned after. Current notes describe him as neurotic and solemn, obsessed with cleanliness and money and does not like to be tied up. He has a pet bunny (specifically a Holland Lop). He also beat up Finland and Sweden and drove them out of the New World. He has disliked Spain since the 80 Years War, although he mostly appears in the group formed by Spain, South Italy, Belgium and himself. His formal debut is in Volume 3 of the manga and finally appears with Belgium in Episode 94 of the anime. He is voiced by Nobuya Mine in Japanese and by Michael Sinterniklaas in English.

==== Belgium ====
Belgium (ベルギー, Berugi) is a young woman who did not have much development until recently. She is described as the younger sister of the Netherlands and the older sister of Luxembourg, thus forming the Low Countries, and is known for her short light brown hair with a ribbon through it. Belgium had a brief appearance in both the first episode and chapter of Hetalia, and she had another appearance in an unaired episode of the World Series, but all of these appearances are non-speaking. Her formal and speaking debut was in volume 3 of the Hetalia manga when she meets with Spain and Romano and her and her brother's profiles are given. Belgium finally appears with Netherlands in Episode 94 of the anime. Belgium is mostly known for breaking away from her siblings when they tried to unite despite different religions and industries. She is voiced by Eriko Nakamura in Japanese and Amanda Doskocil in English.

==== Luxembourg ====
Luxembourg (ルクセンブルク, Rukusenburuku) is a young man with short light brown hair with long bangs covering his right eye. He wears a dress suit with a ribbon tie, black gloves and shoes. He exudes elegance, has a friendly personality, and speaks in a very polite and proper manner. Luxembourg officially debuts during the Halloween 2011 event, though his face is never shown. He is unable to leave home until his work is finished as instructed by his boss, and Spain remarks that he is a pretty busy person. He expresses a desire to participate in Halloween festivities the next year after receiving a photo of his siblings, Spain, and Romano in a group costume. During the Christmas 2011 event, he appears off-screen asking Belgium if she is okay as she has an uncomfortable dream about his old character design. He makes his formal debut during the Halloween 2013 event, where he is shown winning the costume contest dressed like a wolfman. Before revealing who he is, he rushes towards Belgium in a successful attempt to frighten her, but when he reveals himself he discovers that she is already fainted. He is voiced by Taku Yashiro in Japanese.

==== Monaco ====
Monaco (モナコ, Monako) is an intelligent, younger sister to France who speaks like an old lady. Despite her serious, grumpy appearance, she is actually quite a sociable character and a knowledgeable student fond of ballet dancing. She is also a bit of a gambler and is known for her casinos. She is also the most anxious of the nations as she repeatedly worries about world affairs and her economy. She has used her knowledge to protect her country for a long time. She has been on a date with Seborga, but nothing is clear about the further relationship. In the anime, she first appears in the Nekotalia story arc in her Nekotalia form as Monaco Cat, wanting to ban canned tuna due to a tuna shortage when Japan Cat convinces her otherwise; this incarnation is voiced by Yuki Kaida (Japanese) and Colleen Clinkenbeard (English). Monaco makes her formal and full debut later on in Hetalia: The World Twinkle, this time voiced by Yōko Hikasa in Japanese and again by Colleen Clinkenbeard in English.

=== Eastern Europe ===
==== The Baltics ====
The three Baltic states, Lithuania, Estonia and Latvia, are three young men who were dominated by Russia and constantly suffered from his bullying. Lithuania is voiced by Ken Takeuchi in Japanese and Jessie James Grelle in English; Estonia by Atsushi Kousaka in Japanese and Mike McFarland in English; and Latvia by Kazutada Tanaka in Japanese and Ryan Reynolds in English.

===== Lithuania =====
Lithuania (リトアニア, Ritoania), the eldest, was once a superpower that ruled much of Eastern and Middle Europe with Poland, but their empire collapsed. He has always fought off other countries, including Russia and the Teutonic Knights (the younger version of Prussia). Lithuania is shown to be friends with Poland and America, having lived in the latter's house for a while before the Great Depression. Even though he is quite friendly towards Poland, Lithuania also holds an animosity towards him due to the Polish–Lithuanian War, in which Poland had occupied Vilnius and ruled it until being absorbed by Russia. He has a crush on Belarus, not noticing when she glares at him and, one time, not even noticing when she broke all of his fingers. He has a strong passion for basketball and often tries to match up with America. He is sometimes mistaken for Greece due to physical and naming similarities.

===== Estonia =====
Estonia (エストニア, Esutonia) is described as "The wisest of the Baltic Trio and the luckiest as well." He is very high-tech and is the owner of the sentient "mochis," which are small, round, white creatures; each of them reflects the personalities of other characters such as: America, Italy, Canada, and England. Of the three Baltics, it is he who tends to stand up to Russia the most. He is a close friend of Finland and often shown wanting to be a member of the Nordics.

===== Latvia =====
Latvia (ラトビア, Ratobia) is the youngest of the three states. He gets bullied the most by Russia due to his blunt nature but is also the most dependent on him. He is very short, which Russia often points out to him. Latvia believes he could have grown more if Russia would not push down on his head when annoyed, which once led Russia to attempt to stretch him. He is shown to also drink quite a lot of alcohol despite his young age.

==== Belarus and Ukraine ====
Ukraine and Belarus are Russia's sisters who cause him deep sadness. Ukraine (ウクライナ, Ukuraina) is Russia's older sister who gave him the scarf he now wears. She is described by her brother as being very warm-hearted and motherly, having taken care of him and Belarus when they were little. Ukraine also shows maternal tendencies to other ex-Soviets, Poland, and to characters outside her family as well. Russia also notes that she is a bit of a crybaby and her heart is too big, making her an easy target. She desires to make friends in the West after her independence, but it appears she is struggling. She is very poor and often cannot afford to pay her gas and oil bills to Russia. She also has large breasts that represent her country's farmland, which causes her constant back pain. In the anime, they have their own sound effects. It is later stated in volume 3 notes and her volume 4 profile that despite her crybaby appearance, she is also a "fearsome" older sister and can stand her ground. The Sealand and Latvia desktop mascot reveals that Ukraine is known for her surreal "guro" horror games. Ukraine is voiced by Yuki Masuda in Japanese and Lydia Mackay in English. Belarus (ベラルーシ, Berarūshi) is Russia's younger sister who wears an old fashioned dress, is deeply in love with Russia and constantly tries to get him to marry her. Russia, however, finds her terrifying when she does this and thus tries to avoid her, though they have been seen interacting normally. She gets severely jealous of other nations if they are near Russia and will usually scare other nations off, though recently she seems to be trying to encourage others to ally with him. Lithuania has a crush on her, but she appears to hate him and the one time they went on a date, she broke his fingers, which Lithuania ignored; both of their behavior shocked Poland. Belarus is voiced by Urara Takano in Japanese and Monica Rial in English.

==== Hungary ====
Hungary (ハンガリー, Hangarī) was once a nomadic girl who thought she was a boy. She was picked on by Mongolia and a younger Turkey (then called the Ottoman Empire); she has two mentioned ancestors, Hun and Magyar. After Prussia discovered she was a woman, Hungary decided to settle down and move in with Austria, eventually becoming a couple and remaining with him until they were forced to separate at the end of World War I. Prussia first discovered her true gender when he found her wounded and noticed that she had breasts when her shirt was unbuttoned. Hungary is known for being somewhat of a big sister figure to Italy and being the only one who knew he was a boy during their time with Austria and Holy Rome. Like Austria, Hungary is rivals with Prussia since she helped Austria out during the War of the Austrian Succession. It was revealed by Himaruya that Hungary was initially intended to be a cross-dressing male character. Himaruya had also planned to make Hungary more witch-like. She has a flower in her hair that represents Lake Balaton. It is said that Hungary is one of the manliest characters in the series and is a fujoshi. Hungary is voiced by Michiko Neya in Japanese and by Luci Christian in English.

==== Poland ====
Poland (ポーランド, Pōrando) is an eccentric, selfish, childish, yet cheerful man known for his friendship with Lithuania which represents the historical Polish–Lithuanian Commonwealth (in fact he is rarely seen interacting with anyone other than Lithuania). Poland calls Lithuania Liet (short for Lietuva, the Lithuanian word for Lithuania). He calls himself a phoenix, which is a metaphor for how Poland kept rising after being oppressed multiple times. Around strangers, he assertively states his opinion and then is held back by extreme shyness as shown when he first meets Sweden. Poland shows concern for those he cares about, as shown when he sees Lithuania's bruised back after his return from Russia, saying "There's a side to Lithuania I don't know about". He is one of the few characters who is not afraid of Russia as shown in the first episode where he threatens to make Russia's capital Warsaw if he does not leave Lithuania alone. He also cross-dresses occasionally. Poland is voiced by Kokoro Tanaka in Japanese and Ryan Bijan in English for the first two seasons and by Joel McDonald from World Series and Paint it, White! onwards.

==== Bulgaria ====
Bulgaria (ブルガリア, Burugaria), in his debut appearance, he bullies Italy despite being an ally of his and Germany's, stating that something about Italy's face gave him an urge to attack him. After Germany asks him, "Aren't you in the Axis?!," he states, "Yeah, but take a look at him and tell me you've never wanted to do the same thing." In the 2011 Christmas Event, Bulgaria appears with Romania and seems to have been late due to a yogurt incident. His character is noted to be very independent, as proven even though he is friendly towards Russia, he does not give much room for him when they discuss. He has a complicated relationship with Greece, but recently has united with him on the conflict with Turkey and Macedonia when the latter tends to have trouble over historical claims. He is voiced by Go Inoue in Japanese and by Justin Pate in English.

==== Czechia and Slovakia ====
Czech (チェコ, Cheko) is a young female nation who, along with her male companion Slovakia (スロバキア, Surobakia), worked to break away and achieve independence from Austria and Hungary (then the Austro-Hungarian Empire). Together they lived in the same house as Czechoslovakia (Czecho-Slovakia) and attempted to reestablish their vanishing culture after years of always being ruled by other countries. Czech is artistic, serious, and hard-working while Slovakia is more laid-back and very patient. He also has the habit of becoming obsessed with little issues (like adding a hyphen to their name). After years of begging Czech to add a hyphen to their name, Czech decided to move out and become her own country, to which Slovakia agreed (referencing the "Velvet Divorce" in which they both gained independence from each other without any bloodshed). Czech is shown to have a friendly rivalry with Hungary as they both compete over who deserves to be known as the spa country. They made their debut appearance in Hetalia: World☆Stars chapter 85. Czech Republic is voiced by Sumire Morohoshi and Slovakia is voiced by Yūsuke Kobayashi in Japanese.

==== Romania ====
Romania (ルーマニア, Rūmania) has been described as a friendly, cheerful, and mischievous man who does not get along well with Hungary; their relationship is described like "Cats and Dogs". He is known to have a strong belief in black magic and to have a love for folklore, such as Ileana Cosânzeana, which brings out his romantic side. It is said that his strong points are magic and good luck charms as revealed through character notes. Romania believes himself to be one of Rome's grandsons and an Italy brother due to his time of being Roman territory; he reads tarot cards to prove this but they say otherwise. He first appeared in the Gakuen Hetalia strip "Carry On, Newspaper Club!", in which he is shown to be in the Magic Club with England. He later appeared in Hetalia: The Beautiful World in an animated version of the same strip and in chapter 163 of Hetalia: World☆Stars. He is voiced by Takuya Kodama in Japanese and by Chad Cline in English.

==== Moldova ====
Moldova (モルドバ, Morudoba) is Romania's younger brother. He is a small boy with shaggy brown hair. He wears a small top hat on the left side of his head and usually can be seen dressed in a shabby, oversized coat that's torn and patched up. He first appears in the story "In Just Two Minutes, You Can Grasp The Exterior of the European Economy" on a map describing the economic climate of Europe at the time. He is shown with a vague design collapsed on the ground stating that "They say there's a limit even to low incomes". Moldova, however, is often under pressure of Russia, who wants him to remain with Russia, while Moldova himself is very unhappy of Russia due to the problem of Transnistria. Moldova is very poor and often has to work and pay bills and debts for Russia, Ukraine and Romania. He makes his formal debut in the Halloween 2013 event.

==== Croatia ====
Croatia (クロアチア, Kuroachia) is a minor character. He appeared nameless in the story "Turkey and the EU", asking to join. He appeared shaggy and lightheaded. It was revealed he signed a treaty to become the 28th member of the European Union, and according to Himaruya Hidekaz, he is "the country that makes beautifully ornamented, heart-shaped biscuits and uses them as gifts and even sells them as souvenirs!", which is a common practice in Croatia.

=== Northern Europe ===
==== Nordics ====
Denmark, Norway, Sweden, Finland, and Iceland make up the Nordic countries, also sometimes called the Nordic 5. The five are mostly seen with each other.

===== Denmark =====
Denmark (デンマーク, Denmāku) is a loud and arrogant man who is often seen drinking heavily. He has a fondness for the other Nordics, considering them to be his brothers, especially Iceland and Norway. He considers himself the big brother of all the Nordics though and is often trying to impress them, usually to no avail. He seems to have a fondness for axes; he is often depicted with one in official art and in one strip his plan to help Iceland make new friends involved one (because of this Iceland rejected it, scared of what would happen). Denmark is voiced by Hiroshi Shimozaki in Japanese and Montgomery Sutton (Season 4) and Greg Ayres (Season 5 onwards) in English.

===== Sweden =====
Sweden (スウェーデン, Suwēden) appears to be scary and often unintentionally intimidates those around him (though apparently not Denmark, Norway, or Iceland), although he is actually friendly and even a little shy sometimes. He has a fondness for Finland and once called him his wife, though Finland did not like this. He is the least talkative Nordic, often only speaking one word at a time, though his thoughts tend to be longer and give greater insight into him. He is the tallest Nordic and wears glasses. He seems to have a soft spot for children (or child personifications) judging by the fact he may have adopted Sealand and letting Ladonia think he had actually defeated him. Sweden was once known as the Swedish Empire particularly due to his might and strength until he was defeated by Russia after the Great Northern War. He is often addressed as "Mr. Sweden" by Finland. Sweden is voiced by Keikō Sakai in Japanese and Robert McCollum in English.

===== Norway =====
Norway (ノルウェー, Noruwē) is depicted as a recluse and is revealed to be the brother of Iceland following a DNA test, after which he is intent on getting Iceland to call him "big brother" like how he used to do when he was very young. He is shown to be the only nation other than England and Romania to be able to see spirits and magical creatures. Norway is a magician and once was a Viking, similar to how England was once a pirate. He is very annoyed by Denmark but cares deeply for him. He is protective of Iceland and is shown to care a lot about him. Norway is voiced by Masami Iwasaki in Japanese and Alex Organ in English.

===== Finland =====
Finland (フィンランド, Finrando) is a cheerful young man who has a particular fondness for Christmas because of the belief that Santa Claus lives in Lapland, a major region in northern Finland. During the Christmas events, he is often shown wearing a Santa Claus costume. He and Sweden ran away from Denmark's house together in the past, traveling back to their homes together as well. He and Sweden enjoyed a strong bond until Russia took away Finland and made him under Russia's rule until 1917. Although a bit childish and shy, he demonstrates great bravery when he defeated several attempts by the Soviet Union to attack him during the Winter War in which even Sweden and Germany have recognized and later remains independent despite much of the Soviet Union's pressure. He is occasionally seen interacting with Germany in the WWII-era strips, having been an Axis Power himself. He is a close friend of Estonia with whom he shares ethno-linguistic links and like Estonia is also very high-tech and smart. When he sees Denmark using an iPhone instead of a Nokia, he is shocked and upset. Finland is voiced by Takahiro Mizushima in Japanese and Clint Bickham in English.

===== Iceland =====
Iceland (アイスランド, Aisurando), the younger brother of Norway, is said to have a cool exterior but is hot and passionate inside, a reference to the volcanic nature of the country. He often contemplated his existence when he was very young. All the Nordics tend to treat him like the baby of the family which he deeply dislikes and tends to view himself as the only sane member of their group. Due to the extreme distance between his house and the rest of them, sometimes he feels left out whenever they try to do something as a group, like design a hotel room. Iceland is able to see mythical creatures like Norway, England, and Romania but pretends he cannot so he will not be thought as "the boy who sees things". He is often seen with a puffin named Mr. Puffin that talks like a Mafia boss, puffins being a common bird on the island. Iceland is voiced by Ayumu Asakura in Japanese and Jason Liebrecht in English.

==== The UK Bros ====
England's older brothers who represent the other constituent countries of the United Kingdom. They are Scotland, Wales, and Northern Ireland. They were finally introduced in late 2021 in the web manga after over a decade of just being mentioned with little to go on in the way of appearances or personality. They often argue over a variety of things such who has the tastiest food, the best football/soccer players, and who King Arthur belongs to.

===== Scotland =====
The tallest brother, he is brown-haired with a big, long strand of hair running parallel to his head. Characters notes describe him a being honest, stubborn, straightforward, pragmatic, and earnest. Despite seeming tough and standoffish when talking to England, he is "really a nice and sociable guy". He is also described as being realistic yet believes in supernatural beings and the "unicorn is his friend", a likely reference to the Scottish coat of arms having unicorns in it. When Britain left the EU, he tried to re-join it by himself.

===== Wales =====
The shortest brother, he resembles England the most and has blond hair like him. He seems to be the brother most obsessed with fantastical creatures, especially red dragons, whose mind tends to wander and who seems the least invested in the sibling squabbles they have. Character notes describe him as secretly thinking that he "understands England the most, probably because of the long time they spent together!"

===== Northern Ireland =====
Taller than Wales, but shorter than England, he is the only redhead among the UK Bros and is still one of the few redheaded characters in the series in general. Character notes describe him as friendly, nosy, and unique who occasionally tells sarcastic jokes and does not know when to hang up. He loves "crisps, ice cream, and talking about the weather."

=== Southern Europe ===
==== South Italy ====
Southern Italy (南イタリア, Minami Itaria), often referred to as Romano (ロマーノ, Romāno), is the older brother of Veneziano and is the representation of the southern half of Italy. Romano seems to have a great dislike for everyone although he privately respects Spain, who he lived with when he was young, but hates Germany and is much more openly rude to him. While Romano argues with his younger brother a lot, he is protective of him and thus disapproves of Germany. He is depicted as having a tsundere type of personality and curses frequently. His hair and skin tone are sometimes depicted as darker than his brother's in manga art; this is supposedly due to the fact that Romano has Arabic blood whereas his brother has more German blood. He has been referred to as having "darker hair, darker personality." He acts brave but is actually as timid and fearful as his brother, if not worse, and as a result tends to hide behind the nearest strongest country, even Germany. While he shares his younger brother's love of girls and pasta, he is the tougher and more hardworking of the two, as he was the one who had to work more historically. Romano suffers from an inferiority complex toward his younger brother as Veneziano was more talented in the arts and spent more time by their grandfather's side, so he constantly berates himself. Romano is scared of France and Turkey. Romano is voiced by Daisuke Namikawa in Japanese and by Ian Sinclair in English. Chibiromano is voiced by Aki Kanada in Japanese and by Colleen Clinkenbeard in English.

==== Spain ====
Spain (スペイン, Supein) is a passionate, cheerful man with a mysterious aura of light and darkness and was once very powerful until poverty and war struck; nevertheless, he remained optimistic. Spain loves siesta and is rather relaxed, preferring to do things at his own pace. Spain is shown to be comically incapable of reading the atmosphere and does not even bother to try. He is often seen with France, Belgium, Netherlands and Romano, Italy Veneziano's older brother. Romano spent much time under Spain's rule, where he worked for "Spain the boss". Spain was always affectionate but Romano insulted him at times. Spain is fond of children which leads to his desire to have both parts of Italy in his house. Spain was once married to Austria because of the Habsburgs, but became his enemy during the War of the Spanish Succession, even though he obtained Milan. Netherlands has a difficult relationship with Spain, but it is said that his sister Belgium is on good terms with Spain. Spain is voiced by Go Inoue in Japanese and by David Trosko in English.

==== Greece ====
Greece (ギリシャ, Girisha) is a Mediterranean country who is a lover of cats and philosophy. He is often seen with cats due to his country having so many strays and often has some mannerisms of a cat, such as sleeping for long periods of time and generally being lazy. Due to his country being filled with ruins left by his mother, Ancient Greece, he is unable to develop his country much. He is noted for being a good sailor due to his long coastline. His main rivalry is with Turkey, who invaded him. Greece is voiced by Atsushi Kousaka in Japanese and by Vic Mignogna in English.

==== Portugal ====
Portugal (ポルトガル, Porutogaru) appears to be relatively cheerful and is shown easily chatting with Spain (with whom he has a turbulent history with). He does not show much trepidation about eavesdropping on Spain's "important phone calls" and is known for his laidbackness. While he used to be one of the leading powers during the age of discovery, recently he is become more saudade and focused on domestic issues. His first appearance is as an unnamed and unseen figure at the end of the Halloween 2011 event and made his formal debut in the Halloween 2013 event. Afterwards, he made an appearance in Hetalia: World☆Stars chapter 77, seen criticizing Spain about being late to the Industrial Revolution and bragging about still having his underling Macau while Spain lost South Italy. Portugal is voiced by Yūichirō Umehara in Japanese.

==== Vatican City ====
Vatican City (バチカン市国, Bachikan Shikoku) is the smallest country in the world; his house is located inside of the city of Rome. He is depicted as a grumpy old man who is at constant odds with both Italie's, although it is later resolved. His house suffers from heavy traffic problems due to tourists. He is also noted for dressing like a Pope.

== Asia ==
=== East Asia ===
==== South Korea ====
South Korea (韓国, Kankoku) is a wild and energetic teenager who always claims he is "the origin of everything," which annoys Japan and China. He is also noticed for being famous in music and filming, largely the result of the Korean Wave. He was originally going to make an anime appearance but was removed due to controversy about the portrayal of the character as a negative stereotype of Koreans.

==== Mongolia ====
Mongolia (モンゴル, Mongoru) made his first appearance as a small chibi sketch. Mongolia is described to have terrorized countries such as China, Japan, Hungary, and Russia in their childhoods. He appeared in "The Story about the Early Days of China and Japan."

==== Taiwan ====
Taiwan (台湾) is a fashionable, optimistic and cheerful teenage girl who is strong willed and has a tendency to worry. Most of the time, she is very energetic. Although she has her own culture and a lot of it is very closed to China, she seems to want to get much closer to Japan rather than to China and sometimes feels depressed when China often tries to force her back to his zone. This sometimes makes Taiwan believes China wants to "colonize her." She enjoys the kawaii culture from Japan and likes to cosplay as well. In addition, she is said to be a good cook. She is friendly with Vietnam. Taiwan is voiced by Yuki Kaida in Japanese and by Clarine Harp in English.

==== Hong Kong ====
Hong Kong (香港, Hon Kon) is an administrative region of China. He is a calm teenage boy who likes to play tricks and pranks to annoy China and England. He also enjoys making sarcastic comments. He lived with China before being taken away by England. He calls China "sensei." Recently however, Hong Kong is having tensions with China, which makes their relationship turn sour. Sometimes China feels unhappy about Hong Kong's attitude. Hong Kong is voiced by Motoki Takagi in Japanese and in English by Shelton Windham (Season 4) and Greg Silva (Season 5).

==== Macau ====
Macau (マカオ, Makao) is a city and administrative region of China. He acts like a gentle big brother and wears a pair of glasses. He is shown drinking tea while listening to his sibling's fight. Portugal considers Macau to be his best friend; he even fought the Netherlands over Macau. He is noted for being famous of gambling, which is not legal in China but popular in his place. Unlike Hong Kong's recent tensions with China, Macau tends to be neutral with every affair.

==== Tibet ====
Tibet (チベット, Chibetto) is an autonomous region of China. He is depicted as a young man with monk attire and has a shaved head, referring to Tibetan Buddhist culture. He has only had one non-speaking cameo.

=== Southeast Asia ===
==== Vietnam ====
Vietnam (ベトナム, Betonamu) is a serious and tough woman who often comes across as emotionless even though she is somewhat modest and shy. She seems to be close to Taiwan.

==== Thailand ====
Thailand (タイ, Tai) is a mild young man who always smiles, has the verbal tic "Ana~", speaks politely and formally, and loves Pad Thai and gory horror films. He is often depicted with his pet elephant Toto, though it is very small. Despite being noted as one of the Axis Powers, he has yet to appear in any WWII-era storyline or interact with any of his (former) allies. He is kind and devout, though it is rumored he takes on a Muay Thai stance when someone gets on his bad side. He is said to be super buff, a good gambler, and scary when angered by Philippines. He made two silent cameos in Hetalia: The Beautiful World Episode 3 and 11.

==== Philippines ====
Philippines (フィリピン, Firipin) is a happy, carefree, and energetic young man who carries a selfie stick around with him, as Makati in Metro Manila is considered the "selfie capital" of the world. He owns a pet tarsier named Pien, stated to perch on his shoulder or head to gain maximum attention (unlike actual tarsiers, which are nocturnal and shy). In his debut strip, The Philippines says he hates formal, Western-style meetings and prefers a more relaxed atmosphere. He does not enjoy the stuffy outfits, strict punctuality, stiff greetings at the start, annoying topics, et cetera. Instead, he favors a more laid-back approach more suited to Southeast Asian tastes, for example meeting in a café with casual clothes. The smartphone attached to his selfie stick is designed after those produced by Cherry Mobile, a mobile phone brand from the Philippines.

==== Indonesia ====
Indonesia (インドネシア, Indoneshia) is a friendly and laid back young man who wears an Indonesian National Police outfit with black/dark brown long side fringe hair and a moon orchid in his left pocket. Indonesia is described as often using "where are you going" to start a conversation, and seems to be more casual, unaccustomed to formal settings. He is scared of dark places because he think ghosts may be appear there, and likes sweet foods a lot like other Southeast Asian countries. He is also described as a bit of an airhead and carefree, often saying "Tidak apa-apa" (It's okay) in unpleasant situations. In his debut in chapter 371, he was not identified as Indonesia until chapter 373.

==== Malaysia ====
Malaysia (マレーシア, Marēshia) is a down-to-earth young man whose hair is reminiscent of tigers and wears the Royal Malay Regiment uniform. Malaysia often introduces himself as Singapore's big brother with the latter pretending it is a case of mistaken identity, and is the only country which Singapore is impolite towards after an argument over their water bills.

==== Singapore ====
Singapore (シンガポール, Shingapōru) is a gentle and polite young man who is unexpectedly strong-minded and wears a police uniform and beret. He is friendly towards all other ASEAN countries except Malaysia due to an argument over their water bills. He debuted in Chapter 371 but was not identified until Chapter 374.

=== Western Asia ===
==== Turkey ====
Turkey (トルコ, Toruko) is a country who is recognizable by the fact that he is usually seen wearing a mask around his eyes. Formerly known as the Ottoman Empire, he has a long rivalry with Greece after he invaded him, although he often works with Greece on several issues. Turkey is described as being "unnecessarily passionate and uncomfortably friendly." However, despite his jovial personality, Turkey can be stubborn about trivial things. He is also the only country in the world to recognize the Turkish Republic of Northern Cyprus as a country, whom he currently has custody over. Turkey is voiced by Takahiro Fujimoto in Japanese and Kent Williams in English.

==== Cyprus ====
Cyprus (キプロス, Kipurosu) is an island country in the Eastern Mediterranean Sea. Cyprus first appeared in the independent drama CD Axis Powers Hetalia: The CD. Cyprus appears in the strip Turkey&!, asking Greece why he cannot find a way to get along with Turkey. After pressing the issue, Cyprus asks if there has ever been a time they have had fun together and is surprised to learn that they once had fun in a bathhouse. He is fought over by both Greece and Turkey, though he hopes that they will be able to reach a resolution and get along someday. He openly scolds them for fighting. Cyprus is voiced by Toshiki Kurosawa in Japanese and Aaron Dismuke in English.

==== Turkish Republic of Northern Cyprus ====
Turkish Republic of Northern Cyprus (北キプロス・トルコ共和国, Kita Kipurosu Toruko Kyōwakoku), sometimes referred to as TRNC or Northern Cyprus, appears as a young child and is Cyprus' younger brother. In Axis Powers Hetalia: The CD, it is mentioned that TRNC cannot grow up due to not being recognized as a country by anyone except for Turkey. He greatly admires Turkey because of this. He considers him to be "gentle" and greatly dislikes Greece for always fighting with Turkey. He has a monotone voice and dresses similarly to Turkey, though he is at times confused with Egypt because of their similar design. He is voiced by Hina Minami in Japanese.

=== South Asia ===
==== India ====
India (インド, Indo) is a short, slender man with pale brown skin, dark brown hair parted at the middle, and amber eyes. He is often shown wearing a puce shirt with a Nehru jacket (with a flower pinned to it) and matching churidar trousers. He is shown as a polite man with a flamboyant personality, much like Hungary, and is additionally said to be rather crazy due to the diverse population of the country. He is shown to love elephants as he appears as a member of the Elephant Appreciation Club in the Go Forth! Newspaper Club! Second Half strip along with Thailand. He later appears in the Hetalia of The Dead! strips when England shows the rest of the characters an Indian horror movie mixed with a spontaneous song and dance towards the climax scene (referencing a trope of Bollywood movies), which shocks and confuses everyone. In Volume 5, India is mentioned to be extraordinarily skilled at mathematics and arguing and emits the intense aura of a prince. He is also said to have "going my way" thoughts that overwhelm other countries. India is voiced by Masahisa Sogabe in Japanese and by T. K. Masala in English.

== North America ==
=== Canada ===
Canada (カナダ, Kanada) is the more passive brother of America. He loves maple syrup and has a pet polar bear named Kumajirou who unfortunately always forgets his owner's name, politely asking who he is every time he interacts with him. In return, Canada always forgets Kumajirou's name as well. In contrast to his brother, Canada is calm, shy, sensitive, and hates fighting, but it is said that he is a very strong fighter just like his brother, he even fought America to a draw and helped burn down Washington, D.C. when he was on the side with England (War of 1812). Despite this, he is often mistaken for his brother, has found himself in trouble for incidents that America has caused, and is bullied. When he is not being mistaken for his brother, other nations sometime tend to forget that he exists. Canada and Kumajirou appear at an Allied Forces meeting but due to Canada's invisibility effect, the other Allies do not realize he is there. Despite his shy demeanour and insecurity, he has been shown at times to reveal passive-aggressive inner thoughts and has even berated America once. His hair is wavy and blond. He has violet eyes, though they have also been colored blue in some official art. At least one figurine depicts him with completely orange hair. He also sports a curly ahoge off the top of his head. Canada wears a heavy tan winter coat and pants as his military uniform, though when he is dressed casually, he is usually shown wearing a hoodie (sometimes depicted with the Canadian flag emblem on it), and a pair of jeans. Like his brother, Canada wears glasses, though he also sports a pair of goggles on his head at times (such as when wearing his uniform). In one episode he decides to get a tattoo of a maple leaf to go on his forehead to distinguish himself from America, however this plan is foiled when America slaps an American flag over Canada's new tattoo. He is voiced by Katsuyuki Konishi who also voices America in the anime. In an interview with PASH magazine, Konishi said that he played Canada's voice as very quiet and "barely above a whisper", in contrast to the louder brother. His English voice actor, Eric Vale, also voices America and plays Canada's voice in much the same way.

=== Cuba ===
Cuba (キューバ, Kyūba) is a heavyset man with tan skin and good nature. He makes his debut anime appearance after the credits of Episode 35 and became the first Latin American country to appear. The scene adapts Cuba's initial appearance in Fly, Mr. Canada, Fly. He later appears in Episode 52, this time during the actual episode rather than after the credits. In his debut in Episode 35, Cuba's hair was drawn to be worn in dreadlocks, but in Episode 52, his hair is shown to be straight. He also appears in the film Hetalia: Axis Powers: Paint it, White as one of the few countries not to be transformed by the Pict. He is featured in a news report showcasing him alongside Canada as they attempt to help humans who have only partially been converted into Pict. He has not had a good relationship with America much. Meanwhile, he is seriously poor and often has to pay debts to America. He is voiced by Hiroki Takahashi in Japanese and Bob Carter in English.

=== Mexico ===
Although Mexico (メキシコ, Mekishiko) has not made any actual appearance in the series or on Himaruya's blog, Mexico is mentioned many times by other nations, mostly America. When asked if he plans on making Mexico, Himaruya responded that he indeed has plans to design Mexico and other Latin American nations. While missing a design, Mexico is still present in the series. They are mentioned in the "America and the World Map" strip where America explains to England why Mexico on his map is "half-assed", stating that "It's because of my grudge over the Alamo". Mexico is also mentioned in Lithuania's drama CD adaption of "Lithuania's Out-Sourcing" where America expresses, he is running late for a meeting but since it is with Mexico, he wants to wear a more "casual" tie. In Episode 9 of the Comic Birz volumes, Kumajirou responds to Mexico's email on advice to better their public safety by telling him to add more Canada.

== Africa ==
=== Egypt ===
He is a quiet, mysterious young man who seems stubborn, but is actually friendly and family minded. His mother, Ancient Egypt, knew Rome. Egypt appears in Hetalia: Axis Powers when he is invaded by Italy (a reference to Italy's invasion of northeast Africa during the Second World War) yet he manages to keep his land and whacks Italy on the head with a stick in revenge despite being in Germany's presence. Egypt has light brown skin and wears a khaki uniform. His head is covered with a white keffiyeh. In some artwork, he is depicted with an Anubis-like creature and in one sketch, appears to know magic.

=== Cameroon ===
He has made few official appearances outside of sketches and images posted on Bamboo Thicket. It is revealed in his profile in Volume 3 that he owns a pet lion cub named Kokolo (ココロ, Kokoro). He enjoys soccer to a great extent, and he even stopped to play soccer with some children on Christmas despite being dressed in nice clothing. In a Christmas 2011 event strip, Cameroon decides to teach a mouse lemur to play soccer, further demonstrating his interest in the sport. Himaruya has stated that the country's football image is strong. During the Halloween 2011 event, it is revealed that Cameroon is unused to the idea of Halloween and quickly gives up in trying to participate. Cameroon appears as a dark-skinned male with brown hair in a crop-top style. He has sunburns at the edges of his ears and there is an obvious cross-shaped shave at the right side of his head. He also has hazelnut eyes and dons a pair of neatly looking glasses.

=== Seychelles ===
Seychelles is described as a country girl with a big heart who can sometimes be sloppy. She cannot cook on her own and laments over her high cost of living. She first appeared as the main character in the demo dating sim Gakuen Hetalia. Seychelles has long, dark brown hair tied into two pigtails with red ribbons. She wears a knee-length blue dress with puffed sleeves which sometimes is drawn with a flower-print. In some appearances, Seychelles is shown holding a large fish. She usually has brown eyes, though when she appeared in a cameo in the fifth Noto-sama game, her eyes were blue.

== Oceania ==
=== Australia ===
Australia (オーストラリア, Ōsutoraria) is depicted in the manga as a cheerful, big brother like character. He is the big brother of Wy and Hutt River. Due to his name sounding somewhat like Austria's, his hair is similar to Austria's although having two ahoges instead of one. He has a band-aid across his nose and is often depicted with an evil-looking koala. He appears in an episode of Hetalia: Beautiful World when the Gauken Hetalia newspaper club (made up of the Axis Powers) interviews the swimming club which he is a member of. He always wears an ANZAC uniform, a reference to the Gallipoli Campaign of the ANZACs. Like New Zealand, he loves playing rugby union. He is voiced by Keiichiro Asai in Japanese and by Tyson Rinehart in English.

=== New Zealand ===
New Zealand (ニュージーランド, Nyū Jīrando) has light brown hair styled in a short curly bob with spiral-shaped ahoges on each side of his head. He has England-like bushy eyebrows. New Zealand is usually depicted with a cheerful manner and seems to have a good relationship with England. New Zealand makes a non-speaking cameo in the Hetalia: The Beautiful World episode "Hetalia of the Dead - First Part," standing behind England, who is seated. He has brownish hair with ram-like curls at the sides of his head. He wears a yellowish shirt, beige pants, and brown shoes. He is noticed for being very good at playing rugby union, which is New Zealand's number one favorite sport. He makes his speaking debut in the following episode, "Hetalia of the Dead - Second Part". He is voiced by Souma Maeda in Japanese and by Anthony Bowling in English.

=== Tonga ===
Tonga (トンガ) makes a non-speaking cameo in the Halloween 2011 event dressed as a sheep along with Australia and New Zealand.

== South America ==
=== Ecuador ===
Ecuador's (エクアドル, Ekuadoru) design came from a request and was posted on Himaruya's blog. He is the first South American nation to receive a design. He is an animal lover who owns many alpacas. He has tanned skin and wears a bowler type hat and a poncho. It is unknown if he will appear in the series.

=== Brazil ===
Brazil (ブラジル, Burajiru) made his first debut in Hetalia: World☆Stars Chapter 556 during the run of World☆Stars: Gangsta. He has tan skin, dark hair and somewhat sharp teeth. Himaruya has said Brazil would be optimistic like India and China.

== Historic Personifications ==
=== Prussia ===
Prussia (プロイセン, Puroisen) is the older brother of Germany and the other States of Germany. He is a militant man shown having white hair, very pale skin, and reddish eyes. He is often shown with a little yellow bird named that the fandom has dubbed 'Gilbird' that is used as a messenger (similar to a messenger pigeon). He is shown as a wild country who is always involved in wars in order to gain power and has a fondness for agitating Austria, which causes him to be attacked by Hungary even in the modern day. He once represented the Teutonic Knights, but eventually became Prussia after various stages in his life as a nation and in modern-day he represents the former East Germany and the present region of eastern Germany Although one of the best-known catchphrases pertaining to him is the 'vital regions' catchphrase (due to its inadvertent sexual double-meaning), the first country to coin this was actually Austria in the webcomic Maria Theresa and the War of the Austrian Succession, when he said:

Prussia has occupied my vital regions! Summon the soldiers, they must be re-taken immediately!

— Austria (webcomic)

The phrase "vital regions" is a euphemism for the province of Silesia, which was acquired by the Kingdom of Prussia in 1741 during the War of the Austrian Succession. However, despite its popularity amongst fans, the phrase "vital regions" was removed from the English dubbed anime, which instead used the phrase 'manly tract of land':

My manly tract of land has been occupied by that demon-douche Prussia!

— Austria (English-dubbed anime)

Although Prussia is very vain and proud and often says he is the best, calling himself "ore-sama" (usually translated as "The Awesome Me") even in his diary, he has a lonely side that is rarely shown. His favorite boss of all is Frederick II of Prussia, also known as Frederick the Great, or affectionately Old Fritz, whom he fought for in the Silesian Wars against Austria. Prussia thus likes to tease Austria and Hungary but is almost afraid of the latter due to their past hardships. However, he showed to care for her and even became embarrassed when he found out she was actually a woman. Later, it is stated by Hungary that he was raised by men only, what would explain his reaction towards women. His characteristic laugh is "kesese!". He is voiced by Atsushi Kousaka in Japanese and Jonathan Brooks in English.

=== Ancient Egypt ===
Ancient Egypt (古代エジプト, Kodai Ejiputo) is the mother of Egypt, who had a romantic aura of mystery about her. Rome is said to have fallen in love with her at first sight though she is speculated not to have returned his interest. Her pyramids and artifacts still attract archaeologists from all around the world. She makes multiple appearances in Hetalia: World☆Stars arguing with Rome or admiring cats. She received her own chapters in which she talks about the gods and her doubts in one of her pharaohs.

=== Ancient Greece ===
Ancient Greece (古代ギリシャ, Kodai Girisha) is the mother of Greece, described as having been relatively laid-back and easygoing. However, when she fought, she is said to have been "scary." Ancient Greece had a troubling internal struggle, which can be compared to that of Japan's feudal clans. Rome fell in love with both her and Ancient Egypt at first sight. In Axis Powers Hetalia: The CD, she is also referred to as Byzantine Empire and it is said that Turkey had feelings for her as well before conquering and killing her and taking the young Greece for himself.

=== Ancient Rome ===
Ancient Rome (ローマ帝国, Rōma Teikoku), called Grandpa Rome by Italy, but also referenced as Roma Antiqua and the Roman Empire, is the grandfather to both Italy and Romano. Like both Italies, Rome is somewhat lazy, gluttonous, and is a womanizer. However, Italy seems to take after him more in both appearance and the fact that Rome is somewhat bubble-headed. Rome was somewhat surprised when he discovered that Germany knew of him and admired him which made Rome like him much more. Other relationships that Rome had were with Germania, the grandfather of Holy Rome, Prussia, and Germany, who was once his bodyguard but apparently killed Rome later on, and also with Ancient Greece, the mother of Greece, and Ancient Egypt, the mother of Egypt, both of whom he fell in love with. He is voiced by Hozumi Gōda in Japanese, and by Christopher Sabat in English.

=== Persian Empire ===
Persian Empire (ペルシア, Perushia) or Persia, comes off as a bit antagonistic towards Rome and they have a strong rivalry. Persia always gloats to Rome about capturing his boss, Emperor Valerian. He seems carefree but has endured a lot during his life. These hardships resulted in his "self-assured" personality. He represents the Sasanian Empire along with the other early Persian Empires like the Achaemenid Empire and the Parthian Empire. He is similar to Rome in that he has grandchildren who have taken his place; he was shown with a child which is believed to be a young country (most likely Iran).

=== Germania ===
Germania (ゲルマン, Geruman) is the representation of the Germanic Tribes (though it is believed by some that he may instead be intended to represent the region Germania) and the father/grandfather of the Germanic Nations. He is often shown with a blank emotionless expression and very little is known about him, other than speculation, such as him being a brutal warrior. For a while, he acted as Rome's bodyguard, but slowly grew to hate him. However, they are often seen together hanging out, even to the point where Rome told Germania to keep smiling until he got there (something that was a physical impossibility). He often puts up with Rome's antics, and when Rome said he had a problem, Germania told him advice to help him and ways, but is visibly unamused and annoyed. In the Japanese anime, he is voiced by Kishô Taniyama, and in the English version he is voiced by Jason Douglas.

=== Holy Roman Empire ===
Holy Roman Empire (神聖ローマ, Shinsei Rōma) is only seen in the Chibitalia segment of the show and has a resemblance of a younger Germany. At first, Holy Rome takes Italy and forces him to become part of the empire. Throughout the series, Holy Rome tries to unite with Italy, and develops a crush on him, though he thought that Italy was a girl the entire time. He leaves to fight in a war and then disappears. His fate has not yet been disclosed, although Himaruya has stated that he and Italy will "have a happy ending." There is a long running fan debate about whether or not Holy Rome, after being wounded in a battle by France, lost his memory, was then raised by Prussia, and grew up to be Germany. He is voiced by Jun Konno in Japanese and Chris Cason in English.

=== Knights Templar ===
Knights Templar (テンプル騎士団, Tenpuru Kishidan) is an old friend and comrade of Prussia's. He is a very kind young man and believes that treating everything and everyone with love will allow you to touch their hearts. He is also a very talented singer; he attracts everyone's attention when he sings. He seems to care a lot for Prussia, but Prussia seems to be annoyed by him and attempts to push him away.

== Micronations ==
=== Sealand ===
Sealand (シーランド, Shīrando) is an old abandoned British fort in the sea that now claims itself as an independent country. However, nobody recognizes Sealand as a nation in his own right. As a result, he has to try other ways of getting noticed. For example, he once went to a meeting disguised as Canada. In the film Paint it, White, Sealand is shown that he has the ability to run across water and jump great heights, being able to jump from sea-level to his platform in a single leap. He refers to England as "jerk England" or "British jerk". He is voiced by Ai Orikasa in Japanese and Maxey Whitehead in English. Older Sealand is voiced by Aaron Dismuke in English.

=== Seborga ===
Seborga (セボルガ, Seboruga) is a micronation resembling and related to the two Italy brothers. Seborga declared his independence many centuries ago but no one recognizes him as a state due to his passive nature. He is even more of a womanizer than Veneziano and Romano. He is a young teenager who resembles both Veneziano and Romano; he has a wiry and bent hair curl similar to theirs and has a skin tone that falls between Veneziano's fair complexion and Romano's olive complexion. In the few sketches of him, Seborga is often depicted with an inner tube floaty. He is friendly with Sealand and is the first to join Sealand's club of micronations. He is also shown to like Wy, commenting that she was cute and that he might hit on her when she gets older. He has tried to hit on Monaco, though he had to defeat her in a game of poker. He failed but they went out anyway. He makes his anime appearance in the episode "Keep on moving!! March Forward, Sealand!", which adapts the Volume 4 manga strip of the same name. He is voiced by Hiroshi Okamoto in Japanese, and by Austin Tindle in English.

=== Wy ===
Wy (ワイ, Wai) is a young female micronation residing in Australia. Wy is an artistic character who tries to act mature. Being a hostile character, she tends to act coldly to other characters, including other micronations, only following them out of boredom. Her main relation is Hutt River, an older, more developed micronation who acts as her senior. Unlike Sealand, she is recognized as a nation by some people, including local towns, but not by other nations. She claims to be in the books "all official-like." Her behavior is shown to reflect the philosophy of the Prince of Wy, Paul Delprat. She makes her anime debut in Hetalia: The Beautiful World in the episode "Keep on moving!! March Forward, Sealand!", which adapts the Volume 4 manga strip of the same name. She is voiced by Mikako Komatsu in Japanese and by Lindsay Seidel in English.

=== Molossia ===
Molossia (モロッシア, Morosshia) is a teenage male micronation from Nevada, United States. On his own he is calm and enjoys gardening. However, when in the presence of others, Molossia instantly turns aggressive and foul-mouthed. He is often seen swearing and giving middle finger signs to other nations and micronations. He is usually seen wearing a military jacket slung over his shoulders, a gold chain around his neck, and an unusual hairstyle which is a combination of a mohican and a pompadour. His mobster-like appearance is likely a reference to Las Vegas's (and to a lesser extent, Reno's) history of organized crime in the past and the stereotypes associated with it. He is voiced by Kaito Ishikawa in Japanese and by Cris George in English.

=== Hutt River ===
Hutt River (ハット・リバー, Hatto Ribā) is a teenage male micronation living in Australia. He acts as the senior to Wy and is seen as being more developed than the other micronations, living in a clean, organized state and trying to come across as important. For example, he usually only allows someone to speak to him if they own a Rolls-Royce, and when visiting him you have to pay a visa costing two Hutt River dollars. He is usually seen wearing a bow tie, a large cloak and a striped sash. He is voiced by Masatomo Nakazawa in Japanese and by David Matranga in English.

=== Kugelmugel ===
Kugelmugel (クーゲルムーゲル, Kūgerumūgeru) is a young male micronation from Austria, who describes him as being "eccentric." Kugelmugel is obsessed with art and believes that most things are art, including declaring his independence. Thus, he is usually seen by other countries running around exclaiming "It's art! It's art!" He is usually seen wearing a red beret, a waistcoat with a striped shirt and bow tie, shorts, and with long braids in his hair. He is voiced by Mitsuhiro Ichiki in Japanese and by Clifford Chapin in English.

=== Ladonia ===
Ladonia (ラドニア, Radonia) is a young male micronation living with Sweden but based on the internet. Ladonia is hot-headed, claiming to be powerful enough to take on Sweden, to be extremely popular, and upon meeting the other micronations orders them to obey him, often acting hostile towards Sealand. He is usually seen with a computer or a games console and can sometimes end up trapped inside computers. Ladonia has a scar across his face which according to in the manga is really just paint and wears a long coat with a golden apple pinned on it. He is voiced by Daiki Yamashita in Japanese and by Justin Briner in English.

=== Slowjamastan ===
Slowjamastan (スロージャマスタン, Surōjamasutan) is a young male micronation who has a wild personality. He is also the youngest of the micronations, due to his real life counterpart being established in late 2021. Despite this, he's described as being kinda tall. He looks up to Molossia, who he calls Big Brother. In his biography it's stated he attends MicroCon in addition to Comic-Con. Slowjamastan has light blonde hair with sunglasses and blue eyes. He wears a teal jacket with a white shirt underneath, black pants with red highlights and red shoes with black highlights. He is notable for having fangs like a raccoon.

=== Aerican Empire ===
Aerican Empire (アエリカ帝国, Aerikan Teikoku) is a young male micronation. He's notably interested in planets and he is said to have territories in Canada, Australia, Mars, Pluto, and some fictional planets. He has reddish brown hair with a curly ahoge similar to Canada's. He has red eyes. He wears a black peacoat underneath a cape. He is usually seen with a smiley face next to him, in reference to the Aerican Empire's flag which has a smiley face on it. Sometimes the smiley face leaves on its own.
