= Mawson (surname) =

Mawson is a surname of both English and Scottish origin it is also prevalent in the Isle of Man. Notable people with the surname include:

- Alfie Mawson (born 1994), English footballer
- Andrew Mawson (disambiguation), multiple people
- Douglas Mawson (1882–1958), Australian geologist and Antarctic explorer, husband of Paquita
- Gary Mawson (born 1963), American darts player
- Joe Mawson (1905–1959), English footballer
- Paquita Mawson (1891–1974), Australian community worker and author, wife of Douglas Mawson
- Patricia M. Mawson (1915–1999), Australian zoologist and parasitologist, daughter of Douglas and Paquita Mawson
- Thomas Mawson (1861–1933), British garden designer and landscape architect
- William Mawson (1828–1889), British architect
