= Mawson (disambiguation) =

Douglas Mawson (1882–1958) was an Australian geologist and Antarctic explorer.

Mawson may also refer to:

== People ==
- Mawson (surname)

== Places ==
=== Antarctic ===
- Mawson Coast, Antarctic coast
- Mawson Peak, a volcano on Heard Island
- Mawson Station, an Antarctic base
- Mawson Sea, Antarctic sea
- Mawson's Huts, historic Antarctic site

=== Australia ===
- Electoral district of Mawson, an electorate for the South Australian House of Assembly
- Mawson, Australian Capital Territory, a suburb in Canberra
- Mawson Plateau, a plateau in the Flinders Ranges of South Australia
- Mount Mawson, a mountain in the Mount Field National Park in Tasmania, Australia

=== Other places ===
- Mawson (state), a historic Shan state in present-day Burma

== Other uses ==
- Antarctic cod, a fish sometimes known as Mawson's cod
- Mawson Gallery, the former name of the Australian Polar Collection at the South Australian Museum, Adelaide
- Mawson Trail, a cycling trail in South Australia
- SS Douglas Mawson, an Australian steamer that disappeared in a cyclone in 1923
