= List of Archibald Prize 1966 finalists =

This is a list of finalists for the 1966 Archibald Prize for portraiture, listed by Artist and Title. As the images are copyright, an external link to an image has been listed where available.

Artist	Title	Subject	Notes
Harold Abbott	Gino Preziosa		
Ian Armstrong	John Kennedy, FRAM		
William Aylward	Sue		
Peter Alan Bill	Professor Bissietta		
William Geoffrey Boissevain	Sir Stanley Prescott		
Shirley Bourne	Mrs. Lorna Moore		
Mary Brady	Sir Bernard Heinze		
Florence Broadhurst	Self-portrait		
Ernest Buckmaster	Self-portrait		
Charles Bush	Self-portrait at 47		
Donald Cameron	Self-portrait		
Reg Campbell	Self-portrait		
Jack Carington Smith	Sir Douglas Parker, OBE		
Judy Cassab	Peter O'Shaughnessy as Dylan		
Paul Delprat	Lady Paquita Mawson		
Desmond Digby	Margaret Carnegie with orange dress and specs		image
Shirley Eustis	Mr William Frater		
Maximilian Feuerring	Self-portrait		
Robert Finlayson	Viidika		
Margaret Fromel	Ted		
Sam Fullbrook	Norman Behan		image
Don Gallagher	Joanne Dowell		
Edna Garran-Brown	Portrait of an artist		
Hector Gilliland	Self-portrait		
Thomas Gleghorn	Louis James		
Pat Graham	Irvine Douglas		
Robert Greer	Miss Togo		
Guy Grey-Smith	Self-portrait		
Henry Aloysius Hanke	Self-portrait		
David Harrison	Dr. J. D. Bollen, B.A., Ph.D.		
Newton Hedstrom	Lindsay Bryant		
Sali Herman	Self-portrait		
Graeme Inson	Valli		
Graeme Inson	Roderick Shaw		
Jean Isherwood	John Coburn		
Gareth Jones-Roberts	Alan Marshall		
Louis Kahan	Dr TS Gregory		
Garrett Kingsley	Self-portrait		
Michael Kmit	Eddy Batache		
Lynette Lee	Roderick		image
Vaike Liibus	Edwin Hodgeman		
Olive Long	Miss Nancy Salas		
Herbert McClintock	Captain Major		
Jocelyn Maughan	Lyndon Dadswell		
Vladas Meskenas	Michael Kmit		
Lesley Moline	John Thornett, MBE, BSc, BE		
Jon Molvig	Charles Blackman		image Winner: Archibald Prize 1966
Jon Molvig	Sir Charles Moses		
Arthur J Murch	Alan Ingham		
Meg Padgham	John Casson, O.B.E.		
Colin Parker	Lindsay Imbandarinja		
William Pidgeon	Professor Sir Philip Baxter, KBE, PhD		
William Pidgeon	Mrs W Bunning		
Gwen Pratt	JF Fleming		
Clifton Pugh	Sir Macfarlane Burnet		
David Rae	Valerie Maikus		
David Rae	Esther Edmundsen		image
John Thomas Rigby	George Wallace		
Andrew Sibley	June Bronhill		
Eric John Smith	Rodney Milgate		image
Eric John Smith	Self-portrait		
Joshua Smith	Capt. Neville Bruchauser		
Joshua Smith	Sir George Currie, BScAgr, DSc, HonLLD, HonLittD		
Arnold St Claire	Dr Maurice Pozniak, M.B., B.S.		
C G Taylor	Robert D Fitzgerald		
Dora Toovey	The Rev. J. Gray Robertson, O.B.E., B.A., B.D.		
Thora Ungar	Sydney Ungar		
Douglas Watson	Roland Wakelin		
Dick Weight	Ward Austin		
Bryan Westwood	Mervyn Horton		
Reinis Zusters	Myself		

== See also ==
- List of Archibald Prize winners
- Lists of Archibald Prize finalists
