= Paul Delprat =

Australian artist

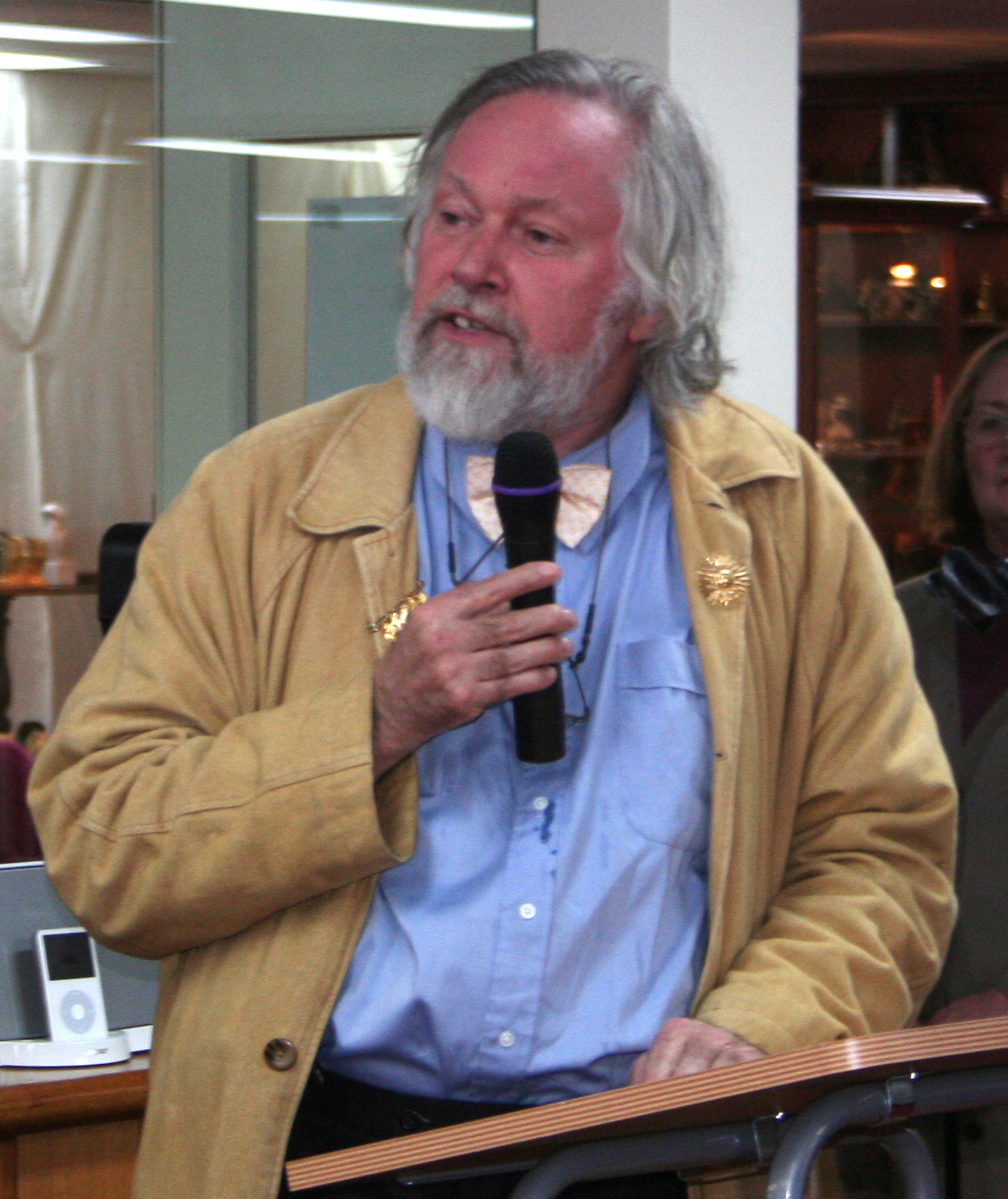
- Paul Delprat in 2011

Prince of Wy
- Reign: 15 November 2004 – present
- Predecessor: Principality established
- Full name: Paul Ashton Delprat
- Born: 1942 (age 83–84); Sydney, Australia

Paul Ashton Delprat (born 1942) is an Australian artist and teacher. As of 2025 he is the principal of the Julian Ashton Art School in Sydney, New South Wales. His work is represented in state, municipal, and university galleries as well as numerous private collections. He is the self-proclaimed "prince" of his "Principality of Wy" in Mosman, Sydney.

== Early life and education ==
Paul Ashton Delprat was born in Sydney, Australia, in 1942. He is the grandson of Julian Howard Ashton (known as Howard), great-grandson of Julian Ashton and on one side and of Guillaume Daniel Delprat on the other.

Delprat attended Sydney Grammar School.

He first painted with his grandfather, Howard Ashton, and later with Henry C. Gibbons and his uncle J. Richard Ashton at the Julian Ashton Art School, where he gained a diploma. He also did some study in galleries in London and Paris.

== Career ==
In the mid-1960s Delprat taught art at the Australian International Independent School in Sydney.

In 1967 he was appointed senior art master at Newington College and in 1970 he performed in the cast of the school's production of The Tempest. Produced by an English master, Max Iffland, it was staged in the style of the rock musical Hair, with original music composed by students John Taberner and Crispin Dye.

In 1971 he began teaching at the University of Sydney and later at the University of New South Wales. He became the Principal of the Julian Ashton Art School in 1988. In 1990 he initiated the scholarship program at the school.

As of 2025 he is principal of the Julian Ashton Art School.

=== Illustrator ===
Delprat has published illustrations in the Sydney Morning Herald, The Bulletin, and Quadrant, and has illustrated numerous Penguin Books.

=== Film ===
For the 1969 motion picture Age of Consent, starring Helen Mirren and James Mason, directed by Michael Powell, Delprat created paintings, drawings, and sculptures. In 1994, he created the paintings and drawings for Sirens, another Lindsay-inspired film, starring Elle Macpherson, Portia de Rossi, and Sam Neill.

== Other activities ==
As of September 2025 Delprat is patron of the Mosman Art Society and Portrait Artists Australia.

He is an associate of the Royal Art Society of New South Wales, and has acted as a judge of several art awards.

== Recognition and awards ==
During his student years Delprat won the Waratah Festival sculpture and drawing prizes, as well as the Henry Gibbons, Phillip Muskett, and Le Gay Brereton prizes.

Delprat's portrait of Lady Paquita Mawson (née Delprat) was a finalist in the 1966 Archibald Prize. His work has been selected for the Sulman Prize and Wynne exhibitions.

He was Mosman Citizen of the Year in 1996, and has received an award for bushcare from Mosman Council..

== Collections ==
Delprat's work is held in the collections of the National Gallery of Australia and the BHP collections. Delprat has held many solo in Sydney and has also shown in all Australian state capitals and London.

His portrait of Banjo Paterson hangs in the Banjo Paterson Library at Sydney Grammar School; his portrait of Rodney Seaborn at the Rodney Seaborn Library at the National Institute of Dramatic Art; and his portrait of Lady Paquita Mawson in the Barr Smith Library at the University of Adelaide.

== Principality of Wy ==
In 1993 Delprat applied to Mosman Council to build a driveway over an unmade road near Wyargine Reserve, to provide access to his property. The proposal was controversial because the road reserve had been zoned environmentally-protected bushland by the council. Delprat's plans were approved in principle, but he encountered bureaucratic errors which had to be remedied by the local council. After 11 years, the council finally rejected the application, whereupon, in a ceremony at Mosman Town Hall on 15 November 2004, the mayor, in full regalia, accepted Deplrat's declaration of the secession from Mosman of his property, styled the "Principality of Wy". Delprat has adopted the title "Prince Paul of Wy". He calls his "principality" an "ongoing creative installation".
