= Principality of Wy =

Micronation in Australia

- Micronation (unrecognised entity)
- Location: Mosman, New South Wales, Australia
- Claimed by: Paul Delprat
- Dates claimed: 15 November 2004–present

The Principality of Wy is a claimed micronation in Australia, located in the Sydney suburb of Mosman. In 2004 artist Paul Delprat claimed to secede from Mosman and develop his own micronation in response to a lengthy dispute with the local governing body, Mosman Council. After 20 years of seeking planning permission, he lost his appeal in 2013.

== History ==
In 1993 the Delprat family applied to build a driveway to their house over an unbuilt road, leading to a long-running battle with the Mosman council that they eventually lost. Eventually, on 15 November 2004, Paul Delprat claimed to secede from Mosman, although not from Australia, claiming that he was a prince of the Principality of Wy.

The community has been noted by international and local news outlets, including Sky News, The Daily Telegraph UK, The Sydney Morning Herald, The Daily Telegraph (Sydney), The National (Abu Dhabi) and the Kuwait Times. However, there is still no local, national or international recognition of the community.

Delprat attended the first Australian conference of micronation leaders on Dangar Island in 2010, which was sponsored by Macquarie University.

== Contribution to the arts ==
The community is an active patron of art and sponsors an art prize. Representatives from the principality have also been invited to open exhibitions and give talks in the local community and throughout the state. Art reviews and articles have appeared in art society newsletters and are published on the Principality of Wy website in support of local and renowned artists. Private exhibitions are held within the principality by invitation and public exhibitions are open at the embassy in Georges Heights, featuring works by new and emerging artists.

== In popular culture ==
Wy is a character in the Japanese web comic, manga, and anime series Hetalia: Axis Powers about anthropomorphic nations and micronations. Wy is depicted as a young girl of small stature who has been stated to be artistically gifted. On 13 September 2010, Prince Paul of Wy posted a painting on his blog of the character. While there was originally no direct reference to Hetalia in the post itself, it is likely that he was informed of the character's existence. Later, the post was updated naming the series itself.
