= Kugelmugel =

Micronation in Vienna, Austria

Coordinates: 48°12′56″N 16°23′46″E

Republic of Kugelmugel Republik Kugelmugel (German)
- Micronation (unrecognized entity)
- Area claimed: 94 square metres (1,010 sq ft)
- Claimed by: Edwin Lipburger (1976); Nikolaus Lipburger (2015); Linda Treiber (2022)
- Dates claimed: 19 December 1976–present

Kugelmugel, officially the Republic of Kugelmugel (German: Republik Kugelmugel), is a spherical art object located in Vienna, Austria.

It came about as the result of the artist Edwin Lipburger constructing the 8 meter diameter spherical object without permissions from the authorities in Austria. After the dispute between the artist and authorities, the artist declared it a micronation, and it was eventually granted asylum by the then-mayor Helmut Zilk in Vienna where it is housed in the Prater park.

The 'Republic' is currently administered by Linda Treiber as president.

== History ==
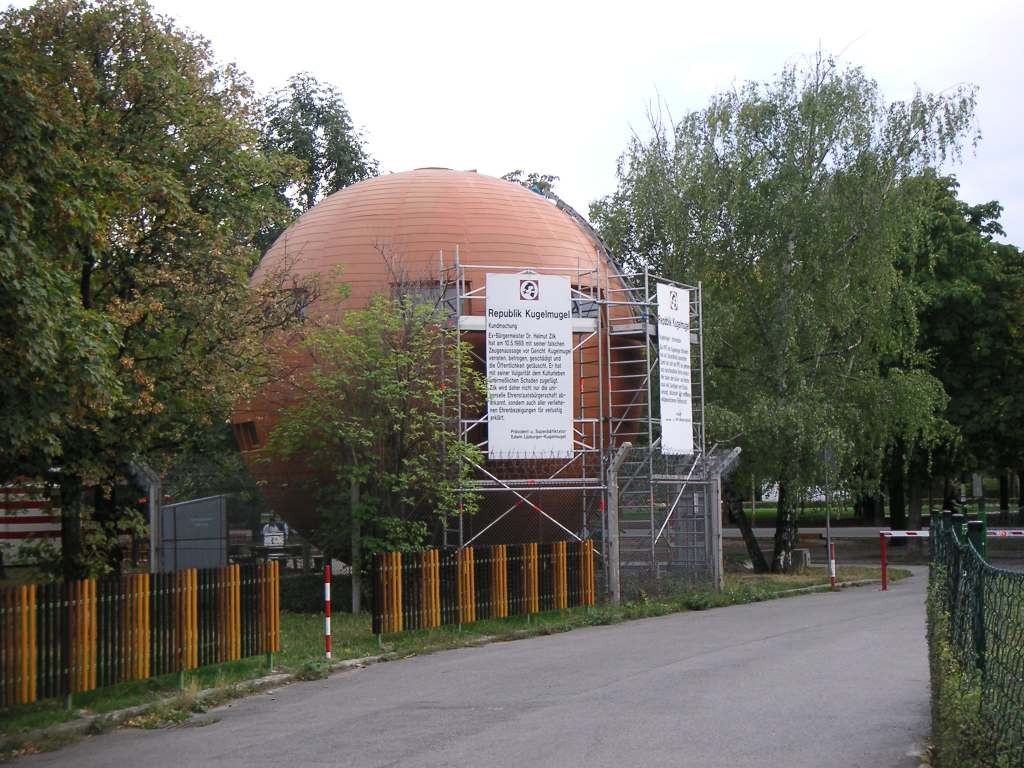
The Republic of Kugelmugel

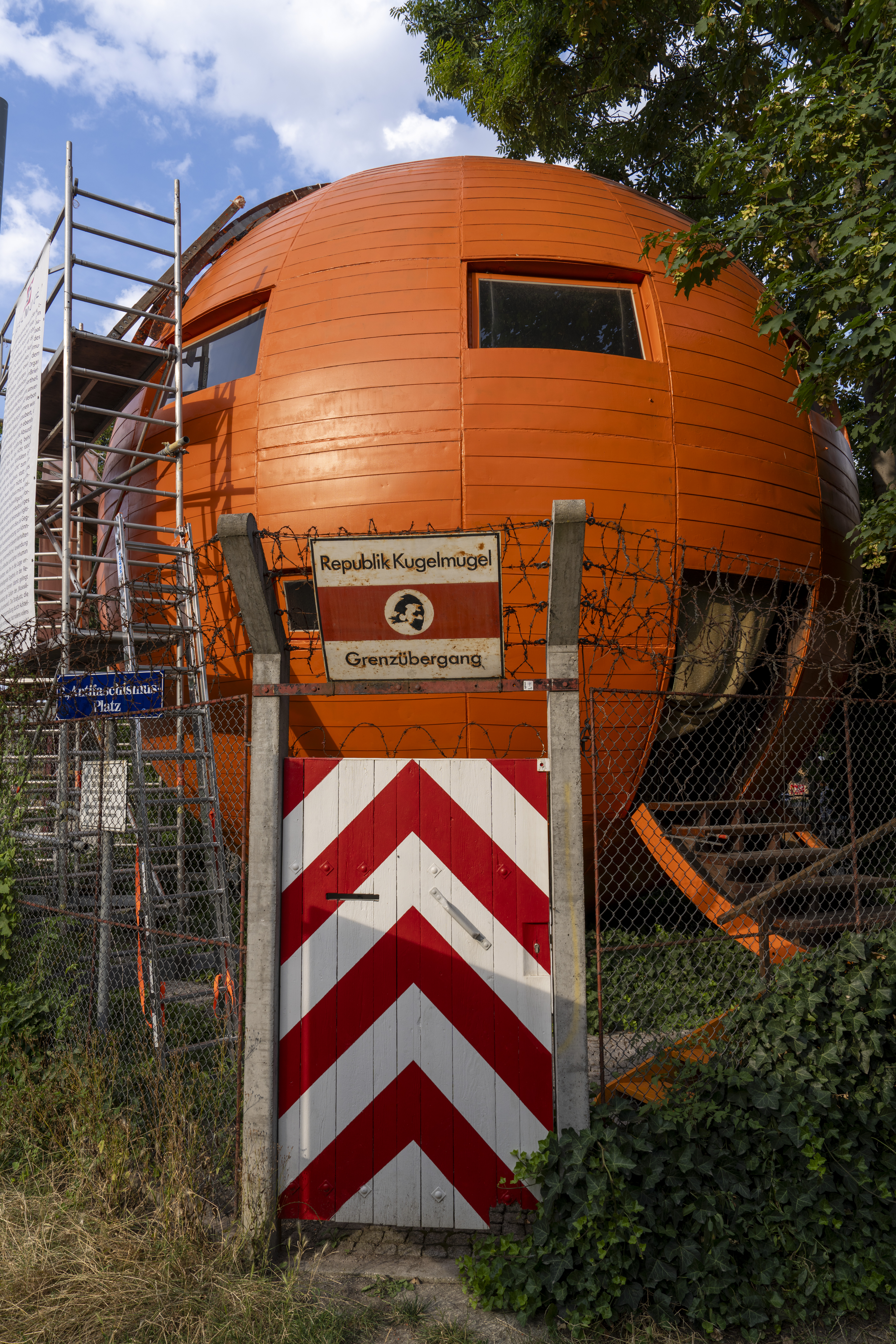
Front entrance with sign for border crossing (2024)

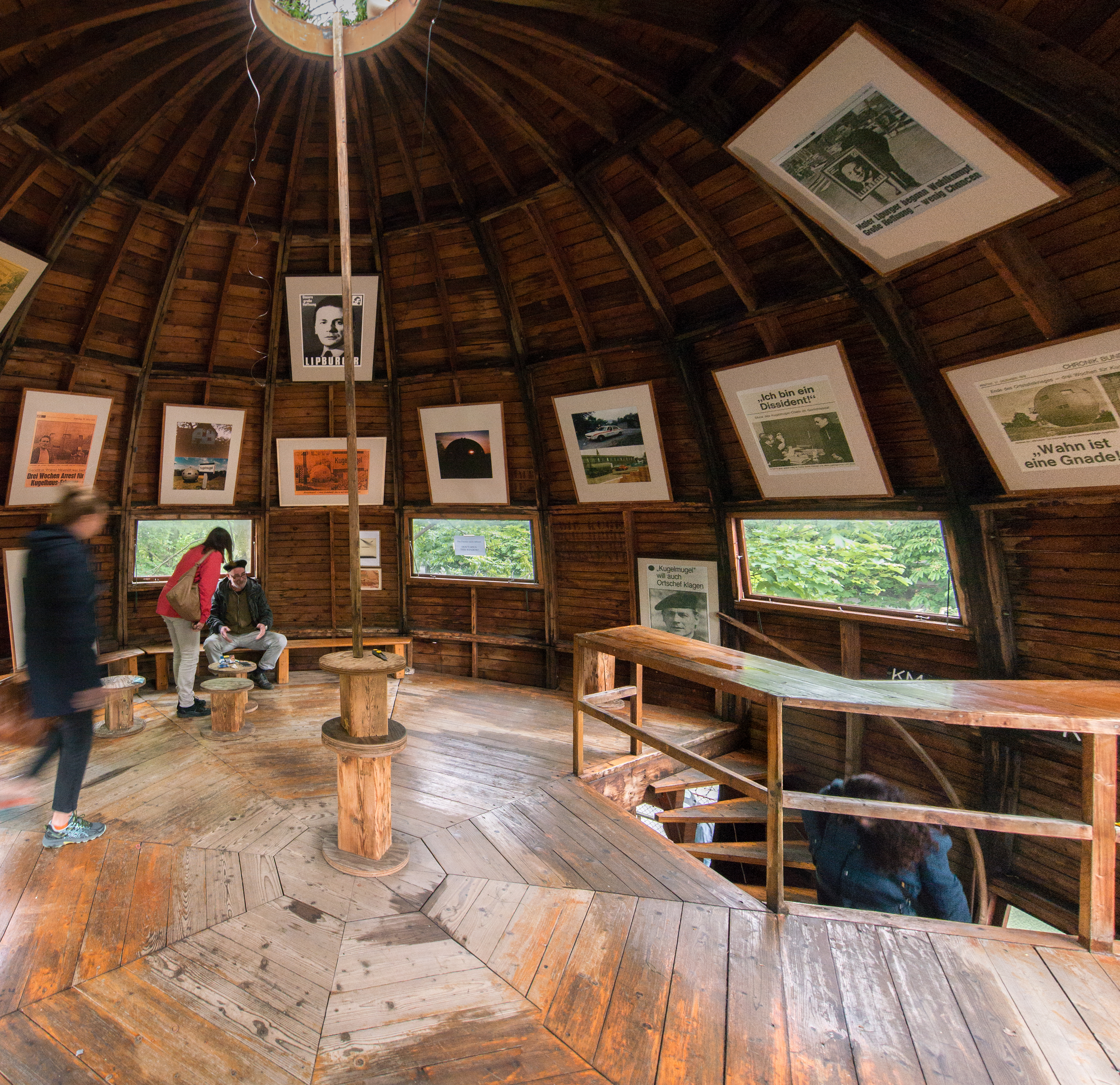
The interior of the spherical house

In 1971, the 8 meter in diameter building was constructed by Edwin Lipburger and his son Nikolaus in Katzelsdorf near Wiener Neustadt in Lower Austria. A prolonged dispute between the authorities and Lipburger ensued over the following years over the unpermitted construction. Lipburger declared Kugelmugel as its own micronation, even issuing passports. In August 1975, the township of Neudörfl offered to house the building and discussion of how to transport the building, potentially via helicopter were discussed, but ultimately did not pan out. In 1979, Lipburger was sentenced to prison for 10 weeks for "unlawful assumption of a public authority" (Amtsanmaßung).

In 1982 the building was taken apart and transported to Vienna in the Prater park, near the Hauptallee, and surrounded by eight-foot-tall barbed-wire fences. The house occupies the only address within the proclaimed Republic: "2., Antifaschismusplatz" ("2nd district of Vienna; Anti-Fascism Square"). In 1982 the building was officially adopted by the city of Vienna by then-mayor Helmut Zilk who granted the object "asylum". However it was then assumed by the city that the artistic object would only be temporary, so the legal dispute continued on with the city of Vienna after power and water was cut to Kugelmugel. Various lawsuits have been filed subsequently and eventually rose all the way to the Supreme Administrative Court of Austria in 2007. However all lawsuits failed with no formal agreement ever reached between Lipburger and the city. The city has stopped any attempts at reclaiming it and has accepted it as part of Vienna's culture and is allowing the building in its existence as a "building built without a permit" (Superädifikat).

Lipburger died in January 2015, but the Republic retains an official population of more than 650 non-resident citizens. Following Lipburger's passing, his son Nikolaus Lipburger took over the management of the nation. Subsequently in 2022, Nikolaus Lipburger hired Linda Treiber as new president of the nation to manage Kugelmugel.

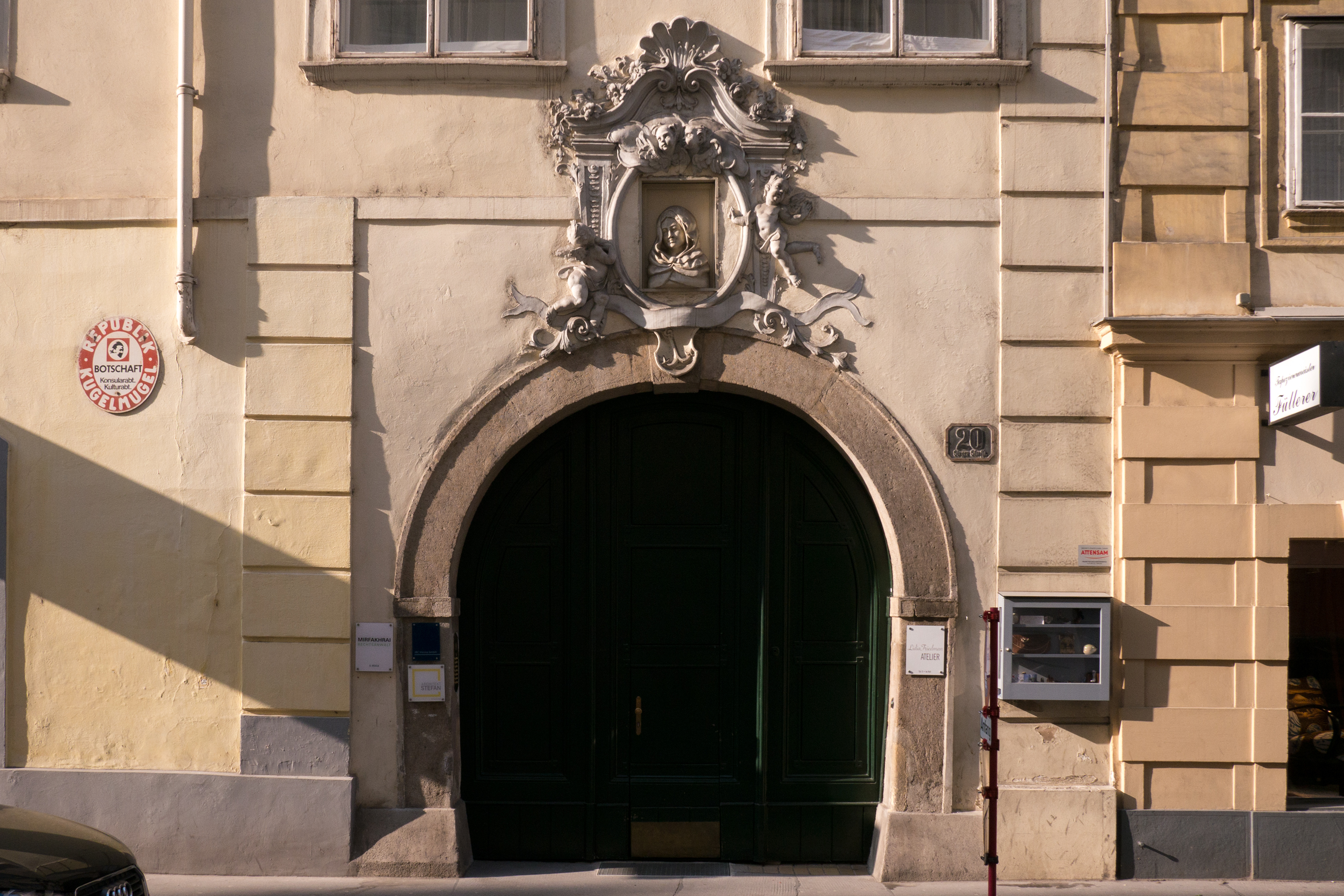
Embassy of the Republic of Kugelmugel at Singerstraße 20, Innere Stadt

Closed for some time during the COVID-19 pandemic, the "republic" reopened its borders to visitors on the 1st of June 2024. Visitors get issued a "visa permit" with stamp and signature for a fee to visit the art nation.

In German, the word "Kugel" means "ball" or "sphere"; "Mugel" is an Austrian German expression for a bump or a hill on a field, from which mogul skiing is also derived.
