= Guillaume Daniel Delprat =

Dutch-Australian metallurgist, mining engineer and businessman (1856-1937)

- Born: 1 September 1856; Delft, Netherlands
- Died: 15 March 1937 (aged 80)
- Education: apprentice engineer
- Occupations: metallurgist, mining engineer, and businessman

Guillaume Daniel Delprat CBE (1 September 1856 – 15 March 1937) was a Dutch-Australian metallurgist, mining engineer, and businessman. He is known for developing the froth flotation process for separating minerals.

== Early life and education ==
Guillaume Daniel Delprat was born on 1 September 1856 in Delft, Netherlands, the son of Major General Félix Albert Théodore Delprat (1812–1888), later minister of war, and his wife Elisabeth Francina, née van Santen Kolff.

Delprat attended a high school in Amsterdam and later became an apprentice engineer on the Tay Bridge in Scotland. He attended science classes in Newport-on-Tay and learned calculus from his father by post.

== Career ==
On returning to the Netherlands, he is said to have acted as assistant to Johannes Diderik van der Waals, physics professor at the University of Amsterdam. From 1879 to 1882, Delprat worked in Spain at the Tharsis Sulphur and Copper Mines.

In 1898, chairman Edward Wigg of BHP invited Delprat to Australia to become assistant general manager of BHP. He moved there with his wife and children. On 1 April 1899, he was promoted to general manager, a position he held until 1921. At BHP, he pioneered the froth flotation process for refining sulphide ore. Delprat foresaw the exhaustion of BHP's mine at Broken Hill, and pushed for moving the company's smelters to Port Pirie; also construction of the BHP Whyalla Tramway. He shifted BHP from silver and lead mining to zinc and sulphur production. These moves were the basis of BHP's later success.

Delprat also pushed construction of the BHP Newcastle Steelworks. The contract was signed on 24 September 1912 and the steelworks were opened by Governor-General Novar on 2 June 1915.

== Other activities ==
Delprat was also a sculptor, winning a silver medal in Paris for his bust of Louis Braille which is now held in the collections of Vision Australia, having been gifted to the Victorian Association of Braille Writers in 1929. A medallion set into the plinth is inscribed: "Offert par le Ministère des Affaires Étrangères; Louis Braille Centenary, Presented by French Government to The Victorian Association of Braille Writers, Melbourne 1929" and on the reverse side: "République Française".

== Recognition and honours ==
For Delprat's visionary judgement in the Newcastle Steelworks project, he was made a CBE.

In 1935 he was the first recipient of the medal of the Australasian Institute of Mining & Metallurgy.

== Personal life and death ==
G. D. Delprat married Henrietta Maria Wilhelmina Sophia Jas (died 5 December 1937) in Holland on 4 September 1879. They had two sons and five daughters.

Francisca Adriana "Paquita" Delprat (1891–1974; later Lady Francisca Adriana (Paquita) Mawson OBE), married geologist and explorer Douglas Mawson on 31 March 1914.

Another daughter, Carmen Paquita Delprat, was a noted violinist, who studied under Hermann Heinicke, Siegfried Eberhardt, and Alexander Petschnikoff.

Guillaume and Henrietta Delprat lived in the Adelaide suburb of Brighton for some time. They provided the land for their daughter Paquita and her husband Douglas Mawson to purchase land at 44 King Street to build their family home in 1919.

Delprat died in Melbourne after a short illness on 15 March 1937. He left an estate valued for probate in Victoria at £53,005; at £5687 in New South Wales; and at £900 in South Australia.
