= Patricia M. Mawson =

Australian Zoologist

Patricia Marietje Mawson AO (13 April 1915 – 16 December 1999) was an Australian zoologist and parasitologist. Also known as Pat Thomas after marriage, Mawson published more than 100 scientific articles on parasitic nematodes under her maiden name.

== Early life and education ==
Patricia Marietje Mawson was born on 13 April 1915 in Windsor, Victoria, the daughter of charity worker and biographer Francisca Adriana "Paquita" (née Deplrat) and geologist and Antarctic explorer Sir Douglas Mawson.

She began her education at Hopetoun School in the Adelaide beachside suburb of Brighton. Her mother was instrumental in establishing the small independent school, which was opened in 1922 by the Misses Fleming and operated out of the parish hall at St Jude's Anglican Church. Patricia completed her education at Woodlands Church of England Girls' Grammar School, earning the leaving certificate in 1932.

She graduated from the University of Adelaide in 1936 with a BSc and in 1938 MSc. Her masters thesis was titled "Some studies in Australian nematoda", with Thomas Harvey Johnson as her supervisor.

== Career ==
Mawson devoted her career to researching parasitic nematodes, publishing more than 100 articles under her unmarried name.

== Awards and recognition ==
In 1974 Mawson was awarded the Verco Medal by the Royal Society of South Australia.

In 1976 she was elected a Fellow of the Australian Society for Parasitology.

Mawson was appointed an Officer of the Order of Australia in the 1994 Queen's Birthday Honours in recognition of her "service to the science of zoology in both research and teaching and to the development of the Australian Helminthological Collection".

In 2024, she was inducted into the SA Environment Hall of Fame.

== Personal life ==
Mawson had a younger sister, Jessica, who became a bacteriologist.

Mawson married Welshman Ifor Morris Thomas, a zoology lecturer at the University of Sydney, on 14 January 1947 at the Mawsons' parish church, St Jude's Church, Brighton. They had three sons.

== Death and legacy ==
Her husband predeceased her in 1985. Mawson died on 16 December 1999.
