= Andrew Mawson =

Andrew Mawson may refer to:

- Andrew Mawson, Baron Mawson (born 1954), English social entrepreneur
- Andrew Mawson (cricketer) (born 1974), English cricketer
