= Paquita Mawson =

Australian community worker and writer

Francisca Adriana Mawson OBE
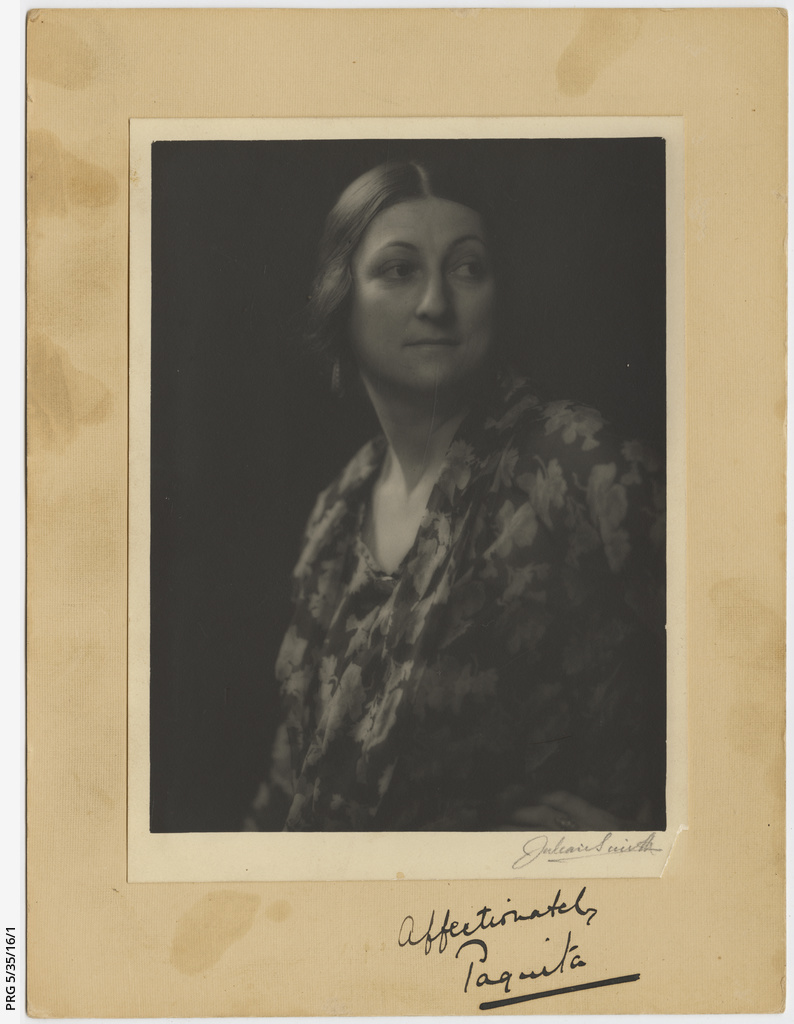
- Paquita Mawson, c.1935
- Born: Francisca Adriana Delprat; 19 August 1891; Acton, London, United Kingdom
- Died: 26 May 1974 (aged 82)
- Resting place: Brighton, South Australia
- Other names: Paquita Delprat; Paquita Mawson; Lady Mawson
- Occupations: Charity worker, biographer
- Spouse: Douglas Mawson (m. 1914)
- Children: Patricia M. Mawson; Jessica Mawson
- Father: Guillaume Daniel Delprat

Francisca Adriana "Paquita" Mawson OBE (née Delprat; 19 August 1891 – 26 May 1974) was an Australian charity worker and biographer. Having married geologist and Antarctic explorer Sir Douglas Mawson in 1914, she was also known as Lady Mawson.

== Early life and education ==
Francisca Adriana Delprat, known as "Paquita" (a diminutive of Francisca) from a young age, was born in Acton, London, on 19 August 1891 of Dutch parents. She was daughter of Henrietta Marie Wilhelmine Sophia (née Jas) and engineer Guillaume Daniel Delprat, who had five daughters and two sons. Guillaume Delprat later became general manager of BHP and established its reputation as the leading steelmaker in Australia. The family soon moved to Andalusia in Spain, where Delprat worked until accepting a job with BHP and migrating to Australia in 1898.

Mawson was educated at a convent school in Broken Hill, but the family moved to Adelaide in 1902, where she attended Tormore House School. Leaving school in 1908, she attended the Elder Conservatorium of Music, learning piano and singing.

== Life and work ==
Mawson met her future husband, geologist and Antarctic explorer Sir Douglas Mawson, at Broken Hill in late 1910 when he was undertaking geological expeditions there, and their courtship continued in her other family home in Tynte Street, North Adelaide, where her mother stayed while the children studied at school and university. They became engaged in 1911 and then endured a long separation while he was away in the Antarctic on the Australasian Antarctic Expedition (AAE) from mid-1911 until December 1913, during which time they wrote letters to each other, many of which were not received until his return. They married on 31 March 1914 at Holy Trinity Church of England, Balaclava, Melbourne, Captain John King Davis, who had captained SY Aurora and served as second-in-charge to Mawson of the AAE, served as best man. After Douglas was knighted in 1914, Paquita became Lady Mawson.

Leaving their first daughter Patricia (1915–1999; later a leading zoologist and parasitologist) with her mother in Melbourne, she sailed to England, where Douglas was working for the Ministry of Munitions. She supported him with secretarial work and also prepared hospital dressings. Their second child, Jessica Paquita "Quita" Mawson (1917–2004; married name McEwin), who became a bacteriologist, was born in London.

After WWI ended, they came back to Australia and settled in Adelaide. After renting a home in Brighton while getting their home built on a plot of land owned by her father, the family moved into their new home, "Jerbii" in King Street, Brighton, in 1920. The Mawsons lived in Brighton until at least 1958, when Douglas died. Paquita Mawson, among her many other activities, was instrumental in establishing Hopetoun School, which operated out of the parish hall at St Jude's Anglican Church.

She also joined and participated in the University Wives' Club, the Lyceum Club and the Queen Adelaide Club. She served as president of the Mothers' and Babies' Health Association and actively promoted baby care across the state. She also raised funds for a various causes, sometimes by using her organising skills to arrange concerts.

As a member of the Australian Red Cross Society during WWII, Mawson ran extensive appeals for clothing donations. The branch was responsible for sending over 3,000 cases of clothing to the UK. Her welfare work included assisting women and children who were brought to Australia as refugees. She established a club for refugees from the Dutch East Indies (now Indonesia).

She wrote a biography of her father titled A Vision of Steel: The Life of G. D. Delprat. It was published by Cheshire in 1958 and reviewed on the "Red Page" The Bulletin and elsewhere. Following her husband's death, she wrote about him in Mawson of the Antarctic, published in 1964 by Longman in London.

== Recognition ==
In 1946 Mawson was appointed an Officer of the Order of Orange-Nassau in 1946 for her work with refugees from the Dutch East Indies.

In 1951 she was recognised for her social welfare work in the 1951 Birthday Honours, becoming an Officer of the Order of the British Empire.

== Death and legacy ==
Mawson died on 26 May 1974. She was buried alongside her husband at St Jude's Anglican Church, Brighton, South Australia.

A photograph of Mawson (see infobox above), taken around 1935 by photographer and surgeon Julian Smith is held by the State Library of South Australia. The photograph is signed by Smith, and its mount is signed "Affectionately, Paquita", but no further information about the photograph is recorded.

A portrait of Mawson, painted by Ingrid Erns in the late 1940s, is held in the National Portrait Gallery in Canberra. She was the subject of her great-nephew Paul Delprat's 1966 Archibald entry, Lady Paquita Mawson.

A typescript of A Vision of Steel, along with many personal letters pertaining to her family, are held by the National Library in Canberra.

== Other family ==
One of Paquita's sisters, Carmen Paquita Delprat, was a noted violinist, who studied under Hermann Heinicke, Siegfried Eberhardt, and Alexander Petschnikoff.

Sydney artist Paul Delprat is a great-nephew, the grandson of Paquita's elder brother, Theo.
