= Julian Ashton Art School (building) =

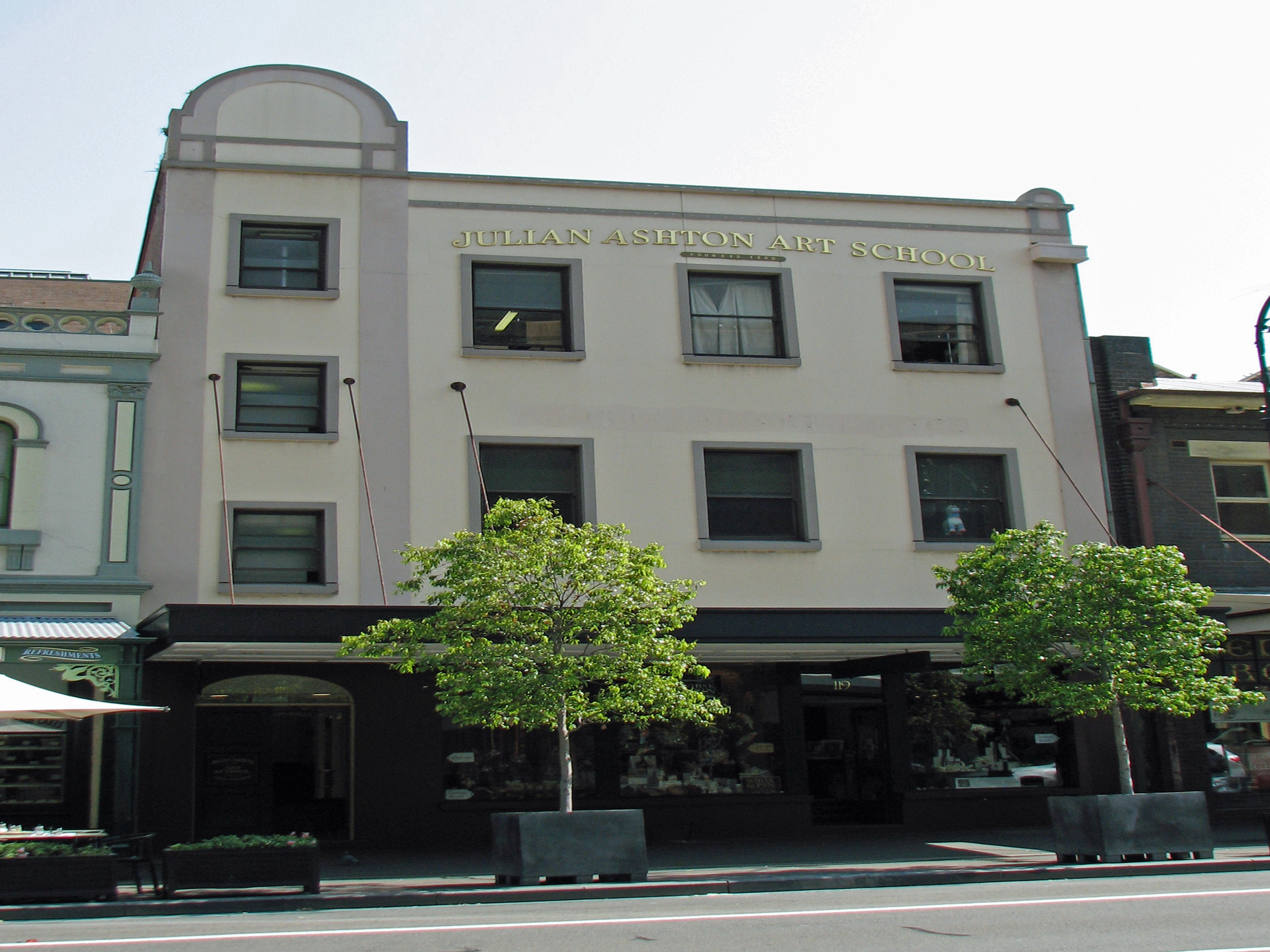
- Julian Ashton Art School, pictured in 2018

- Location within Sydney Location within Australia
- 33.8600°S 151.2084°E
- Location: 117-119 George Street, The Rocks, City of Sydney, New South Wales, Australia

History
- Built: 1890; 1956
- Built for: John Dalley (attrib. 1890); Women's League of Health (1956)

Site notes
- Architects: E. Lindsay Thompson; Spooner & Dixon
- Owner: Property NSW

New South Wales Heritage Register
- Official name: Julian Ashton Art School; Gallery and Shop
- Type: State heritage (built)
- Designated: 10 May 2002
- Reference no.: 1556
- Type: Other - Commercial
- Category: Commercial

The Julian Ashton Art School is a heritage-listed former offices and now art school and retail store at 117-119 George Street in the inner city Sydney suburb of The Rocks, New South Wales, Australia. It was designed by E. Lindsay Thompson and Spooner & Dixon. It is also known as Gallery and Shop. The property is owned by Property NSW, an agency of the Government of New South Wales. It is currently tenanted by the Julian Ashton Art School. It was added to the New South Wales State Heritage Register on 10 May 2002.

== History ==
=== Early land grant ===
Prior to the subdivision of the site, today's 117-119 George Street was part of the hospital precinct. The three buildings forming the hospital followed the western side of George Street, along with Principal and Assistant Surgeons' quarters. These were set back from the street alignment with fenced kitchen gardens visible in illustrations.

Dalley was a convict who came to Australia in 1819 to serve a life sentence. Following the relocation of the Sydney Hospital from George Street he was granted a section of land. Within six years he had taken two adjoining parcels of land in The Rocks. The original allotment 9 of Section 84 of the Town of Sydney was granted to John Dalley on 20 August 1834. Part of Lot 10 which was to become 117-119 George Street, was granted but not registered in the General Register of Deeds on 20 May 1840. It was on Lot 10 that Dalley had built a five roomed house by c. 1832. The retrospective granting of title was part of a more general problem in The Rocks where there were competing claims to ownership. A plan drawn two years later by John Russell shows clearly the extent of Dalley's granted land, being the two granted allotments 9 and 10. Buildings are present on both blocks, but with irregular outlines. It is possible that the building on Allotment 10 is earlier and straddles the surveyed grant. An interesting feature is that the rear of Allotment 9 is slightly indented and this was done to accommodate two small bluffs or outcrops of sandstone marked on the plan. This is the only accurate indication of the natural environment on the site.

Dalley's career as a convict eventually turned landowner and businessman was a relatively common one in NSW. The only significant variation to it is that he was the father of William Bede Dalley, a very successful barrister who became one of the most prominent NSW parliamentarians in the 1870s and 1880s. Born in 1831, it is probable that the young Dalley grew up on the site.

Occupancy for the second half of the nineteenth century is established through the Sands Directories; however, some allowance has had to be made for renumbering of the street. Initially 117–119 were numbered 119–121 George, the changeover to the present numbers taking place in 1880–1881.

The 1865 Trigonometric Survey shows in simple outline two identical-sized buildings with the narrow alleyway leading to unevenly sized rear yards. Another large building fronts Nurses Walk. An annotated drawing on the same base map shows a sanitation line running down the alleyway from about the centre of No. 119 to join with a sewer line running southwards along George Street which discharges as the Queens Wharf Sewer. This sewer was present in 1857.

The Percy Dove Plan of Sydney in 1880 shows the No. 119 marked as being as occupied by the British Flag Hotel adjoining the alleyway, and in No. 117 is O'Neil Outfitters. Johnson is the hotel's licensee. The alleyway leads to a yard behind No. 119, and No. 117 also has a small yard, with a clearly demarcated outbuilding. A substantial two-storey store occupies the back of the lot. Some years later in 1895 another plan identifies both buildings as being the Queensland Hotel. The rear arrangement is slightly different, with the alleyway continuing southwards in a kink to go around a probable building. The proportions of the yards are the same but there is now a brick structure in a slightly different position.

In 1900 the land was resumed by the Minister for Public Works as part of the more general resumption of the Observatory Hill Lands. A map prepared for this legal process provides excellent detail of the lot. The outline of the lot appears to be based on existing surveys, but it clearly shows the rear of the lot as being part of a dedicated laneway, even though it appears to have been encroached upon. The right of way again deflects from the main lot boundaries and turns to the south at the blocked laneway. No further information is available on the nature of the building at the rear of No. 119. A photograph is believed to show a two-storey building at the rear of No. 117, with the small dunny on the ground floor being the rectangle visible in the 1900 plan, with a slightly angled fence attached to its corner. It is not even clear whether it is an entirely industrial structure.

=== Oil, coal, and grease supplier ===
John Fell & Co. was a Sydney supplier of oil, coal and grease for industrial purposes. They took over occupation of the site from 1902 based on Sands Directory information and appear to have occupied the entire site. The one reasonably clear image of the building during their occupation shows that the doorway entrances to both No. 117 and No. 119 are marked with the company name. The block occupied by John Fell & Co. was rectangular and measured 34'6 by 82'8 (about 10.5m by 25.2m). Given the signage and the elaborate door and window surrounds on the ground floor it is possible that John Fell and Co. undertook an upgrade or even reconstruction of the façade of the building to mark their occupation. This would be consistent with the decorative style of the building.

In 1905 John Fell and Co, oil merchant is listed at 119 George Street, and two John Fells are listed as living at Kendall Street (suburb not specified) and at North Botany. If Kendall Street is an error for Kendall Lane it places one of the Fells living about 100 metres (330 ft) from the office.

The 1910 Sydney Trades Directory lists Fell under oil merchants. It also lists another 24 oil merchants. They were widely scattered but others had offices in Harrington Street, George Street North and Kent Street, suggesting that the Dawes Point peninsula was a sound commercial location to operate from, as it serviced a substantial maritime and industrial area. 117-119 George Street at this time comprised two separate styled façades incorporated into the same building. No. 117 is a plain façade with a single large door, by comparison No. 119 is very elaborate. Based on the building characteristics Fell and Co. appear to have renovated the building and its façade, but it is possible that the street-front buildings, or at least the main section, are a new construction.

A survey of 1923 shows the property as consisting of a single building with the side blind alley. The rear of the lot and a laneway are marked as being completely covered by structures. From the survey it is clear that there is a minor encroachment beyond the front building line and that the northern side of the adjoining No. 121 is set back slightly from the allotment boundary. John Wilson Fell, listed as a "Gentleman" purchased the property from the Crown on 4 June 1931. This was unusual in this block of George Street, as most properties remained in the ownership of the Government and would continue to do so to the present. Based on evidence from the subsequent site development application they ceased trading at that address by 1948.

=== Women's League of Health ===
The present building on the site was constructed in 1956. The main occupant of No. 117–119 in its later years was the Women's League of Health, later more simply the League of Health. The property was bought by Dorothea (Thea) Margaret Hughes on 10 December 1954. By the end of their occupation in 1973 the building was commonly known as the League of Health Building.

It is not clear whether Hughes bought it with her own capital or on behalf of the League of Health. The building that was constructed was a modern style dark red brick building with dark panels, probably stained timber. The development application papers lodged with Sydney City Council reveal that the development was not straightforward at all. Although the plans do not appear to have been retained, the development sequence is preserved in other council documents.

D. M. Hughes lodged a development application with Sydney City Council on 1 July 1955, registered as DA 434/55. Her address was listed as c/- The Women's League of Health, 308 George Street, Sydney. The application described the current offices, recently vacated by John Fell and Co. The application sought to extend the building to the rear, and to alter the existing building. The extensions would be about 22'6 by 30'6 (approx. 6.8m by 9.3m) on each of two floors, presumably in addition to the ground floor. The cost of the work was estimated at £9,000. In support of the application Hughes said "We hold classes in a special kind of physical training for women and for children and many of the classes are concerned with prenatal work to alleviate and decrease maternal mortality and morbidity". An inspection report by Council staff noted that about half of the ground floor was occupied by Howard Research, with the remainder of the ground floor and the upper floor unused.

No objection arising, the development application was approved on 8 August 1955. Shortly after the approval of the development application, a second DA was submitted by Hughes in February 1956. This proposed "(t)o demolish front portion of building and rebuild a three storey addition for use as an extension to the approved use of rear portion for health exercises". The cost was to be about £10,000. The architects were E. Lindsay Thompson, Spooner and Dixon, of 56 Hunter Street. There were no objections to the application and it was approved on 19 March 1956. The effect of the two applications was to demolish the existing two storey building from Fell's occupation and replace it with a completely new three-storey building. Footings from the Fell building, and possibly the earlier Dalley building survive as an informal basement level and have been incorporated into the construction, but everything above ground dates from 1956. The façade as built was entirely modern in form. Large metalframed windows provided light for each floor, separated by a possibly metal infill strip. The walls were constructed in mid-dark red brickwork. The stairwell and amenities on the southern side are highlighted with a strong vertical surround and smaller panel infill. In 1960 an application was made to the City Council on behalf of the League of Health to add external shades to the upper windows. The building initially had no awning but in 1973 Flame Opals applied for firstly a temporary awning and then a permanent metal awning.

The Australian branch of the Women's League of Health was established by Thea Stanley Hughes, who had been a student of Bagot Smith's, Hughes was born in Britain in 1935 but came to Australia at the age of four. She returned to Britain and enrolled in one of Bagot Smith's classes where she was an "outstanding" student. Hughes's philosophical background was influenced by the idea of reincarnation, and possibly by exposure to anthroposophy. As a result, her objectives were focussed more on developing women's character through self-development rather than on exercise. She purposefully dropped "and Beauty" from the League's Australian title. The League proved to be popular in Australia with more than 250 classes given weekly. Hughes wound the League up abruptly without it having another president or leader in 1974, coinciding closely with the League's departure from 117 to 119 George Street.

Bagot Smith's and Hughes' work and objectives with the League are characterised as "first wave feminism", being concerned with basic structural gender inequality. In both Britain and Australia the League sought to develop a role for women independent of their social place. Freedom of movement suggested freedom of action, and the development of clubs and classes provided alternative avenues for women to associate. Although not figuring prominently in Australia in comparison to, for example, the fight for equal pay and conditions, these social movements helped the process of providing alternatives to the existing structure of society, and introducing an agenda of social criticism that influenced later feminism.

=== Retail outlet for opals ===
117-119 George Street was acquired by the Sydney Cove Redevelopment Authority on 27 April 1971. Flame Opals, a specialist retailer in opals, moved into 117-119 George Street in September 1973. Operated by Mr William (Bill) Cudlipp it was one of the first tourist oriented businesses in The Rocks and, according to Colonel Owen Magee (the Sydney Cove Redevelopment Authority's Executive Director of the time): "his business acumen allowing him to see the opportunities in what was then a grubby area, his near neighbours at that time being a row of derelict shops left that way by the BLF bans". Mr William Cudlipp remembers that when he moved in that there was a man making uniforms in the basement of the building. The only access to the basement was a trapdoor in the internal stair riser. Between 1973 and 1978 extensive ground floor renovations took place as part of the initial five-year lease to Flame Opals. The works proposed to be completed in 1978 were:

- Erect new wooden display units;
- Redesign and reposition existing display units;
- Erect a new mezzanine area;
- Create a new secure selling area at the rear.

The mezzanine level raised the rear level of the ground floor by four steps. This had the incidental consequence of requiring the remnant walls of the basement to be raised by several courses of modern brick to support the floor.

=== Julian Ashton Art School tenancy ===
The Julian Ashton Art School is currently the long-term tenant of the top floor, but was formerly on both upper floors. It moved into its current location in 1977 from the former Geological and Mining Museum. It operates a large and smaller studio and an office and store room. The school's collection of works and plaster sculptures are housed in the building.

In c. 1985 the thoroughly modern red brick façade of the building was altered to make it blend in better with its neighbours and the prevailing historical motif of The Rocks. This required the partial bricking-up of the front windows on the upper floors, leaving three symmetrically placed windows in each floor. The windows in the toilets backing from the stairwell remained. The front façade was rendered, with simple horizontal string courses providing a mock "between the wars" styling. A semi-circular pediment was raised above the southern end of the façade. The result is reasonably effective, as the expectation from a casual glance is that it is an older building with a make-over, rather than a modern one artificially aged.

In 1987 a major refit was undertaken to the lower floor of 117-119 George Street. The work included:

- Installing a new street awning to the frontage of the building;
- Erecting a signboard;
- Putting in door and window hardware.

Additional works required included the installation of a new steel beam on the first floor. The Hogarth Gallery, which specialised in the sale and promotion of Aboriginal art was the last tenant of the central floor.

== Description ==
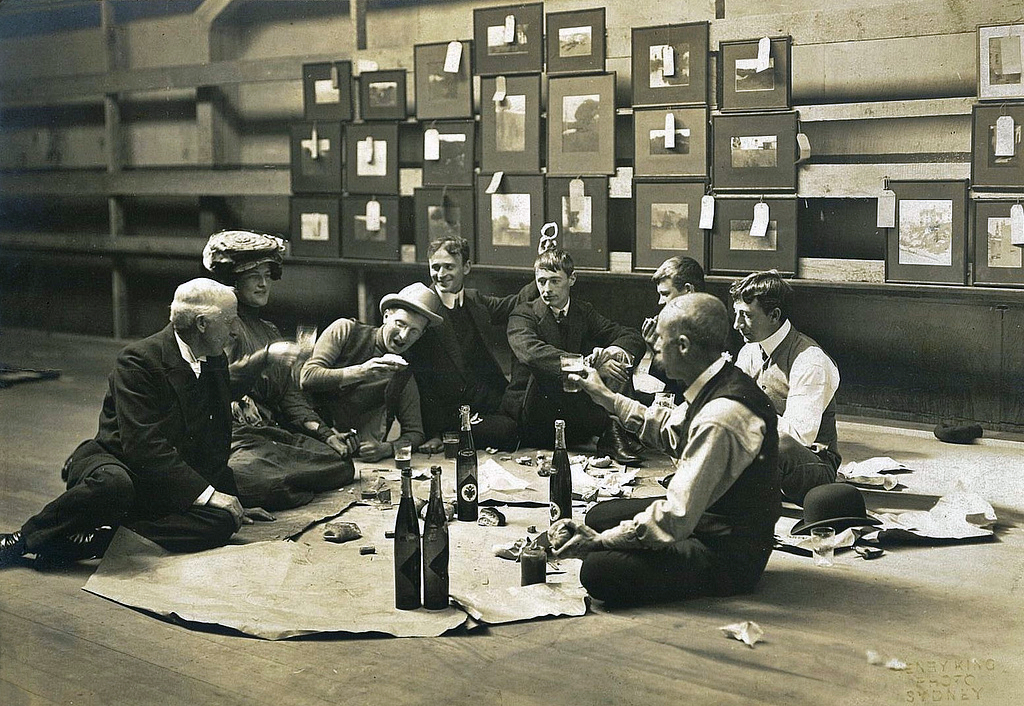
Photograph by Henry King showing members of the Society of Artists' 1907 Selection Committee, including Julian Ashton (far left) and Norman Lindsay (fifth from left)

The Sydney Art School (also known as the Julian Ashton Art School), which Ashton established in 1890 as the "Academy Julian", has been an influential art school in Australia.

Julian Ashton students have included William Dobell, John Olsen, Brett Whiteley and Nora Heysen.

Howard Ashton's son, J. Richard Ashton, and his wife Wenda ran the School from 1960, when, among many gifted artists, Ian Chapman and Archibald Prize winner Francis Giacco attended, until 1977 when Phillip Ashton (Richard's son) became Principal, this being the time of Haydn Wilson, political cartoonist Bill Leak and artist Paul Newton.

In 1988 the school was incorporated and Paul Delprat, Julian Ashton's great-grandson, himself an ex-student took over the running of the school, becoming the current principal. In 1989 the school's antique casts and easels, which date back to 1890, were classified by the National Trust. The school's main campus is in The Rocks, Sydney, located opposite the Museum of Contemporary Art Australia at 117-119 George Street, The Rocks. The building is listed on the New South Wales State Heritage Register.

c. 1955; Built By: 1800s. As at 17 May 2001, Archaeology Assessment Condition: Partly disturbed. Assessment Basis: 1830s building remnants. Archaeology Partly disturbed, although an archaeological resources may exist in basement.

== Heritage listing ==
As at 5 November 2008, the present Julian Ashton Art School located at 117-119 George Street is significant at a state level as the headquarters of the Women's League of Health, the Australian offshoot of a parent British health and fitness movement. The League represents a "first wave feminist" movement aimed at empowering women through physical fitness and education, and strongly reflects the philosophies of the League's founder and sole leader in Australia, Thea Stanley Hughes.

The built fabric has significance through its association with the League as its headquarters, and through its contribution to the streetscape. The large and well-lit spaces on the first and second floor were well-suited to holding classes of the League. The façade modified to blend-in with the historic surroundings represents one way of thinking of the professionals in heritage conservation of the 1980s, and provides evidence of an attempt of the authorities to act in line with this way of thinking.

The building's façade has been modified to make it blend in to the range of buildings present along that section of George Street. As a result, it contributes to the significance of The Rocks Conservation Area and the George Street streetscape. The early occupation of the building by Flame Opals is part of the early history of the Government ownership of the building through the Sydney Cove Redevelopment Authority, and the transformation of The Rocks into a retail tourism precinct. The association of the site with John Dalley is locally significant in the context of The Rocks, where he is representative of successful emancipist entrepreneurs. There is a potential strong or special association of the site with feminist history in NSW, as a result of its association with the Women's League of Health. There is potential archaeological and structural evidence of earlier buildings and occupation on the site preserved in or near the basement area. The use of the building by the Women's League of Health is an unusual instance of a health or fitness group being directly associated with a single building.

Julian Ashton Art School was listed on the New South Wales State Heritage Register on 10 May 2002 having satisfied the following criteria.

The place is important in demonstrating the course, or pattern, of cultural or natural history in New South Wales.

The building was important in the history of the Women's League of Health, an Australian variation of an extremely popular British physical health movement. The strength of the movement indicates that it met a particular need for both social activity and exercise, combined with health and pregnancy information. The League itself is a good example of "first wave feminism" within the Australian community. The exercise regimes are representative of a number of physical activity focussed formal groups and movements that developed in Australia during the Inter-war period and following WWII. The early occupation of the building by Flame Opals is part of the early history of the Government ownership of the building through the Sydney Cove Redevelopment Authority, and the transformation of The Rocks into a retail tourism precinct. The site has an association with, successively, the Convict Hospital, Hotels and Boarding houses and small scale businesses. These are representative of the pattern of occupation and development of The Rocks through the nineteenth and early 20th centuries.

The place has a strong or special association with a person, or group of persons, of importance of cultural or natural history of New South Wales's history.

The building is associated with the Women's League of Health, which is synonymous with Dorothea (Thea) Stanley Hughes, who brought the movement to Australia, established it here and ran it until she wound it up. Hughes is important for her role in the development and operation of the League as an example of an early fitness and health movement. This association is significant on State level.

The association of the site with John Dalley is significant in the context of The Rocks, where he is representative of successful emancipist entrepreneurs. The site has an association with William Bede Dalley, as the place of his birth and childhood. While it is likely that his later life and personality were influenced by his childhood experiences in The Rocks, there is no specific significant connection with the legal and political work for which he is regarded.

The place is important in demonstrating aesthetic characteristics and/or a high degree of creative or technical achievement in New South Wales.

The building's façade to George Street is locally interesting as an attempt of the authorities to convert a modernist, 1950s building to make it blend in with the adjacent façades of the historic pre-modernist buildings. The building, with its current façade and scale, contributes to the appreciation of this section of the George Street streetscape as a mosaic of late 19th- and early 20th-century architecture.

The place has a strong or special association with a particular community or cultural group in New South Wales for social, cultural or spiritual reasons.

There is a potential strong or special association of the site with feminist history in NSW, as a result of its association with the Women's League of Health. The building may also be of importance to any other groups with special interest in the Women's League of Health and its contributions to the development of Women's rights in NSW and Australia.

The place has potential to yield information that will contribute to an understanding of the cultural or natural history of New South Wales.

The site has the potential to contain archaeological evidence of previous occupations as far back as c. 1832, when Dalley's building was constructed, through later 19th-century occupation of the site, and evidence of the foundations of the c. 1900 John Fell and Co. building.

The site is unlikely to contain significant or substantial evidence of either indigenous (pre or post-1788) deposits or evidence relating to the Hospital precinct. The known and potential archaeological resource has the ability to clarify the history of the site's building construction sequence and to contribute to the documentation of patterns of life in The Rocks, and more generally in Sydney.

The place possesses uncommon, rare or endangered aspects of the cultural or natural history of New South Wales.

The original building was of a common form, represented by many examples throughout Sydney in commercial and industrial areas. Many of these retain greater integrity than this example. The modified façade however is interesting in the history of heritage conservation in The Rocks, as it presents relatively rare evidence of attempts to historicize modern buildings that are located in a sensitive historical environment. The use of the building by the Women's League of Health is an unusual instance of a health or fitness group being directly associated with a single building.

== See also ==
- Julian Ashton
