= John Passmore (artist) =

Australian artist

- Born: 4 February 1904; Redfern, New South Wales, Australia
- Died: 9 October 1984 (aged 80); Stanmore, New South Wales
- Education: Sydney Art School
- Known for: Painting

John Richard Passmore (4 February 1904 – 9 October 1984) was an abstract impressionist Australian artist. Passmore trained in Australia before spending many years in England. He returned to Australia, where he taught. When he died he left his money to his family but his paintings to an acquaintance.

== Life ==
Passmore was born on 4 February 1904 at Redfern, New South Wales. His parents were Elizabeth and John Passmore, who was a watchman. He was only thirteen when he left school and began working as a signwriter's assistant. Passmore studied at the Julian Ashton Art School, which is also known as the Sydney Art School. His fellow students included Jean Bellette and Paul Haefliger. He married Muriel Roscoe in 1925, and they had one son. However, in 1933 he left the relationship and, like Bellette and Haefliger, he travelled to England and studied at the Westminster School of Art, where he was taught by figurative painters Bernard Meninsky and Mark Gertler.

For many years, Passmore lived in England, working as a layout artist with Lintas both before and after World War II. For most of the war, he was a conscript in the Royal Air Force. During his time in England, he sometimes stayed in a cottage in Suffolk owned by his supervisor at Lintas. There he painted landscape compositions strongly influenced by Paul Cézanne.

Returning to Australia in 1951, Passmore taught art, first at his alma mater, Julian Ashton School. Passmore was the main teacher at this impressive private school as the previous lead teacher Henry Gibbons retired. One of his favourite students, Yvonne Audette, compared his return to the school as "like Moses". He taught the students to look at the subject of their paintings as not only a connection of rods, but also as a collection of facets and as a creation of basis mathematical shapes. The workaholic Passmore enthused about Cézanne and passed his, and Cézanne's, views on tone and structure onto his students. Passmore, however, was also a difficult person. He was barely making enough money to keep himself and he was bitter that he had to struggle. He worked hard on his own work, but it was kept in a separate room and his students were not allowed to see it.

Passmore then went on to teach at the Newcastle Technical College, and finally East Sydney Technical College. His students included John Olsen, Keith Looby and Colin Lanceley. his paintings from the period stood between expressionism and abstraction; the works are often compared to another artist of the period, Ian Fairweather.

Passmore had a heart attack in the early 1960s. Passmore lived the last decades of his life painting, as a recluse, and his final weeks were in a home for the destitute near his birthplace. Passmore died on 9 October 1984 in Sydney. In his will, he left 270 paintings to Elinor Wrobel, a stranger who befriended him at an art gallery. These included many created during that later period. Passmore's son was left £70,000 but he also contested the will. An out of court settlement was made and Wrobel retained control of the artist's estate of paintings, and she eventually closed the gallery owned by her and her husband and they opened a museum in which over forty of the paintings were displayed.

Passmore was cremated, and his ashes were placed in Wrobel's garden at his request. Works by Passmore are held by the National Gallery of Australia and most of the country's other major public collections. The Art Gallery of New South Wales holds many works by Passmore, including paintings and drawings. The Gallery organised a touring retrospective exhibition of his work in 1985; one of Passmore's paintings, Poppies, fruit and skull, was included in the Gallery's 2014 exhibition of Australian still lifes.
