= Elioth Gruner =

Australian artist

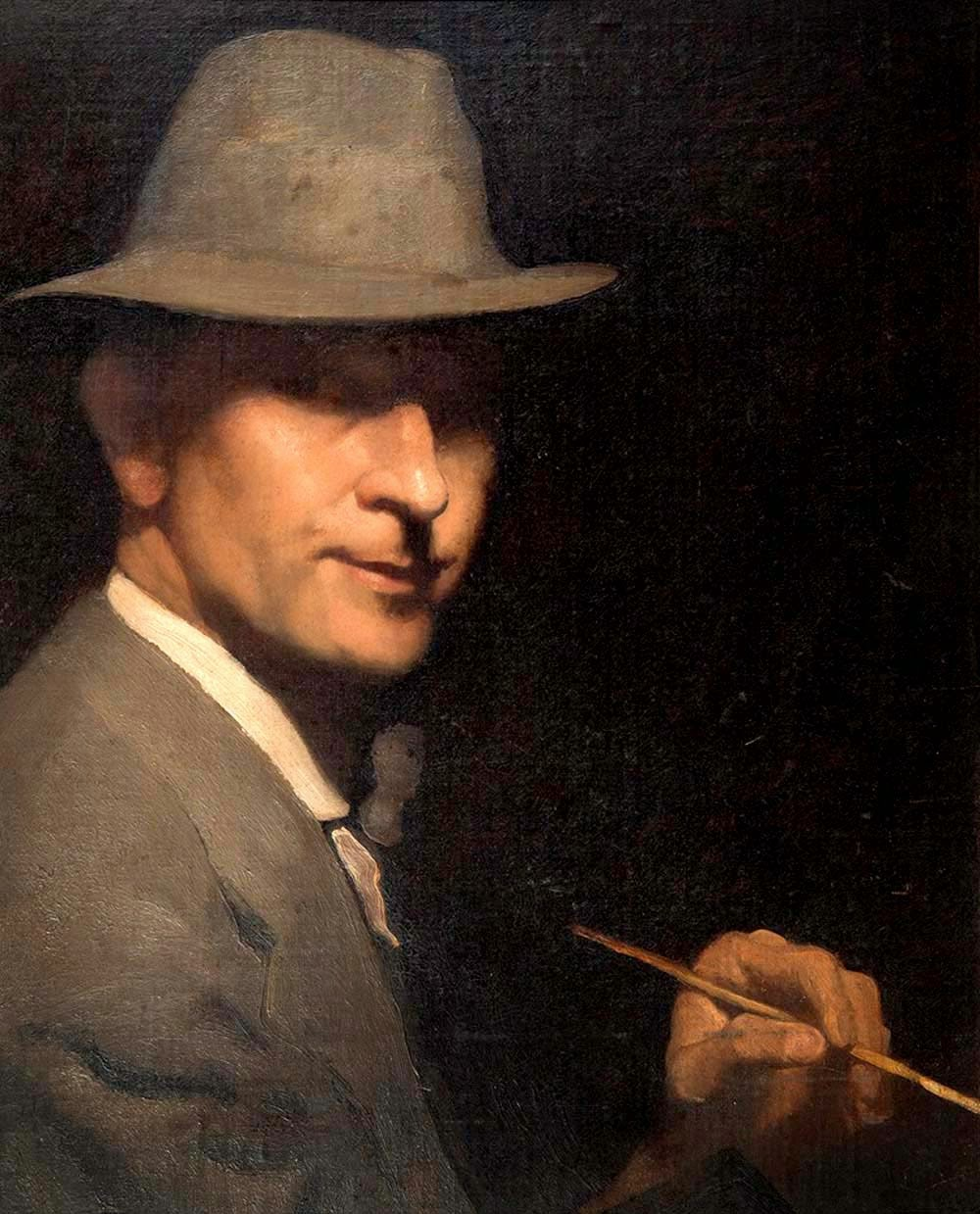
- Self-portrait
- Born: Elioth Lauritz Leganyer Gruner; 16 December 1882; Gisborne, Poverty Bay, New Zealand
- Died: 17 October 1939 (aged 56); Sydney, New South Wales, Australia
- Other name: Elliott Grüner
- Occupation: Painter
- Known for: Painting

Elioth Lauritz Leganyer Gruner (16 December 1882 – 17 October 1939) was an Australian artist. A successor of the plein air Heidelberg School tradition in Australian art, Gruner is known for his high-key impressionist landscapes and his ability to capture the ephemeral effects of light. According to Norman Lindsay, Gruner "painted the purest light that ever has been seen on a bit of canvas".

Gruner won the Wynne Prize for landscape painting seven times, the most of any Australian artist besides Hans Heysen. One of Gruner's winners of the prize, Spring Frost (1919), has since become his best known work, and is regarded as perhaps the most loved Australian landscape painting in the Art Gallery of New South Wales.

== Early life ==
Gruner was born in Gisborne, New Zealand, younger son of Elliott Grüner, a Norwegian-born bailiff, and his Irish wife Mary Ann, who died in 1922. Gruner was brought to Sydney before he was a year old and at an early age showed a desire to draw. When about 12 years old his mother took him to Julian Ashton, who gave him his first lessons in art. At 14 years of age he obtained a position in a shop where he worked from 7.40 a.m. to 9.30 p.m. to help to maintain the household after his father and older brother died.

== Artistic career ==
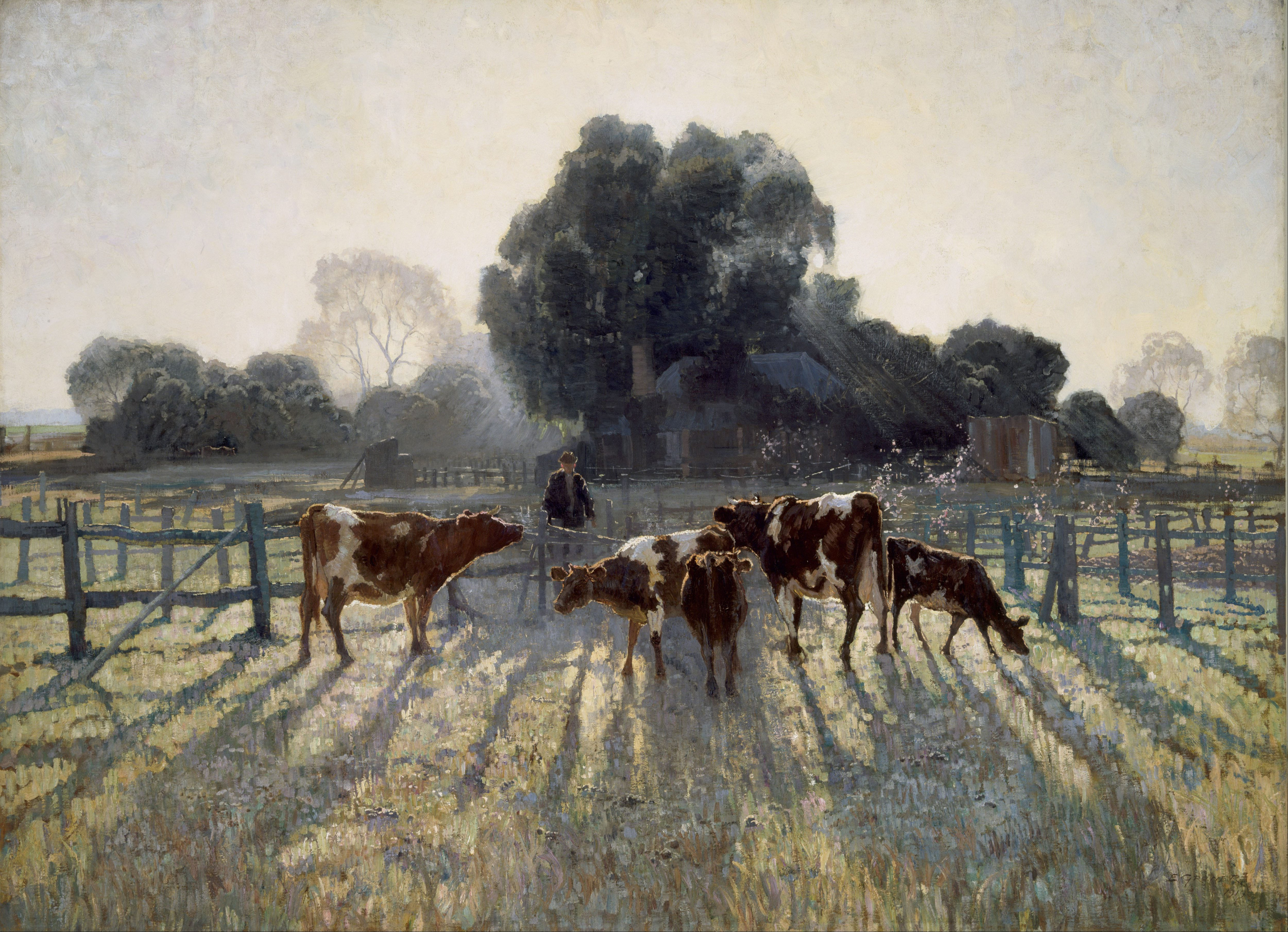
Spring Frost, 1919, Art Gallery of New South Wales

Gruner managed to do some painting on weekends, and in 1901 began to send work to the exhibitions of the Society of Artists, Sydney. From around 1907 his work began to attract serious attention: one admirer was Norman Lindsay. In 1911 a small shop was started in Bligh Street, Sydney, to sell works of art produced in Australia, and for a time Gruner took charge of it. He then became an assistant to Julian Ashton at the Sydney Art School, and during Ashton's illness took complete charge of classes at the school for about three months. In 1916 he was the winner of the Wynne Prize with a small landscape, Morning Light, a painting showing the farm of Jim Innes at Emu Plains. This painting was purchased by the Art Gallery of New South Wales (AGNSW). Gruner was again the winner of the Wynne Prize in 1919 with his painting Spring Frost depicting Jim Innes and his cattle and in the following year the AGNSW trustees commissioned him to paint a large picture for the gallery, "The Valley of the Tweed". Though this was awarded the Wynne Prize in 1921 and is a capable work, it scarcely ranks among his best efforts. He seldom afterwards took anything larger than a 24-inch canvas.

In 1923 Gruner visited Europe and was away from Australia for around two years. The effect of travel on his work was very noticeable: there was generally a good deal of simplification, more attention to pattern, and a freer and wider sweep of his brush. Sir William Orpen had provided constructive comments which altered Gruner's style. He became less interested in the problems of light and occasionally his work took on a slightly cold aspect. The changes were not always welcomed by his admirers, but Gruner was right not to allow himself to fall into a groove. He held a one-man show in 1927 and, not being a particularly productive artist, was in a position to sell almost everything he produced. Gruner spent much time in finding a suitable subject, and more still in carefully considering it before a brushstroke was made. Later, Gruner became interested in the study of light again, and some excellent works of his last period combined the qualities of his art and his passion. In 1938 he joined and exhibited with Robert Menzies' anti-modernist foundation, the Australian Academy of Art.

Gruner suffered from chronic nephritis and died at his home at Waverley on 17 October 1939. He was cremated with Anglican rites. He never married but he left descendants in Australia and New Zealand.

== Wynne Prize awards ==
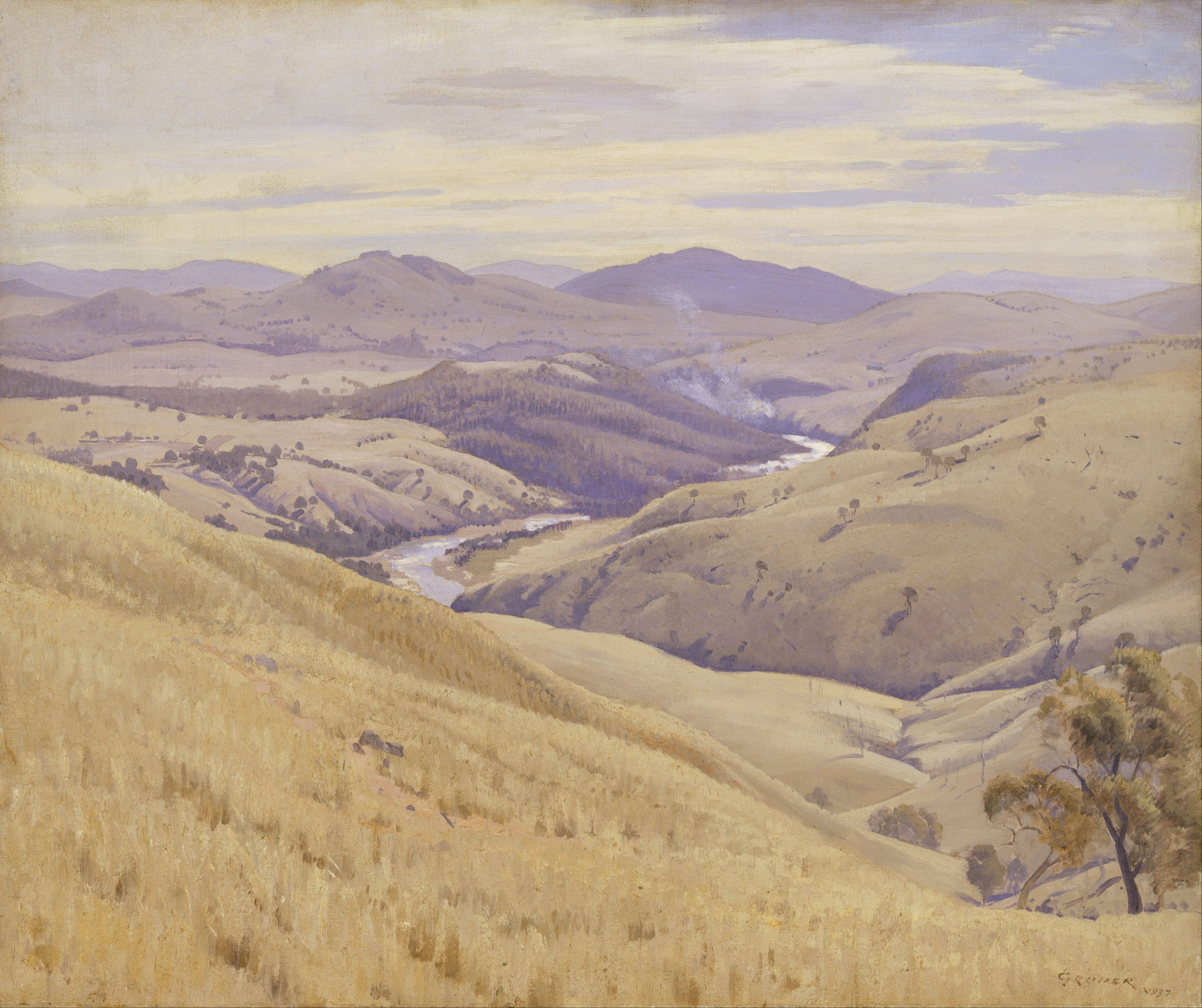
Weetangera, Canberra, 1937, Art Gallery of New South Wales

- 1916 – Morning Light
- 1919 – Spring Frost
- 1921 – Valley of the Tweed
- 1929 – On the Murrumbidgee
- 1934 – Murrumbidgee Ranges, Canberra
- 1936 – An Australian Landscape
- 1937 – Weetangera, Canberra

== Works on exhibition ==
In September 2014, the Gruner painting, untitled but known as The dry road, 1930, was acquired by the Canberra Museum and Gallery (CMAG), from a seller in Sydney. The foreground is dominated by a dusty road and fence behind, running from bottom-left to the middle-right of the picture, with a range of tree-covered mountains behind the mainly treeless valley. It is believed to show a stock route in the Naas Valley in Canberra's south. The main mountain is believed to be Mount Tennent (known to local Indigenous Australians as Tharwa).

== Selected paintings ==
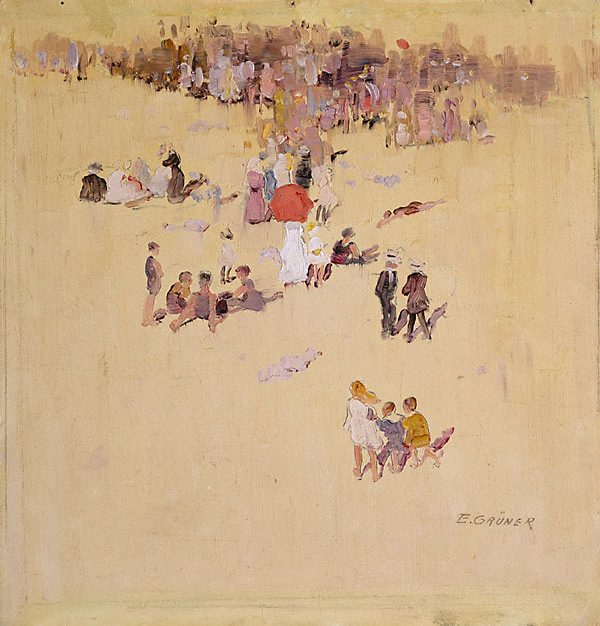
Bondi Beach, 1912, Art Gallery of New South Wales

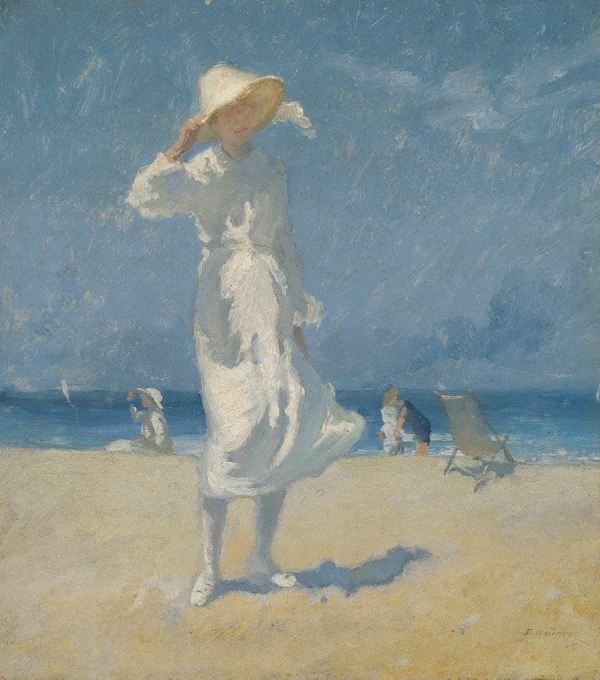
Afternoon, Bondi, 1915, Art Gallery of New South Wales

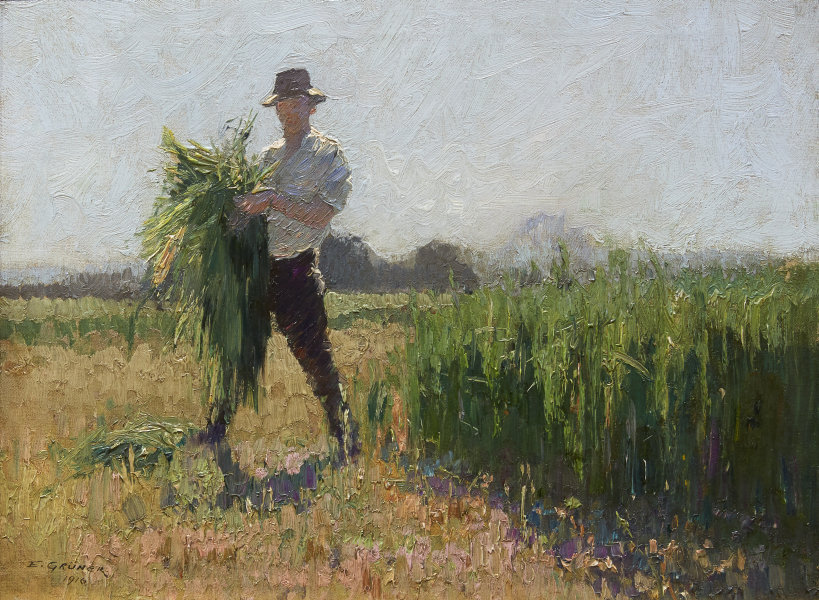
Summer Morning, 1916, Art Gallery of New South Wales

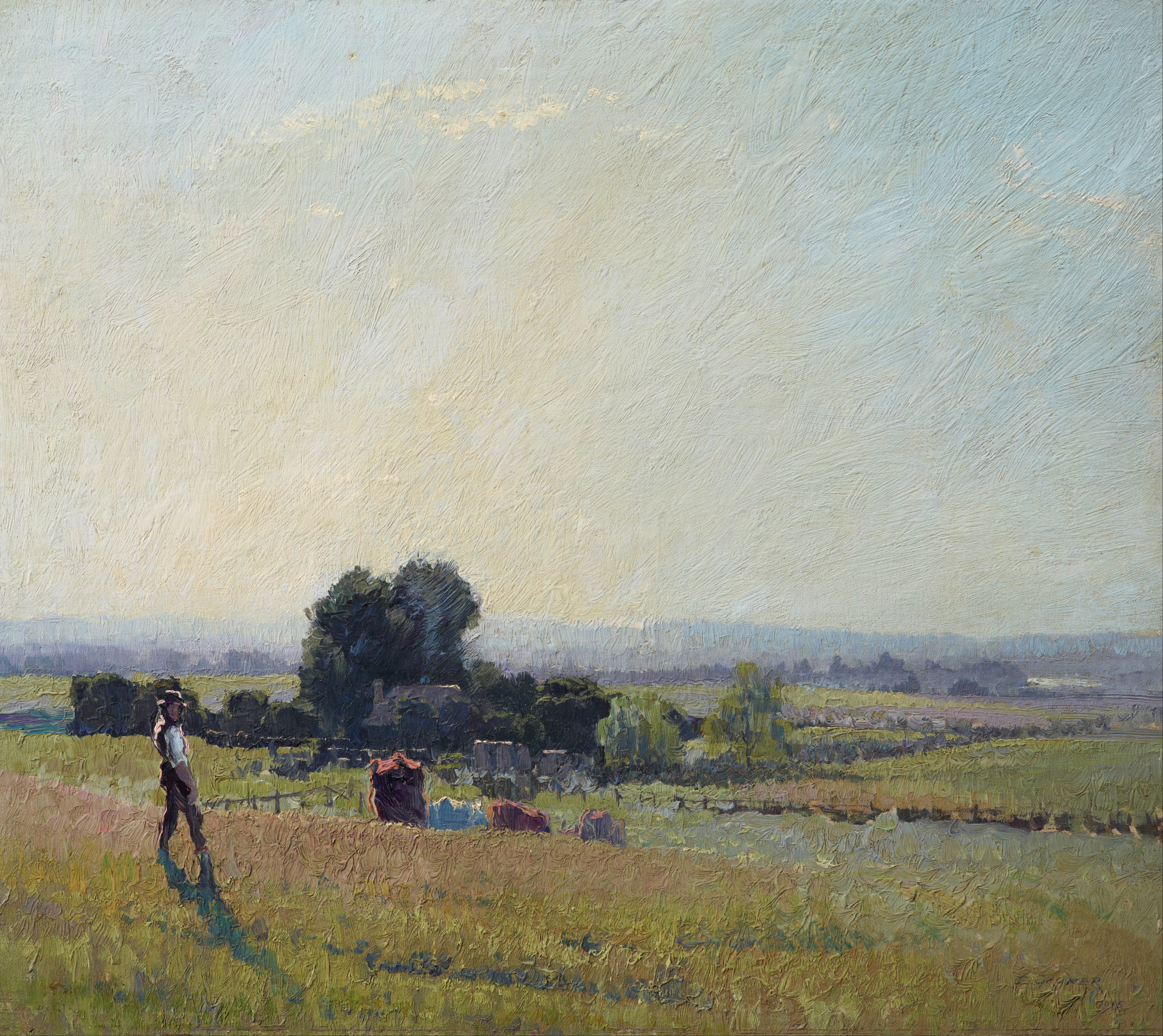
Morning Light, 1916, Art Gallery of New South Wales

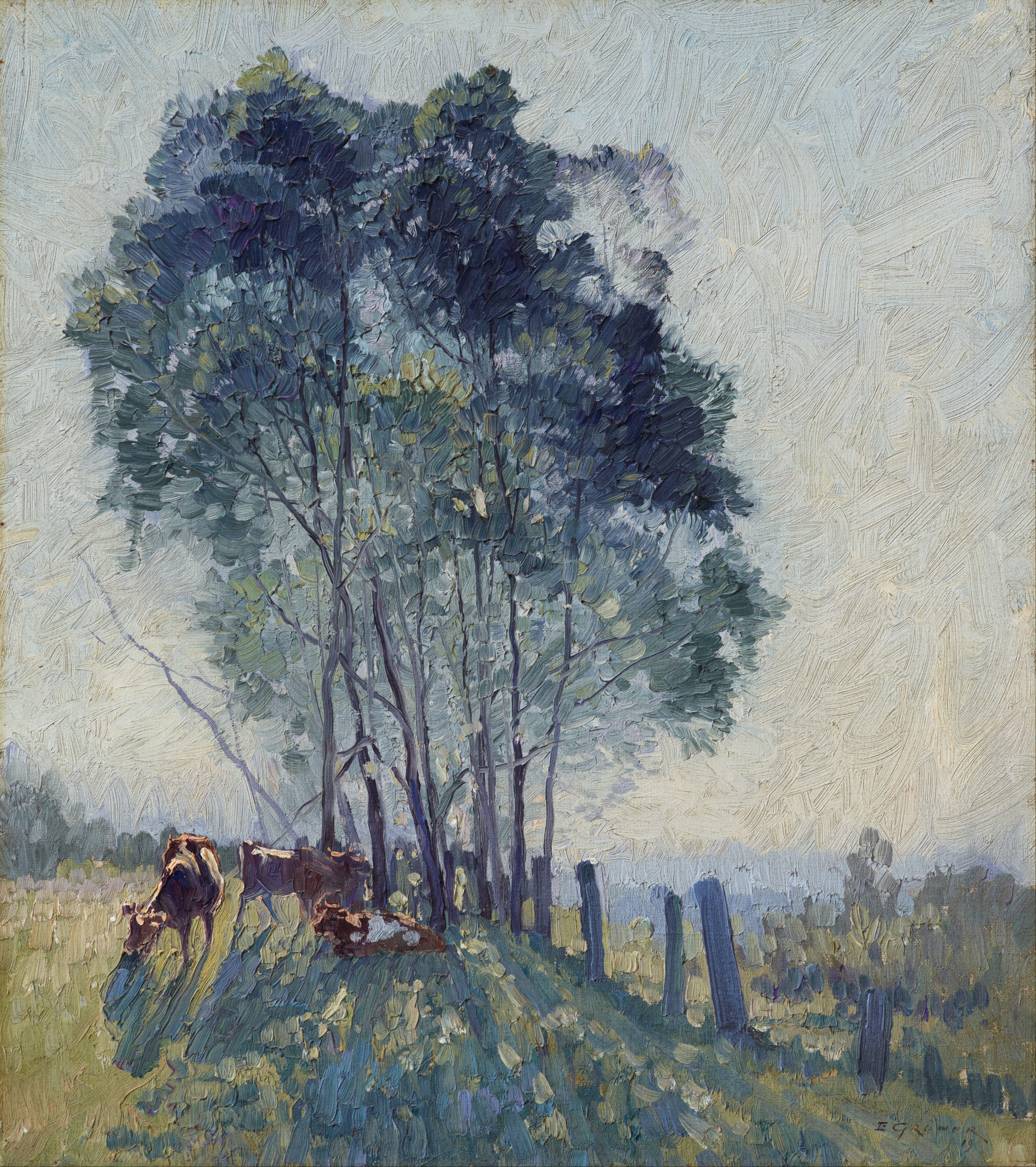
The Wattles, 1919, Art Gallery of New South Wales

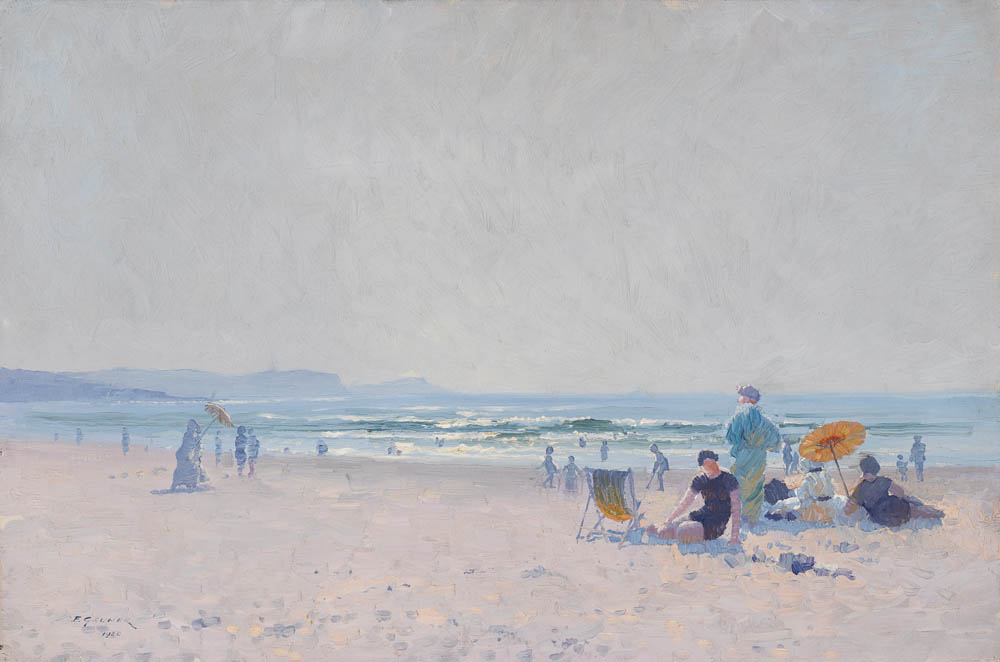
On the Sands, 1920, private collection
