= Florence Turner Blake =

Australian artist (1873–1959)

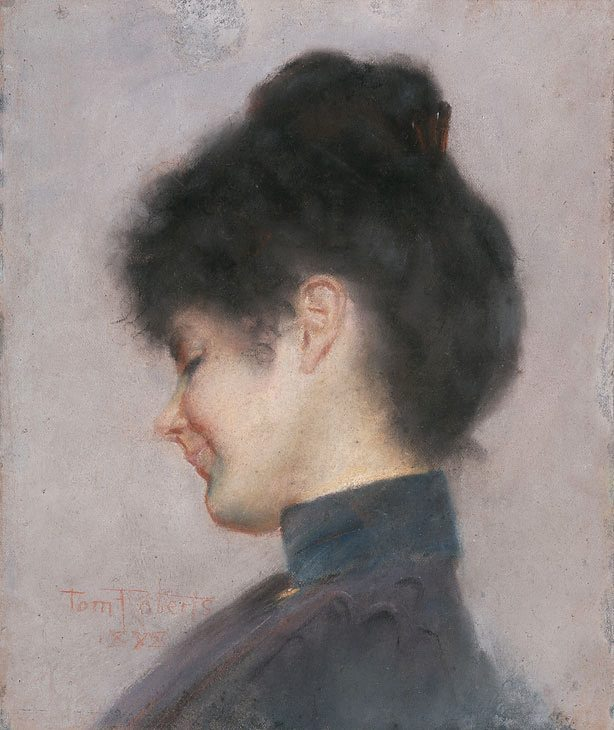
- Miss Florence Greaves painted by Tom Roberts, 1898
- Born: Florence Turner Blake Greaves; 26 October 1873; Armidale, New South Wales, Australia
- Died: 8 April 1959 (aged 85); Ryde, New South Wales, Australia
- Education: Sydney Art School
- Spouse: William Edward Kugelmann Mofflin (1902–1915)

Florence Turner Blake (1873–1959) was an Australian artist and benefactor. She was also known professionally as Florence Turner Mofflin, Florence Turner Greaves and Florence Mofflin.

== Early life ==
The youngest of six children she was born as Florence Turner Blake Greaves on 26 October 1873 at Armidale, New South Wales to parents William Albert Braylesford Greaves and Annie Greaves, née Mackenzie. When she was about seven the family moved to Braylesford, in Bondi Road, Bondi.

== Career ==
Florence Greaves was one of Julian Ashton's first students at his Sydney Art School It is likely that she met Tom Roberts through Ashton. There are two portraits of Florence by Tom Roberts, Portrait of Florence (circa 1898) and a pastel, Miss Florence Greaves, drawn in 1898.

In April 1902, Florence married William Edward Kugelmann Mofflin at St Luke's Anglican Church, Concord, Sydney. Although some of her works bear her married name, she divorced her husband in 1915.

Following her father's death in 1925 she traveled to London where she studied at the Slade School, London between 1925 and 1929 under Henry Tonks and became friendly with Lucien Pissarro, who gave her a painting.

In 1928 she dropped the name of her former husband by deed-poll and was known by the name Florence Turner Blake, in reference to her great-grandparents on her father's side, Thomas Turner and Barbara Blake.

She is best known for water-colour paintings on silk fans, especially Frivolers (1916) and Garden of Dreams (1920), in the collection of the National Art Gallery of New South Wales, and The Silver Moon, in the National Gallery of South Australia.

== Benefactor ==
Florence Blake died at Ryde, New South Wales on 8 April 1959 and was cremated. She left almost the whole of her estate, valued for probate at 54,214 pounds, to the Art Gallery of New South Wales, the largest bequest it had received up until that time.

Greaves Place in the Canberra suburb of Conder is named in her honour. Also, Mofflin Street, Chisholm in the Australian Capital Territory is named after her.
