= Morning Light (Gruner) =

1916 painting by Elioth Gruner

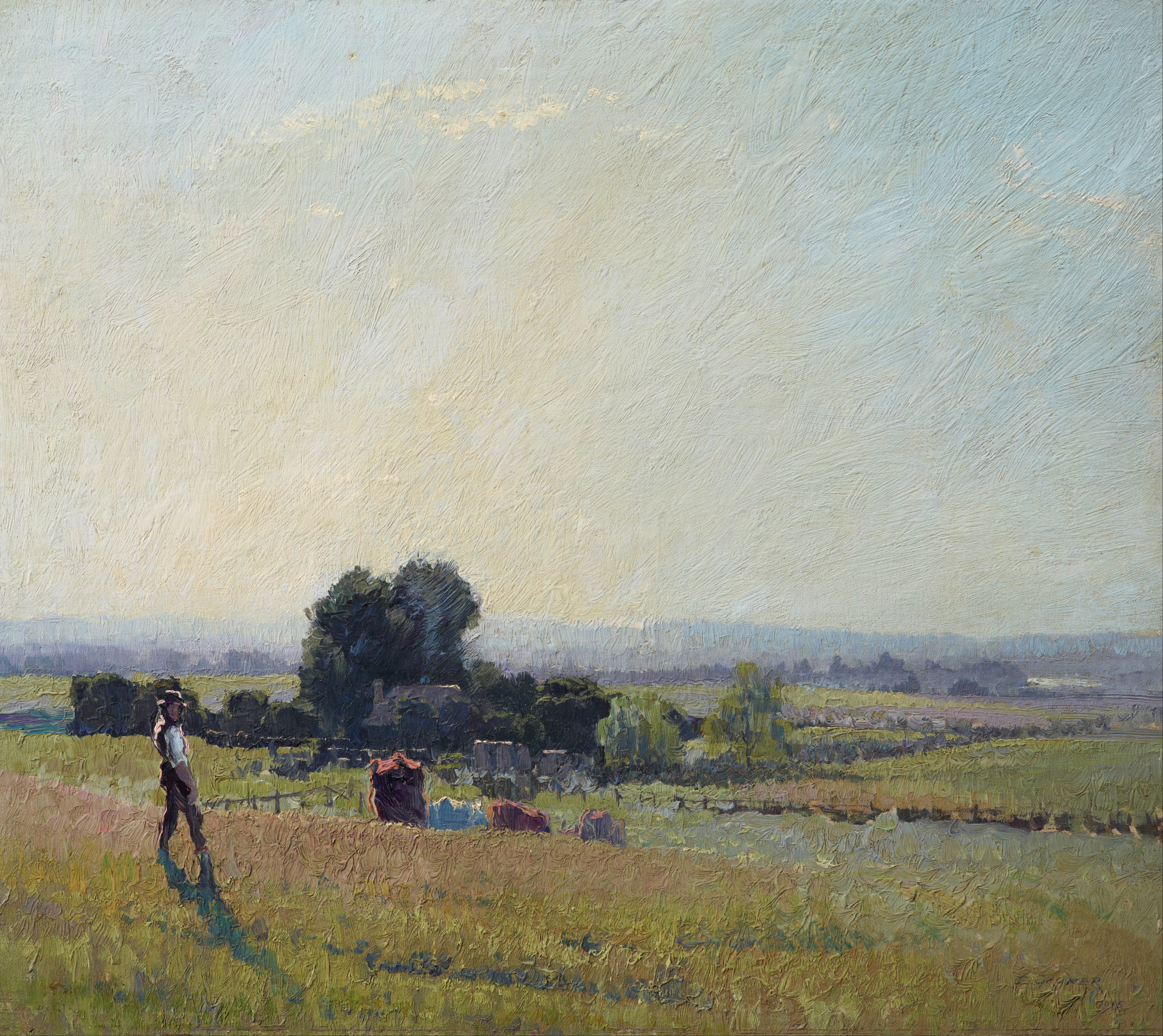
- Artist: Elioth Gruner
- Year: 1916
- Medium: oil on canvas
- Dimensions: 40.6 cm × 45.1 cm (16.0 in × 17.8 in)
- Location: Art Gallery of New South Wales, Sydney

Morning Light is a 1916 painting by the Australian artist Elioth Gruner. The painting depicts a small herd of dairy cows in a grassy field in the morning with a man, the farmer, in the foreground. Hailed as the high point of [his] Emu Plains series" and "one of his greatest masterpieces", Morning Light was awarded the Wynne Prize in 1916.

Morning Light was largely painted en plein air at Emu Plains—now an outer western suburb of Sydney but then a rural area—on a farm owned by James Innes. Elioth Gruner's 1919 painting Spring Frost also shows this farm.

Gruner was influenced by Melbourne artist Max Meldrum's tonal theory as well as the brushwork of E Phillips Fox. The work also shows influence from modernist contemporaries Grace Cossington Smith and Roland Wakelin.

The slightly elevated point of view allows for an expansive vista across the paddocks to the misted horizon line, with nearly two-thirds of the painting sky. Gruner invested the pastoral subject with both intimacy and universality; the turning figure lit by the sun draws us into the scene, which is a meditation on light and atmosphere. In the foreground the painting’s surface is animated by choppy vigorous brushwork and highlights of vivid colour, almost pulsing from the effect of the sun, which is just beyond vision

— Deborah Clark,

The work was first exhibited at the Society of Artists' annual exhibition in Sydney in November 1916 and made Gruner's reputation.

After winning the Wynne Prize the work was immediately purchased by the Art Gallery of New South Wales and remains part of its collection.
