= Spring Frost =

1919 painting by Elioth Gruner

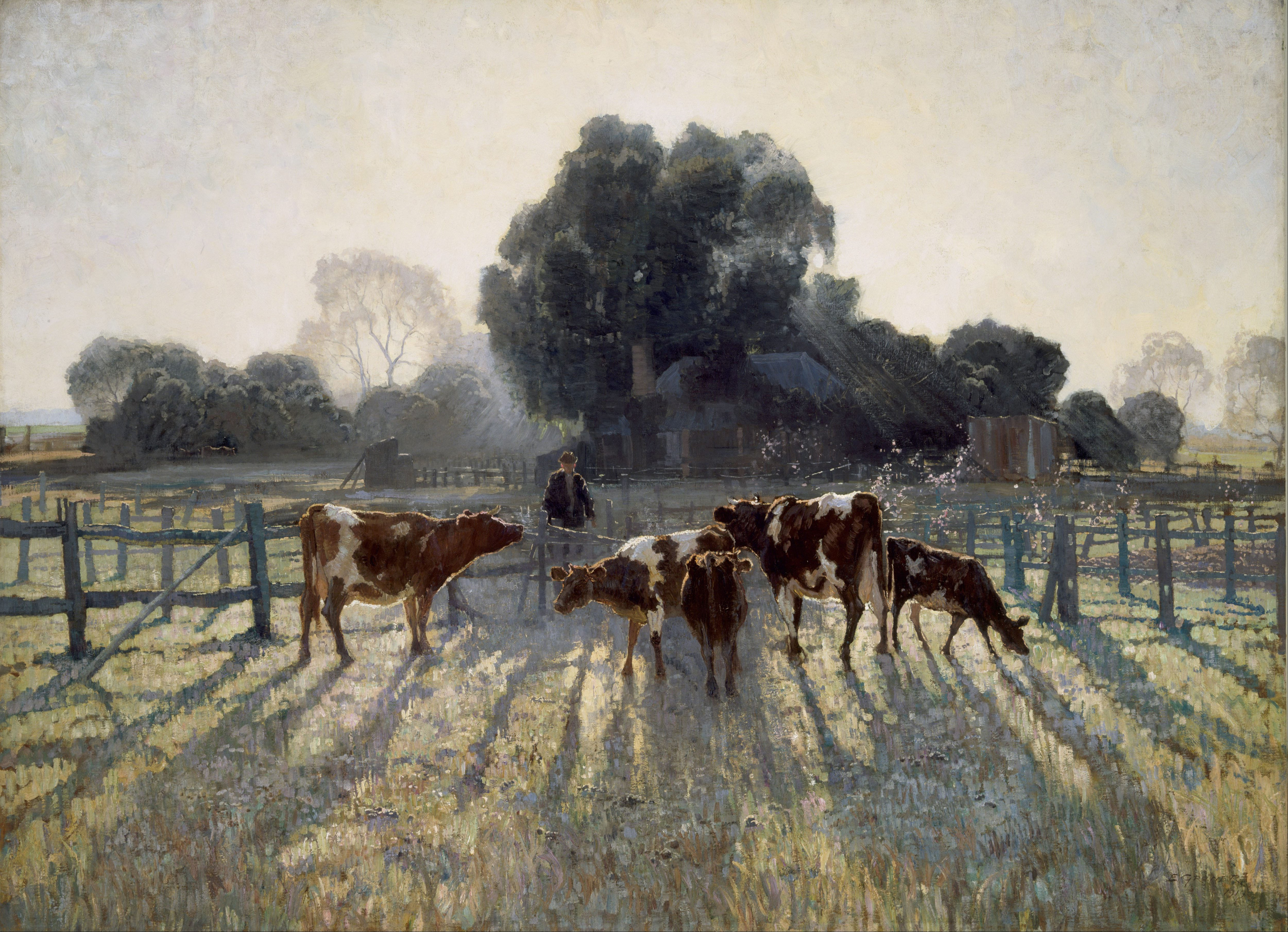
- Artist: Elioth Gruner
- Year: 1919
- Medium: oil on canvas
- Dimensions: 131.0 cm × 178.7 cm (51.6 in × 70.4 in)
- Location: Art Gallery of New South Wales; Sydney

Spring Frost is a 1919 painting by the Australian artist Elioth Gruner. The painting depicts a small herd of dairy cows in the early morning. Gruner's most well-known painting, Spring Frost was awarded the Wynne Prize in 1919.

Spring Frost was largely painted en plein air at Emu Plains—now an outer western suburb of Sydney but then a rural area—on the farm built by Isaac Innes and inherited by his son Jim Innes. It is Jim Innes in this painting with his cattle. Elioth Gruner's 1916 painting Morning Light also shows this farm. To compose the painting Gruner built a small structure on site to protect the canvas and, to avoid frostbite, he wrapped his legs with chaff bags. A 2002 article on the painting argues that the work is more "sensual" than "realistic":

There is a sense in this startling and surprisingly complex picture of a mature artist, who is also at once a wilful child, wanting to gaze directly at the sun, to revel and roll in the sun, to be exposed to, and by, the sun. In the passages where he paints its pure light, for example in the sky, shrub edges and the dew-wet grass, Gruner surrenders to this sensual, if potentially destructive, instinct. In so doing, he creates a work which is actually far less realistic than we think, less anecdotal, too.

— Sydney Morning Herald, Milking works for a moment in the sun
