= Perc Tucker Regional Gallery =

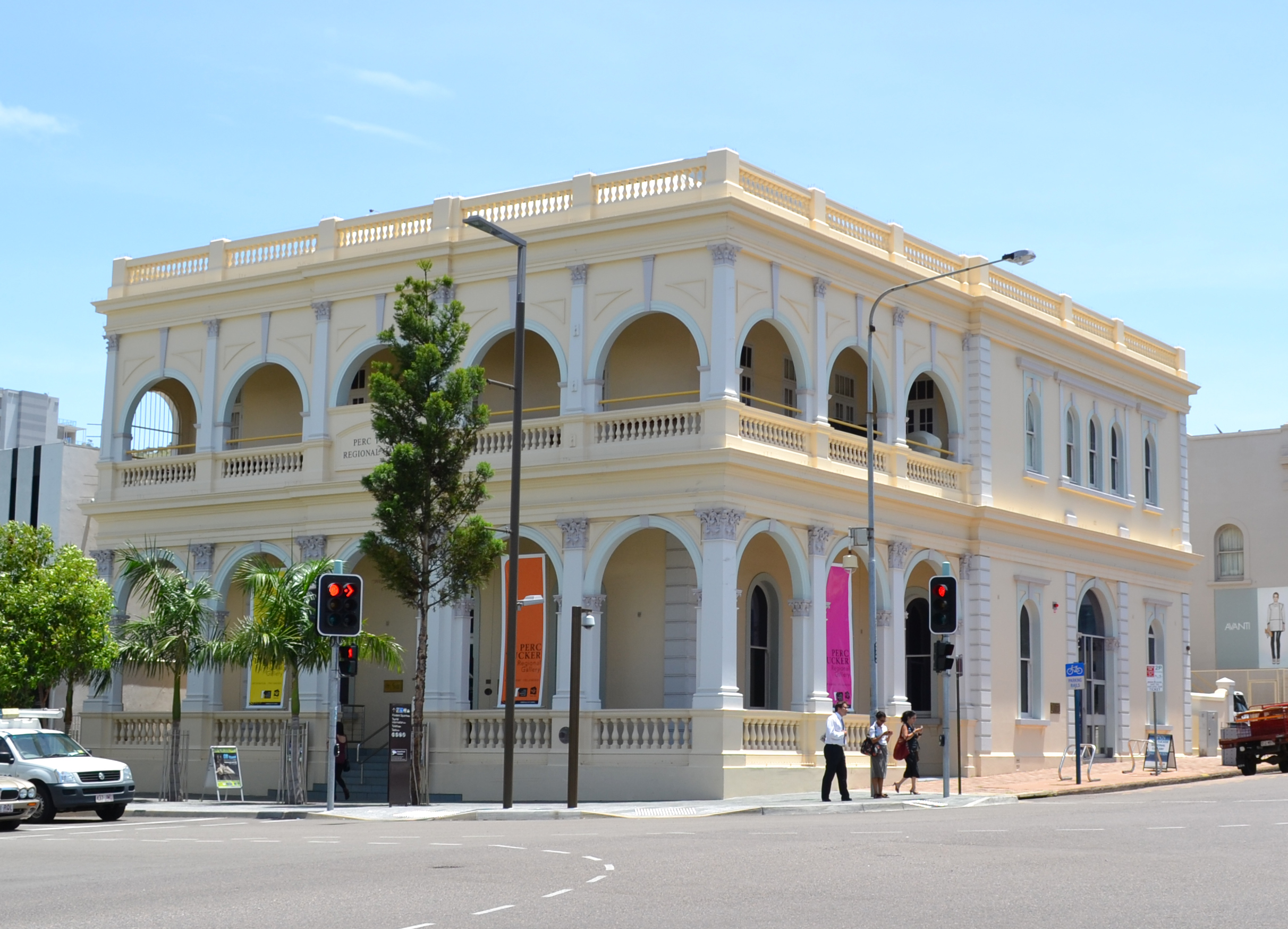
- View of corner of Perc Tucker Regional Gallery since the Flinders Street Mall Redevelopment
- Established: 1981
- Location: Corner of Flinders and Denham Streets, Townsville CBD, City of Townsville, Queensland, Australia
- Coordinates: 19.2581°S 146.8181°E
- Type: Art gallery
- Collection size: 2,000+ works
- Website: Perc Tucker Regional Gallery

Perc (pronounced purse) Tucker Regional Gallery is a heritage-listed public art gallery in the Townsville CBD, City of Townsville, Queensland, Australia.

Located on the corner of Flinders and Denham streets, the Gallery has a collection of over 2,000 artworks and hosts touring national and international exhibits. The Gallery was officially opened by the Mayor of Townsville, Alderman M F Reynolds, on 25 September 1981. The gallery focuses on artwork relevant to North Queensland and the Tropics. The collection includes Contemporary Art of Tropical Queensland, Historical Art of Tropical Queensland, Aboriginal or Torres Strait Islander Art, Contemporary Art from Papua New Guinea, Popular Art and Ephemera. Perc Tucker has both Membership and Volunteer programs for supporters. Included in regular activities are art classes, exhibition tours, artists' talks, lectures, workshops, and performances.

== Collection of artwork and exhibitions ==
The Perc Tucker Regional Gallery has established an overall theme for the collection which is reflected also in the Gallery's exhibitions, education and public relations programs. The theme is intended to give overall unity to the collection and to assist with the interpretation to the public.

The theme adopted – The Tropics – forms the central motif for the collection as a whole and relevance to this theme is the foremost criterion for the acquisition of works of art.

The Tropics, as a thematic umbrella for the entire collection, is interpreted broadly. Emphasis is placed on the construction of the tropics as an idea as well as on the tropics as a particular geographic location.

Emphasis is naturally placed on art made in the tropics which responds to the immediate environment, hence the priority given to the art of Tropical North Queensland. The Gallery also collects art made elsewhere which is seen as being relevant to ideas of cultural construction, spatial history and the identification of place.

Works in all media are held in the collection.

== Ephemera ==
Strand Ephemera
- Logo
- Dates: Dates vary
- Frequency: Biennial
- Location: The Strand, Townsville
- Inaugurated: 21 September 2001 – 30 September 2011
- Organiser: Perc Tucker Regional Gallery
- Website: Strand Ephemera

Every second year the gallery presents Ephemera which is hosted for ten days on The Strand, Townsville. The project began in 2001 in response to the redevelopment of the Strand esplanade in Townsville, and as an effort to increase the public's awareness of public art. Sculpture artworks are exhibited over the two kilometre beachfront strip. Complimenting the exhibition are a range of related activities such as guided tours, performances, art workshops, artists' talks and a public art forum.

=== History of Ephemera ===
Originally known as Strand Ephemera, the seaside sculpture exhibition went through a rebranding in 2021 in celebration of the 20th Anniversary of the exhibition and was renamed Ephemera: Seaside Sculptures. Each Ephemera so far has been an exhibition of between twenty and thirty-four artworks, being displayed for ten to twelve days each odd year. The exact dates and details vary each year.

The first Strand Ephemera was a display of twenty-six sculptures by over thirty artists. Seven permanent public artworks from the redevelopment of The Strand were also included in the marketing, these artworks were:

- Coconuts by Thierry Auriac
- Flagpoles and pennants by Thierry Auriac
- Tree Bracelets by Thierry Auriac
- Hambeluna: Spirit Rising by Lyndall Milani
- Flotsam and Jetsam I by Anne Lord
- Flotsam and Jetsam II by Anne Lord
- Mixture of memory and desire 4 by Robert Preston.

Strand Ephemera II was twelve days long, with thirty-seven sculptures and installations displayed. Yotz Watergrill and Bar Art Prize of $2,000 was awarded to Gavin Ryan for his 'Behold the Lyin' fish'.

Hosted between 2 and 11 September 2005, the third Strand Ephemera was a display of 43 works. Inspired by Manet's oil canvas painting 'Le déjeuner sur l'herbe', a new event called 'Picnic on the Grass' encouraged visitors to "bring their picnic lunch and rug" to Burke Street headland for live performances and music.

2007 was the first year that Strand Ephemera had Australia Council funding, allowing for the inclusion of five national Australian artists, with their work displayed in shipping containers along the Strand.

The fifth Strand Ephemera in 2009 was a collection of twenty-two works displayed for eleven days. Visitors could vote for their favourite artwork to win the 'Walter's IGA People's Choice Award', and enter their own photos of their works into the Strand Ephemera Photographic Competition.

Strand Ephemera VI in 2011 opened on Friday 2 September with an event attended by over 200 people; there were thirty-six works and 70,000 visitors to the eleven-day exhibition. Live components included the 'Strand aLive' performance, daily Zen raking at Helena Rador-Gibson's Zen Ephemera, and scheduled performances by 'The Lettuce Dance Band' and 'The Pink Ladies' on Jan Hynes' Strand Ephemera V artwork Pink Piano. The Artistic Excellence Award of $10,000, donated by the 'Xstrata Community Partnership Program' was awarded as a shared prize between Girrungun Artists' 'Bagu' and Jiman and Erica Gray's 'Sea Anemone'. The People's Choice Award of $2,000 was won by Aden McLeod with his 'People watching people in the spirit'.

That same year, visitors were encouraged to take photos of the artwork in Strand Ephemera VI and enter them into the Wilson/Ryan/Grose Lawyers Photographic Competition. The winner of the Eighteen Years and Over section was Danielle Leslie for her photograph of Richard Gillespie's 'The whole town is talking', and the winner of the Under Eighteen Years section was Elisa Ernst for her photograph of MJ Ryan Bennett's 'Gifts from the Sea'.

== The Percival Portrait Painting Prize ==
The Percival Portrait Painting Prize
- Awarded for: strongest portrait painted during the 12 months before the exhibition
- Country: Australia
- Presented by: Perc Tucker Regional Gallery
- First award: 2007
- Website: Percival Portrait Painting Prize

The Percival Portrait Painting Prize is a biennial portraiture award in Townsville, Queensland.

=== History of the Percivals ===
The Percival Portrait Painting Prize started 2007 in response to stalled negotiations in 2006 to show the Archibald Prize in the Gallery. The Award was named after Perc Tucker, the namesake of the Gallery. Two previous exhibitions Perc's Purses and Percival Vestments were also based on the name Perc, acting to educate the community on the correct pronunciation of Perc Tucker.

There were 122 entries to the inaugural Percival, including paintings, sculptures, prints and drawings. Following this, a decision was made on recommendation by judge Elizabeth Cross to allow only two-dimensional works in following years.

While The Percivals was proposed as an annual event following the first opening, it was after 2008 that the decision was made to run the Percival Portrait Award biennially, in alternating years to Strand Ephemera. There were 138 entries to the 2008 Award, with 35 works being chosen by judge Elizabeth Cross to be hung in the exhibition, and a further 75 works hung in a Salon des Refusés within the main gallery.

In 2010, the 124 Percival Portrait Award entries were judged by Andrew Sayers AM, and the exhibition was attended by 14,450 visitors.

=== Winners of the Percival ===
Year	Award	Prize money	Artist	Winning work
2007	Philip Leong Investments Art Award	$3,000	Barbara Cheshire	Jack
2007	Townsville City Council Highly Commended	–	Martin Kizur	Miluska Kizur – Pharmacist
2007	Townsville City Council Commended	–	Eddie Omelaniuk	Hicks and Benny
2007	Top Frames People's Choice Award	–	Catherine Ogden	Catherine
2007	Costel Vasilescu Encouragement Award for young artists under 25 years	–	Alexander Bowden	Jonathan
2007	Costel Vasilescu Encouragement Award Highly Commended	–	Clint Searston	One over three
2007	Costel Vasilescu Encouragement Award	–	Aaron Richardson	The Twisted Photocopier
2008	Xstrata Portrait Award	$5,000	Nick Mourzakis	A Portrait of Alex Wodak
2008	Phillip Leong Art Award	–	Sinclair MacLagan	Resolute: Brigadier John Caligari
2008	Sally Elliott Award	–	Catherine Odgen	Sally
2008	Xstrata Encouragement Award	–	Yasmin Fisher	Kath
2008	Costel Vasilescu Encouragement for Young Artists & Marion O'Shea Encouragement Award	–	Peter Wright	Mac Core
2008	Top Frames People's Choice Award	–	Jan Hynes	The Artist and his Dog
2010	Xstrata Portrait Award	$20,000	Ted May	Tate Adams
2010	Costel Vasilescu People's Choice Award	$2,000	Ann Cape	Welcome Home
2012	Xstrata Portrait Award	$40,000	Kevin Lincoln	Self Portrait
2012	Ergon Energy People's Choice Award	$2,000	Jun Chen	David North
2012	Costel Vasilescu People's Unpackers Prize	$1,000	Donna Beningfield	The Beginning
2014	Glencore Percival Portrait Painting Prize	$40,000	Francis Giacco	Charles Blackman
2014	DUO Magazine Percival Photographic Portrait Prize	$10,000	Roderick McNicol	The Late Blossoming of Jack Charles
2014	Glencore People's Choice Award	$2,000	Robert Douma	Red
2016	Glencore Percival Portrait Painting Prize	$40,000	Lisa Adams	Revelation
2016	Glencore People's Choice Award	$1,000	Tessa McOnie	Untitled
2016	Townsville 150th Anniversary Portrait Painting Award	$10,000	Barbara Cheshire	I Remember
2016	DUO Magazine Percival Photographic Portrait Prize	$10,000	Brett Canet-Gibson	The Life of Riley
2016	DUO Magazine People's Choice Award	$1,000	Rosanna Kersh	Big Kahuna

Major Award
Other prizes and awards

== History ==
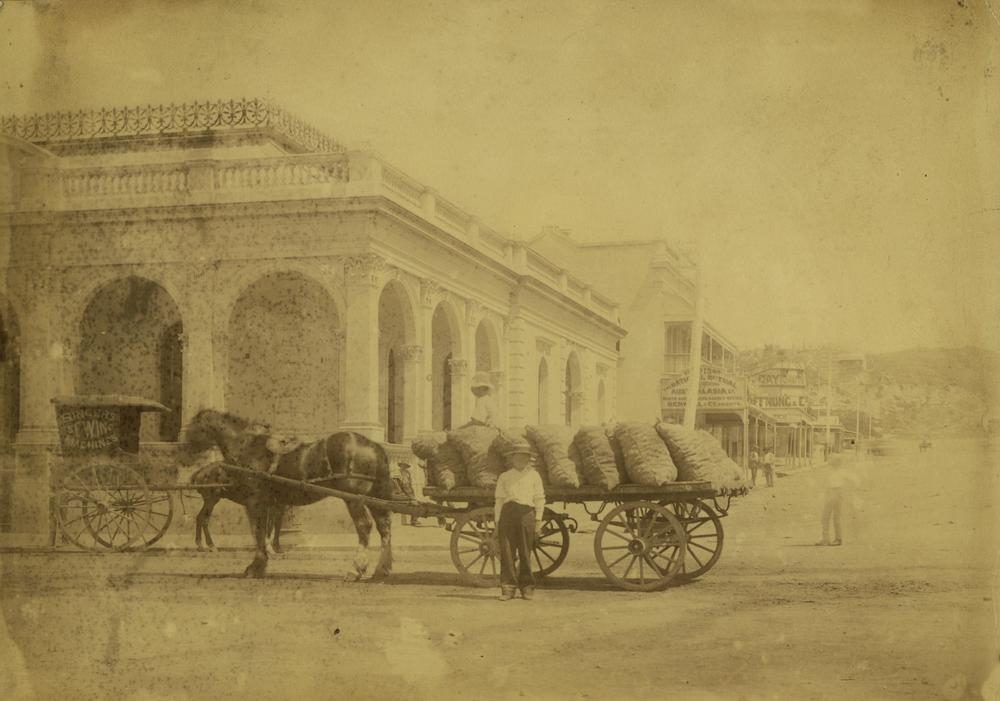
Union Bank of Australia, Townsville building in 1890

The Building which is now host to Perc Tucker Regional Gallery was built by the Union Bank of Australia in 1885 for their northern headquarters. Designed by colonial architect F.D.G. Stanley the building was single story until a second story was added in the early 1930s. The Union Bank eventually became the Australia and New Zealand Banking Group and in the building was its regional headquarters until 1980 when Townsville City Council purchased the heritage building as a venue for Townsville's first public art gallery. The Queensland Government subsidised the initial purchase, however the majority of funding both for the foundation and operating costs of the gallery have been funded by the Local Government Authority.

Perc Tucker Regional Gallery was opened by then Townsville Mayor Mike Reynolds in 1981 and named after former Mayor, Alderman Perc Tucker.

The building was added to the Queensland Heritage Register on 21 October 1992.

=== Perc Tucker ===
Tucker was a significant North Queensland politician; he was elected as the State Member for North Townsville 1960 and went on to become the Leader of the Labor Party Opposition to the Bjelke-Petersen Government in the Queensland Parliament. In 1974 he lost his seat of North Townsville, but he moved into the role of Mayor of Townsville in 1976. On top the usual Council responsibilities of roads, drains, sewerage and water-reticulation his administration's achievements included; second stage of the Ross River Dam, the design and construction of the Townsville Civic Theatre, the development of Flinders Mall and the planning for the gallery which was to become commonly known as 'Perc Tucker' to future generations of Townsvillians. Tucker died in office on 20 August 1980.
