= Yvonne Audette =

Australian abstract artist (born 1930)

Yvonne Audette AM
- Born: 22 April 1930 (age 96); Sydney, New South Wales, Australia
- Known for: Abstract artist

Yvonne Audette AM (born 22 April 1930) is an Australian abstract artist.

== Life ==
Audette was born in Sydney, Australia, in 1930 and after attending art classes while still attending the private school Ascham, she and her American-born parents were persuaded to have her trained as an artist as it was considered she showed "promise". Audette benefited early from travel to the United States in 1948 and as an attractive young woman, she became somewhat of a spokeswoman for the American fashion she had seen on her visit. As early as 1949, it was noted her "pet ambition was to become a painter". She had enrolled at the Julian Ashton Art School but she became tired of the uninspiring teaching. The main teacher was Henry Gibbons who was nearing retirement. In 1951, his duties were taken over by John Passmore, who was returning to Australia.

Passmore became the main teacher at this private school. One of his favourite students was Audette. She compared his return to the school as "like Moses" returning with the tablets of stone. He taught her to look at the subject of their paintings as not only a connection of rods, but also as a collection of facets and as a creation of basis mathematical shapes. The workaholic Passmore enthused about Cezanne and passed his, and the views of Cezanne on tone and structure onto Audette.

Audette, however, found Passmore a difficult person. He worked hard on his own work but it was kept in a separate room and his students were not allowed to see it.

Passmore would play the male students off against Audette playing psychological games. Audette was not part of the main artistic group. This was partly due to her well-to-do parents who supplied her with her own flat. Audette did some work as a model for the Australian photographers David Moore and Max Dupain.

In 1952, Audette moved to New York, then the heart of abstract expressionism which in turn became a strong underlying influence on how she styled her art for the future. In New York she became acquainted with Mark Rothko, Louise Nevelson, Willem de Kooning and Lee Krasner. Travelling to Europe in 1955 to see what was happening there, Audette created her own studio in Milan after a brief period in Florence. Here she observed a different type of expressionism: more subtle and softer. She travelled to the United Kingdom, the Netherlands, France, Spain, Greece and Germany before returning to her home city of Sydney in 1966, establishing a studio in Rose Bay. Her first exhibition was with Robert Klippel at the Bonython Gallery. When asked why she had returned from Europe she observed there was no simple answer "but I can only say it was the call of the soil". Her portrait of Klippel, entered and exhibited in the 1980 Archibald Prize has been gifted to the National Portrait Gallery. From 1969, she was working in Melbourne.

== Mid and late career ==
Mid-career may have proven difficult for Audette, especially when the unnamed art critic of the Canberra Times wrote rather disparagingly of an exhibition at the Solander Gallery, Yarralumla in 1975. They described her landscape works as a departure from her usual abstract style, and as being "sentimental" and "dewy and lovely" but felt they were dangerously close to "cheap illustrations and calendar art".

The following year, the Canberra Times art critic Geoffrey de Groen described Audette's works as being "playful, sensitive and enjoyable", and he found her work less decorative. The works exhibited had been painted between 1959 and 1968 and he was quite complimentary on her choice of hard board as a surface for her oil paint which she applied heavily and worked quite hard.

Audette's profile was raised by a major exhibition in 1999 in Queensland and the publication of a book about her life and works. The National Portrait Gallery has quoted a description of her as "Australia's greatest living abstract painter". In her own words, she said 'Art is a language' and 'painting is a way to commune with the essential mystery behind all things.'

Audette's "significant service to the arts as an abstract painter" was recognised by the awarding of an AM in the Queen's Birthday 2020 Honours List.

Her work, The long walk, was shown in Part Two of the exhibition, "Know my name: Australian women artists 1900 to now" at the National Gallery of Australia.
