= Julian Ashton Art School =

Art school in Sydney, Australia

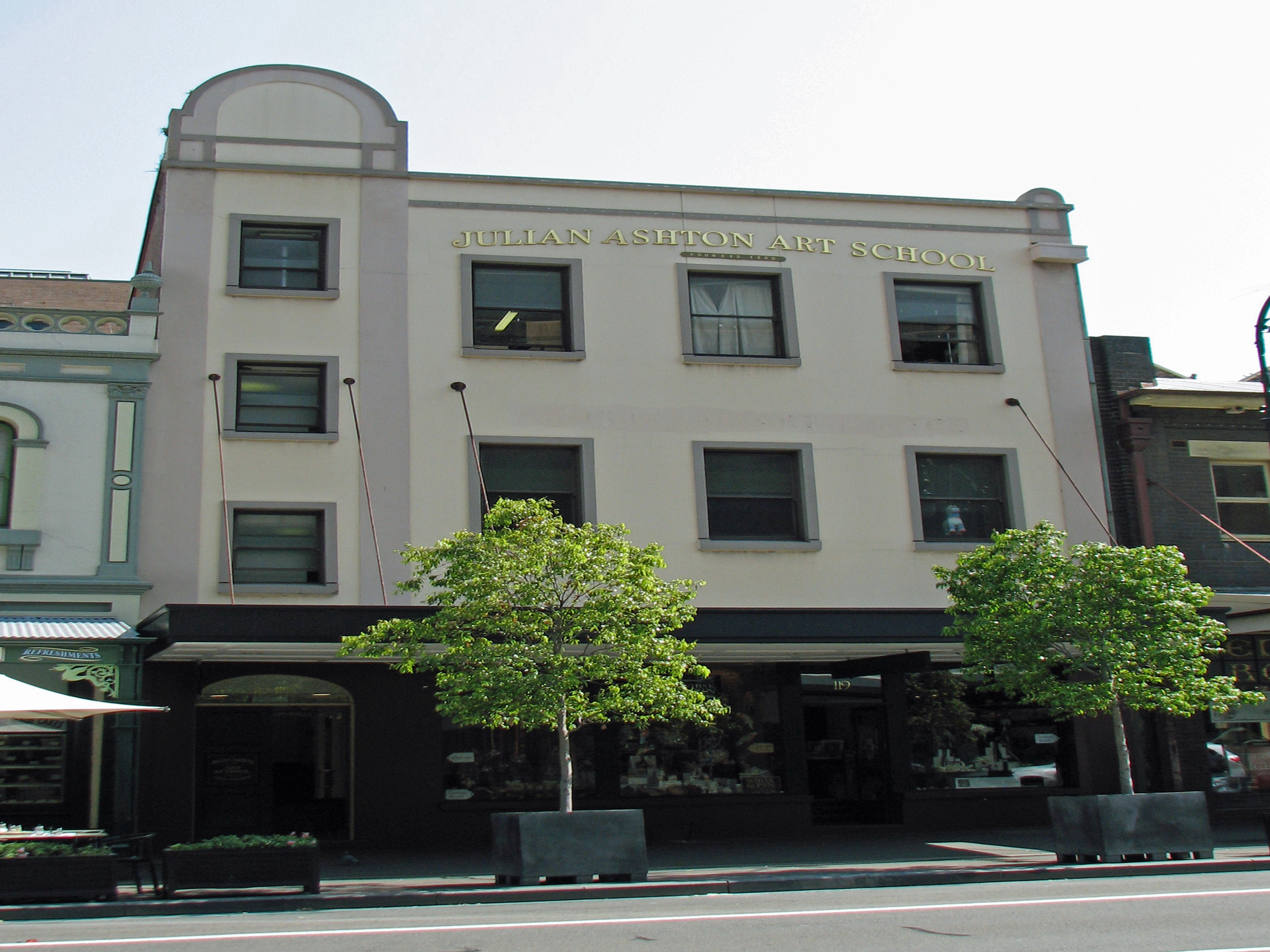
Julian Ashton Art School building, George Street, The Rocks

The Julian Ashton Art School was established by Julian Ashton in 1890 as the "Academy Julian", (perhaps a reference to the Académie Julian in Paris) has been an influential art school in Australia. For a long time it was known as the Sydney Art School.

The Julian Ashton Art School building, and some of its equipment, have been heritage listed, in part due to the significance of the school itself.

== History ==
After Julian Ashton died in 1942, the school was run by Henry Gibbons (1884–1972). Henry Gibbons had started at the school as a student in April 1919 and soon became the teacher of the night drawing classes. In 1924 Gibbons proposed starting a Saturday afternoon class so that he could teach some of the night drawing students to paint. The Saturday class started in February 1924 and the first nine students were Dobell, Dundas, Passmore, Badham, Lawrence, Brackenreg, Byrne, Hubble and Cox. Gibbons taught many winners of the NSW Traveling Arts Scholarship. Henry Gibbons retired in 1960.

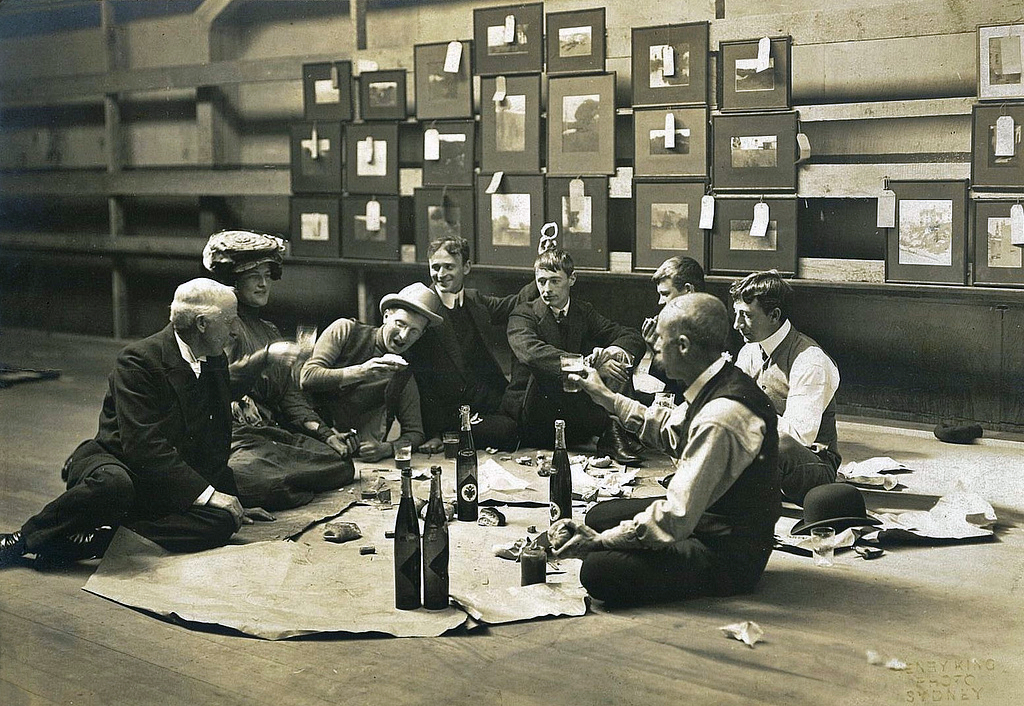
Photograph by Henry King showing members of the Society of Artists' 1907 Selection Committee, including Julian Ashton (far left) and Norman Lindsay (fifth from left)

Howard Ashton's son, J. Richard Ashton, and his wife Wenda ran the School from 1960, when, among many gifted artists, Ian Chapman and Archibald Prize winner Francis Giacco attended, until 1977 when Phillip Ashton (Richard's son) became Principal, this being the time of Hadyn Wilson, political cartoonist Bill Leak and artist Paul Newton.

In 1988 the school was incorporated and Paul Delprat, Julian Ashton's great-grandson, himself an ex-student took over the running of the school, becoming the current principal. In 1989 the school's antique casts and easels, which date back to 1890, were classified by the National Trust. The school's main campus is in The Rocks, Sydney, located opposite the Museum of Contemporary Art Australia at 117-119 George Street, The Rocks. The building is listed on the New South Wales State Heritage Register. Since 2004 the school has also conducted classes at Headland Park, Georges Heights, Mosman.

== Notable alumni ==
Julian Ashton students have included Elioth Gruner, George Lambert, B. E. Minns, Thea Proctor, Adrian Feint, Howard Ashton (Julian's son), Dorrit Black, J. J. Hilder, William Dobell, Edmund Arthur Harvey, Eric Wilson, Quinton Tidswell, Jean Bellette, Douglas Dundas, Arthur Freeman, William Dadswell, John Passmore, Yvonne Audette, Joshua Smith, John Olsen, Michael Johnston, Jim Russell, Florence Turner Blake, Harry Julius, Sydney Ure Smith, Alexander McKenzie, Brett Whiteley, Susan Dorothea White, Nigel Thomson, Graeme Townsend, Nora Heysen, Salvatore Zofrea, Helen Stewart, Madge Tennent, Don Peebles, Anne Dangar and Nelle Rodd.

The poet Lola Ridge (1873–1941) also studied with Julian Ashton.

Recognising the early talent of Ray Wenban, Ashton taught him gratis, helping him become a respected and successful painter and illustrator.

Samuel Wade, a Brett Whiteley Scholarship winner at the school, went on to win the Brett Whiteley Travelling Art Scholarship at the Art Gallery of New South Wales.

== Notable principals and teachers ==
- Julian Ashton, founder
- Sydney Long, a second in command
- Francis Giacco, a teacher
- Elioth Gruner, a second in command
- Paul Delprat, a principal
- Henry Gibbons, a principal
- Thea Proctor, a teacher
