= Francis Giacco =

Australian artist (born 1955)

Francis Giacco (born 1955) is an Australian artist who won the Archibald Prize in 1994 with Homage to John Reichard. Giacco has a Bachelor of Architecture from the UNSW and is a longtime teacher at the Julian Ashton Art School, The Rocks, Sydney. His classes are characterized by a structured and logical approach to the tradition of classical drawing and painting techniques.

He had been a finalist the previous year, with his portrait of SBS newsreader, Lee Lin Chin

In 2014 he won the Percival Portrait Painting Prize, with a portrait of Charles Blackman.

Awards
Preceded by Garry Shead	Archibald Prize; 1993/94 for Homage to John Reichard	Succeeded by William Robinson
