= Newcastle Technical College =

- Abbreviation: NTC
- Type: Private limited company (technical and vocational education)
- Headquarters: London, England, United Kingdom
- Region served: United Kingdom, United States, Sudan, Egypt
- Website: newcastletechcollege-ac.uk

Newcastle Technical College (NTC) is a private provider of technical, vocational and professional education based in London, England. The college delivers classroom-based and online programmes and operates regional offices in Sudan and Egypt. The college has established legal entities in both England and Wales and the United States.

== Legal Status ==
Newcastle Technical College Ltd (company number 16674380) is registered at Companies House in England and Wales, with a registered office at 71–75 Shelton Street, Covent Garden, London WC2H 9JQ. The company was incorporated on 27 August 2025 and is classified under SIC codes 85320 (Technical and vocational secondary education), 85421 (First-degree level higher education), and 85422 (Post-graduate level higher education).

A company named Newcastle Technical College (company number 07464721) was previously incorporated in England and Wales on 9 December 2010 as a private company limited by guarantee, and was subsequently dissolved.

A separate legal entity, Newcastle Technical College, LLC, was incorporated in the State of Delaware, United States, on 13 July 2015. The company's registered office is located at 16192 Coastal Highway, Lewes, Delaware 19958, County of Sussex, with Harvard Business Services, Inc. serving as the registered agent.

== History ==
A company bearing the name Newcastle Technical College was incorporated in England and Wales on 9 December 2010. The college established regional offices in Khartoum, Sudan, and Cairo, Egypt.

In August 2018, the college signed a cooperation protocol with Sohag University in Egypt to collaborate on continuing nursing training. Under the agreement, students from Sudan were to receive practical training at Sohag University's nursing faculty, while the college undertook to send specialists to deliver courses at its Khartoum premises and to facilitate participation in regional conferences. The protocol was signed by the university's secretary-general on behalf of the university president, and by Mohammed Al-Hassan Abu Bakr, described as the college's director.

The college's Khartoum premises sustained material damage during the armed conflict that began in Sudan in April 2023. The college's administration subsequently stated its intention to resume operations at that location.

== Campuses and Operations ==
The college's registered office in the United Kingdom is located in London, England. Regional offices are maintained in Khartoum, Sudan, and Cairo, Egypt. The Khartoum office sustained damage during the Sudanese conflict that began in April 2023.

== Partnerships ==
In 2018, the college signed a formal cooperation protocol with Sohag University (Egypt) covering continuing nursing training.

In June 2026, Newcastle Education Group was reported as an official academic partner of the Arab Digital Skills Initiative 2026, a regional programme organised under the Union of Arab Technical Experts and Consultants. The initiative offered a 120-hour training programme in five digital disciplines: artificial intelligence, software development, data science and the Internet of Things, networking and cybersecurity, and digital arts and marketing.

The college has also collaborated with the Al Jazeera Media Institute in Doha, Qatar, on a professional broadcast journalism fellowship programme. The fellowship, titled "Professional News Anchor Fellowship", was offered in partnership with the college's media department and accredited by the American Board of Professional Media Practitioners. Participants received a joint certificate from the Al Jazeera Media Institute and the college's regional administration upon completion.

== Academic Conferences and Research ==
In December 2017, a representative of Newcastle Technical College presented a research paper at the Ninth Annual Conference of the Arab Organization for Quality Assurance in Education (AROQA ), held at the headquarters of the League of Arab States in Cairo, Egypt, on 3–4 December 2017. The conference, held under the patronage of Ahmed Aboul-Gheit, Secretary-General of the League of Arab States, was themed "Quality Assurance and Accreditation: Challenges and Prospects".

The college also participated in the First International Conference of the Quality Assurance Centre at Sohag University, held in Hurghada, Egypt, under the theme "Arab Universities in View of Knowledge Economy, Entrepreneurship and Quality Assurance". A research paper titled "Newcastle Technical College's Experience in Delivering and Scaling Vocational Specialisation Programmes Across Different Age Groups" was presented at the conference.

In January 2018, the college launched the "Training for All" initiative in Khartoum, Sudan, under the patronage of Sudan's Ministry of Human Resource Development. The initiative was announced at a media forum held at Taiba Press Hall, Khartoum, on 6 January 2018.
