= Mirka Mora =

Australian artist (1928–2018)

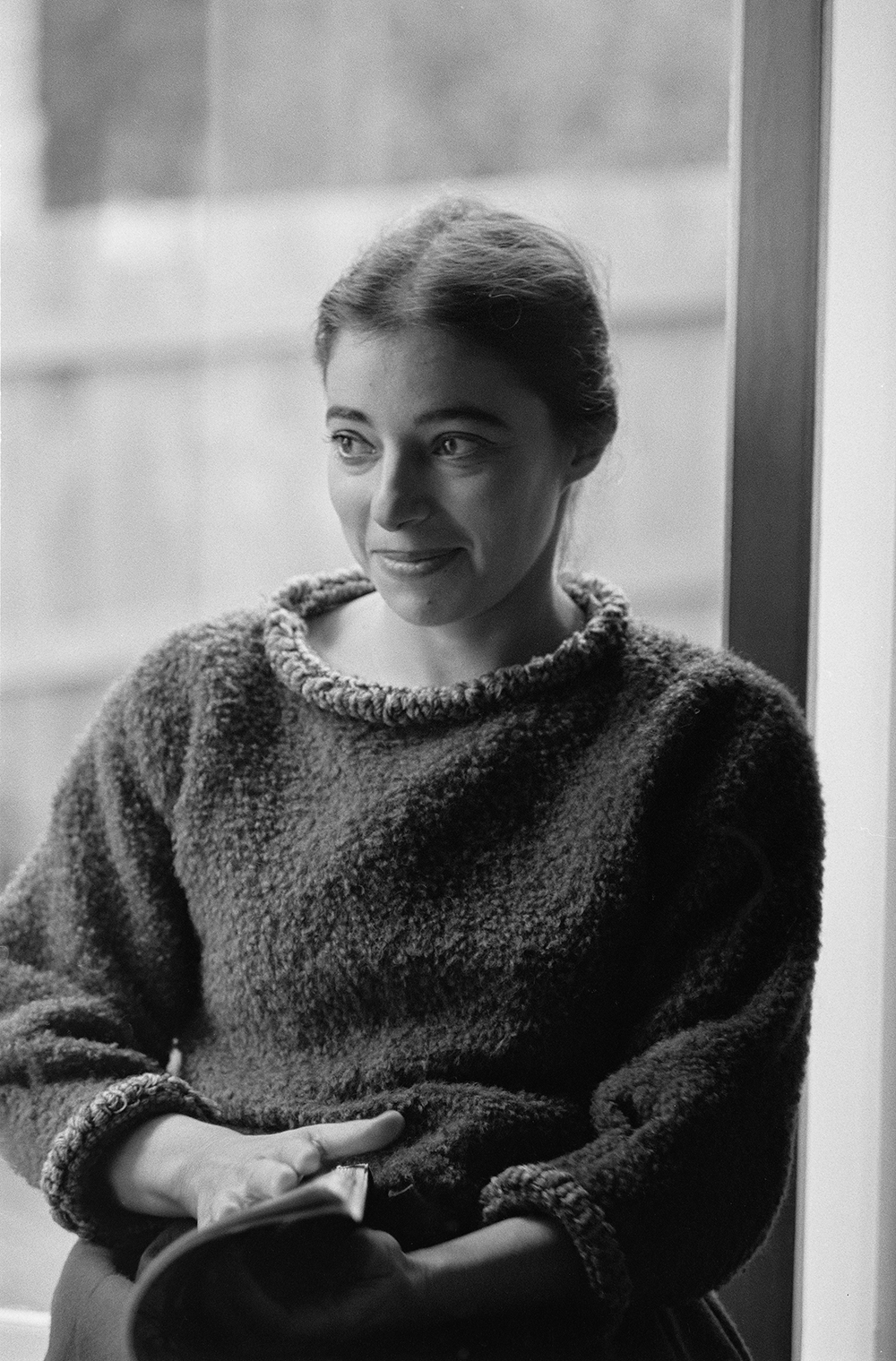
- Mora in 1961
- Born: Mirka Madeleine Zelik; 18 March 1928; Paris, France
- Died: 27 August 2018 (aged 90); Melbourne, Victoria, Australia
- Education: Self-taught
- Known for: Painting, Sculpture, Mosaics
- Awards: Officier de l'Ordre des Arts et des Lettres

Mirka Madeleine Mora (née Zelik; 18 March 1928 – 27 August 2018) was a French-born Australian visual artist and cultural figure who contributed significantly to the development of Australian contemporary art. Her media included drawing, painting, sculpture and mosaic.

== Early life ==
Mirka Mora was born on 18 March 1928 in Paris to a Lithuanian Jewish father, Leon Zelik, and a Romanian Jewish mother, Celia Gelbein. She was arrested in 1942 during the Vel' d'Hiv Roundup (Rafle du Vel' d'Hiv). Her father, Leon, managed to arrange for her release from the concentration camp at Pithiviers (Loiret) before Mora and her mother were scheduled to be deported to Auschwitz. The family evaded arrest and deportation from 1942 to 1945 by hiding in the forests of France. After the war, 17-year-old Mirka met a wartime resistance fighter Georges Mora in Paris. They married in 1947. In an interview in 2004, Mora said:

I really wanted to make love to him, because I was very humiliated that he didn't because I was 17, and he said, "I know that you are not happy but we have to wait till we get married." "Ah! Married?" So I agreed to get married to lose my virginity. That's true.

== Migration to Australia ==
Having survived the Holocaust, Mirka Mora and her husband migrated to Australia in 1951 in order to settle in Melbourne. They chose Melbourne over Casablanca or Saigon because Mirka had read about it in Henri Murger's novel Scènes de la Vie de Bohème, in which a young Parisian photographer (probably based by Murger on Antoine Fauchery) travels to Melbourne to make his fortune. They occupied studios in Grosvenor Chambers in the 'Paris End' of Collins Street, and quickly became key figures on the Melbourne cultural scene. Mirka worked initially as a dressmaker while also making art, and Georges became an influential art dealer, in 1967 with his flair and entrepreneurship adding the Tolarno Galleries to Melbourne's only very select number of commercial art galleries.

The Mora family also owned and operated three significant Melbourne cafés. The Mirka Café was opened by Jean Sablon in December 1954 at 183 Exhibition Street and was the venue for the first major solo exhibition by Joy Hester. It was followed by the Café Balzac at 62 Wellington Parade, East Melbourne and then by the Tolarno in Fitzroy Street in St Kilda, which opened in 1966, and where Mirka created a bas-relief behind the bar and painted murals on walls and windows of the restaurant and bistro, hallway and toilets, over the period 1965 to 1978. All three were focal points for Melbourne's bohemian subculture. As Mora's son Philippe recalls, "my parents literally fed artists at our home and in our restaurants". In a 2004 interview, Mora stated:

Actually, the Mirka Cafe got too big, because too many people came and couldn't get in. And so we opened the Balzac Restaurant and the Balzac Restaurant was really the toast of Melbourne. It was a beautiful restaurant. But it was my husband's work of art and I only came in the restaurant to help when my husband went overseas. My husband always tried to find a big house so I could have a big studio. So one day my husband came and said, "I have bought a hotel." I did get a big studio for one week, then I had to give it to my husband for his gallery. (Laughs) And then I went on the first floor, where I had the bridal room, which was a beautiful studio.

The Mora family's social circle included many progressive Australian artists and writers: Charles Blackman and Barbara Blackman, Fred Williams, John Perceval, Albert Tucker, Barrett Reid, Laurence Hope, Arthur Boyd and Joy Hester. The Mora family were especially close friends with renowned art patrons John and Sunday Reed, and spent many weekends at their famous home and artists' colony "Heide" (now the Heide Museum of Modern Art) in the Melbourne suburb of Bulleen, and at the Reeds' beach house next door to the Moras' own in Aspendale.

Mora had three children who were to find their place as a film director, Philippe Mora, an art dealer, William Mora, and an actor, Tiriel Mora. "Culturally privileged" is Philippe's epithet in describing their childhood. After extramarital relationships on both sides, Mirka eventually separated from Georges.

== Art: style and reception ==
After coming to Australia in 1951, three years later Mora had become well known in art circles in Melbourne and, with patron friends John and Sunday Reed, was instrumental in reviving the Contemporary Art Society there. Mirka and Georges Mora, through the Contemporary Art Society and with Italian Gino Nibbi (1896–1969) who showed Tucker and Nolan at his Galleria di Quattro Venti in Rome, made strenuous efforts to have Australia accepted for the first time into the Venice Biennale, urging the inclusion of contemporary art to promote its alignment with Modernist practice of Australian immigrant artists from Europe and their influence on a reinvigoration of the country's art.

Though they secured an exhibition, it was not a success, as the conservative Commonwealth Arts Advisory Board maintained control over the entries, sending outdated examples of the Heidelberg School and a few Arthur Boyd landscapes. The episode exacerbated the split between the traditionalist and modernist groups, and it was not until 1978 that Australia was finally represented at Venice under the auspices of the Australian Arts Council.

From 1954, Mora exhibited mainly with the CAS and in the Heide Museum of Modern Art, Douglas Galleries and Tolarno Galleries in Melbourne, and with Watters Gallery in Sydney.

Mora innovatively used a wide range of media and large numbers of her works are in the permanent collection of the Heide Museum of Modern Art, in the National Gallery of Australia in the National Gallery of Victoria. They are also available to view in public places; in an external mural in Acland Street, St Kilda, a mosaic seat on the St Kilda foreshore, and as a mixed-media mural prominently displayed at Flinders Street station in Melbourne. The latter is nine metres long and about four meters high in three different techniques in the same artwork: painting in the upper register, mosaic in the middle, a larger one, and painted low relief at the pavement level. Completed in 1986, in 1998, Mora restored the eroded lower part of the mural.

Mora participated with Bruce Petty, Reg Mombassa, Ginger Riley and others in the production of the Federation Tapestry Suite in Melbourne Museum coordinated by artist Murray Walker and executed by the Victorian Tapestry Workshop to mark the Australian Centenary of Federation in 2001. In the sixth panel, she portrays Aboriginal leader Charles Perkins conversing with three white Australians. Other major commissions include a painted Melbourne tram (1978), sets, costumes and masks for the ballet, Ivan the Terrible (1964), and the operas Medea and Bacchae (1979–80), and 85 1.5m puppets for the opera Bennelong.

A noted colourist and symbolist, Mora's paintings are often bright and bold, constantly reinventing a repertoire of recurring motifs—innocent, wide-eyed children, angels, dogs, cats, snakes and birds, and hybrids of animals and humans.

The highest price achieved for a Mirka Mora work was $120,000, in a private sale, with works on paper often fetching $15,000.

=== Critical assessment ===
Perceptions of Mora's work have evolved against the background of the Australian art scene and its changing levels of sophistication. Donald Brook, in reviewing the 1964 Paintings by the Aleph Group describes Mora's work as one of only two that were 'distinctively Jewish'. Patrick McCaughey in 1967 emphasised the 'magical' qualities of her art;

Her fantasies are not an escape from the world but a way of participating in it. They redeem it from mundaneity [sic], transforming it into a magical zone where we may glimpse an angel walking unaware or a bird comforting a girl...they enhance it for us with their compassion, gentleness and sympathy.

Robin Wallace-Crabbe, in his 1968 Canberra Times, critique 'Giving away high-mindedness' of Mora's show at the Australian Sculpture Gallery, Narrabundah, hints that though 'delightful' her work is naïve, "like a mixture of May Gibbs' 'Snugglepot and Cuddlepie' and the prevailing Melbourne style in the early fifties", while later, in 1981, Sonja Kaleski is more favourably analytical in her review 'Vibrant, Volatile Artist', in The Canberra Times:

"[Mora's] own artistic style has had little to do with contemporary art movements, but has grown out of a need to explore her own life through the medium of fantastic imagery. She became widely known to the public after her exhibition of dolls in 1971 at Realities Gallery, Melbourne, and the dolls have been a major means of expression for her since that time. But these dolls are more than just a means of artistic expression—they are her friends and mentors and she can hardly bear to sell them."

Mora's works and commentary on them have appeared in Australian Drawings by Elwyn Lynn, New painting, 1952–62 by John Reed, The Vital Decade by co-authors Geoffrey Dutton and Max Harris, and the Encyclopedia of Australian Art by Alan McCulloch.

When Mora showed with Jean Dubuffet and Francois Mezzapelle in In Pursuit of Fantasy opening 18 October 1997 at George Gallery 129 Fitzroy Street, St. Kilda, Melbourne, the French language Le Courrier Australien reported that the vernissage was attended by 800 people, and described her work;

[For] Mirka Mora, already well known widely in Australia the themes of the relations between humans and the duality between animality and humanity seem to be her constant preoccupations. Paintings of great sensitivity where humour, too, is often present, undoubtedly reflecting the exceptional personality of this great artist Mirka Mora. Numerous paintings from 1957 to 1992 and notably Little Lovers (1970), are emblematic representations of the animal fusion of lovers that is also found in Love Quarrel (1991)

Heidi curator Kendrah Morgan in a 2011 education kit listed Mora's wide range of influences:

"from the theatrical traditions of the Surrealists and the Comédies Italiennes, to the work of the European modernist masters, classical mythology, fairy tales, child and outsider art, and the toys and dolls of her Russian folkloric heritage."

Mora's critical reputation has remained steady after her death. In The Age, Peter Millard calls her ‘an artist, cultural figure and icon’, while James Antoniou of The Australian describes her as ‘an artist of the city and an artist of the people’, and ‘one of the most colourful’ of Australian artists. In a 2020 interview with Carolyn Webb of The Age, Mora's son William noted that his mother's paintings can express ‘each person’s humanity and diversity’, and noted the ways in which they resonate with the current Black Lives Matter movement.

== Teaching ==
For many years Mora conducted workshops in painting, soft sculpture and mosaics, where countless Australians learned from her unique approach to teaching art. She travelled also to France, the USA and Japan to present her workshops.

== Later life and death ==
Mora lived and worked in a number of studios in Melbourne, including Rankins Lane. She appeared in an early 1970 film by Paul Cox and his Prahran College students, and as an interviewee on the ABC's conversational television programs Agony Aunts and The Agony of Life in 2012 and 2013. In 2016 Mora, for a long time a contributor of design to the fashion industry, collaborated with Australian fashion company Gorman to launch a 23 piece collection based on four artworks. Her murals survive on the walls of the Tolarno restaurant and gallery she previously owned in St Kilda, and, a mosaic, at Flinders Street Station adjacent to Princes Bridge.

In 2016, an East Melbourne bar-owner uncovered a lost mural on the wall of his establishment, previously the Café Balzac.

Mora died, aged 90, at her home in Melbourne on 27 August 2018. Her life was celebrated in a State Memorial, attended by over 1200 people at the Palais de Danse, a landmark for her in St Kilda. She was the first female artist to receive a Victorian State Memorial.

== Honours ==
In 2002, Mora was made an Officier de l'Ordre des Arts et des Lettres by the French Minister of Culture and Communication. Mirka Lane in St Kilda, off Barkly Street near the intersections of Grey and Inkerman Streets was named after the artist.

== Exhibitions ==
Mora's first public showing was of three circus clown paintings on masonite at Tye's Gallery in their commemorative exhibition of the Contemporary Art Society by 86 of its members 6–23 April 1954 She went on to have more than 35 solo exhibitions throughout her career, most in five galleries; the Contemporary Art Society, Heidi Museum of Modern Art, Douglas Galleries, Tolarno Galleries, and Watters Gallery. An important retrospective Mirka Mora: where angels fear to tread: 50 years of art 1948–1998 was held at Heide Museum of Art 1999–2000 to celebrate 50 years of her work. Mirka Mora: Charcoals 1958–1965 featured in the Melbourne Art Fair 2018, from 2–5 August, just prior to her death.

Other exhibitions include:

- Mirka Mora paintings 1966–2012, 1–5 August 2012, Melbourne Art Fair, Royal Exhibition Building, Melbourne
- Mirka Goes West, July 2009, Short St Gallery, 7 Short Street, Chinatown, Broome, WA.
- Women at Watters, (group show) 22 February 1995 – 11 March 1995, Watters Gallery, East Sydney, NSW
- Mirka Mora, 1990, Arthouse, Launceston, Tasmania, An exhibition of 42 oil paintings, drawings and embroideries.
- Exhibition of painted fabrics and dolls, 29 August – 12 September 1979, at the David Jones Art Gallery, 6th floor, Elizabeth Street, Sydney.
- Annual Special Christmas Exhibition (group show), December 1986, Solander Gallery, 36 Grey Street, Deakin, ACT.
- Embroideries of Mirka Mora, 1978, Ballarat Fine Art Gallery, Ballarat, VIC
- Drawing exhibition (group show with John Perceval, Noel Counihan, Arthur Boyd), 24 February – 23 March 1977, Realities Gallery, Toorak, Melbourne, Vic.
- Project 20: Fabric Art, September 1977 – 9 October 1977, Art Gallery of New South Wales, Sydney, NSW
- Mirka Mora, Erotic Drawings and Figures 2–18 May 1974, Realities Gallery, Melbourne, Vic
- Mirka Mora: Paintings: 'The Finding of Erichthonius' June 1968 – 22 June 1968, Watters Gallery, Sydney, NSW
- Drawings by Mirka Mora. November 1968, Australian Sculpture Gallery, 1 Finniss Crescent, Narrabundah, NSW.
- Paintings by the Aleph Group (group show by Australian Jewish artists), 4–11 October 1964, Studio Nundah, Canberra.
- Foyer exhibition with Charles Blackman and Arthur Boyd, 26 March 1954 at the opening of "The Bachelor", Arrow Theatre
- Contemporary Art Society exhibition, opened 6 April 1954. Tye's Gallery. This was the first CAS exhibition since 1947 (the revival due to efforts by the Moras and Reeds) and Mirka Mora's first Australian show

== Publications ==
- Harding, Lesley; Morgan, Kendrah (2018), Mirka & Georges : A Culinary Affair, Miegunyah Press, ISBN 978-0-522-87220-0
- Mora, Mirka; Carter, Earl (2003), Love and clutter, Viking, ISBN 978-0-670-04064-3
- Mora, Mirka (2000), Wicked but virtuous : my life, Penguin, ISBN 978-0-670-88039-3
- Mora, Mirka; Delany, Max; White, Murray (Murray F.); Museum of Modern Art at Heide (1999), Mirka Mora : where angels fear to tread : 50 years of art 1948–1998, Museum of Modern Art at Heide, ISBN 978-0-947104-53-5
- Zavod, Christine; Mora, Mirka (1996), From angels with love, Lothian, ISBN 978-0-85091-793-2
- Mora, Mirka (1987), Mirka Mora : works 1957–1987, William Mora Galleries
- Beier, Ulli; Cox, Paul, 1940–2016 (1980), Mirka, Macmillan, ISBN 978-0-333-29932-6
- Mora, Mirka; Cantrill, Corinne; Cantrill, Arthur (1970), Mirka's colouring book number one (First ed.), Courtin/Fevola Publishing

== Motion pictures and audio ==
- Mirka Mora at the Australian National Film and Sound Archive
- Mora, Mirka; De Berg, Hazel (1965), Mirka Mora interviewed by Hazel de Berg in the Hazel de Berg collection
- Cox, Paul; Prahran College of Advanced Education (1970), Mirka, Prahran College of Advanced Education [production company], OCLC 220139646
- Mora, Mirka; Blackman, Barbara (1984), Mirka Mora interviewed by Barbara Blackman, 1984
- Jager, Claire; Lewis, John; Australian Film Commission; Omar Kayham Films (1996), The good looker
- Mora, Mirka; Kestrel Films (Australia) (1989), Australian Alps: Mirka's palace of dreams, Richmond, Vic: Kestrel Films, OCLC 754993822
- Mora, Mirka; Palmer, Sheridan (2012), Mirka Mora interviewed by Sheridan Palmer in the Australian art from 1950 to the present oral history project

== Collections ==
- National Gallery of Victoria, Melbourne
- National Gallery of Australia, Canberra
- Ballarat Fine Art Gallery
- Heide Museum of Modern Art, Melbourne
- Ararat Regional Gallery
- Myer Collection
- Peter MacCallum Cancer Institute, Melbourne
- National Australia Bank, Melbourne
- Council for Adult Education, Melbourne
- Federation Tapestry, Melbourne Museum
- St Kilda Pier Entrance Pavilion
- National Theatre Trust, Sydney
- Cosmos Bookshop, Melbourne
- Flinders Street Station, Melbourne
- Adelaide Festival Centre
- Perth Festival
- Ayr Community Library, Queensland
- Burdekin Library and Theatre, Sydney
- Tolarno Restaurant, Melbourne
- Malthouse Theatres Southbank Phantom Figures Panel Collection (one of 24)
- Numerous private collections in Australia and overseas

== See also ==
- Art of Australia
- List of Australian artists
