= Cynthia Reed Nolan =

Australian writer and art dealer (1908–1976)

Violet Cynthia Reed Nolan (1908–1976) was an Australian writer and gallerist who promoted modern art and design in Australia during the early to mid 1930s. She was a key member of the Heide Circle around Sunday and John Reed. Later she was based in London, but travelled widely. Although she and sister in law Sunday Reed had a bitter split after Cynthia Reed and Sidney Nolan married in 1948, John Reed described her on her death in 1976 as “Sunday's best friend” In the later 20th century, Reed Nolan was mostly remembered as the cause of the high-profile public feud between her husband and Australian author Patrick White.

== Early life ==
Born into a wealthy, landed family at Mount Pleasant, outside of Launceston, Tasmania, Cynthia Reed's childhood and adolescence was materially secure, but she found the evangelical Christianity and patriarchal sternness of her family life highly disturbing. Themes of childhood alienation are threaded through her fiction, informed by her experience of psychoanalysis and reading of Freudian theory and textbooks. After some years as a boarder at the Hermitage Girls' School, Geelong she lived with her sister Dr Margaret Reed in Melbourne. An affair with orchestral conductor Bernard Heinze during the late 1920s expanded her cultural and intellectual milieu, and she moved in a group of avant garde artists and patrons in Melbourne centred around her brother John Reed. Both Cynthia and Sunday Reed had affairs with Heinze in the late 1920s that broke up unhappily and Reed Nolan entered her first session of psychoanalysis.

Reed Nolan travelled overseas in 1929, seeking out contemporary theatre, art, design and music in London and then moved to Europe, staying with well-off families in Germany and Austria, including in Konigsberg East Prussia, Berlin and Vienna. Because she moved among Jewish intellectuals, she discussed the Weimar Republic's rising Antisemitism in letters home to Australia.

Returning to Australia by 1931, she spent time in Sydney with Mark Anthony Bracegirdle and his family, who introduced Reed Nolan to radical politics. She, in turn, influenced John Reed's uptake of communist ideas at this date. However Melbourne, where she was treated as a celebrity in the social pages of the local newspapers, became the site of her greatest success. She was the only bridesmaid at John and Sunday's wedding in January 1932 and the three lived together for some time in South Yarra, before John and Sunday moved to Heide, establishing the repeated pattern of the married couple needing close emotional investment with a third party to form a triangulated family unit. Amongst the Heide circle, Reed Nolan's first hand experience of international contemporary art and design stood out and enriched those who had not left Australia. Although later estranged, Sunday and Cynthia Reed shared many tastes and habits in common and constantly exchanged letters and gifts such as clothing or seeds and plants for the Heide garden.

== Business ==
In late 1932, Reed Nolan began mounting exhibitions in the furniture shop established by Frederick Ward, who had shared a house with her brother John in the 1920s. Artists ranging from Thea Proctor to Ian Fairweather were presented at her gallery. The display of Sam Atyeo's disqualified entrant in the 1932 National Gallery of Victoria Travelling Scholarship in the front window of Reed Nolan's Collins Street shop attracted much attention protested the official censorship of artistic innovation by Australian art museums and government art schools and established Reed Nolan as a leading modernist advocate. She later moved from Ward's former premises to an address in Little Collins Street Her business offered modernist interior design services to clients, with furniture by Ward and Atyeo, fabrics by Michael O'Connell and wallpapers imported from Germany. Reed Nolan herself designed at least one piece of furniture. Another high-profile opportunity was providing the furniture and accessories for Alleyne Clarice Zander's 1933 exhibition of British Modern Art in the Herald Building. Young Melbourne artists including Moya Dyring were employed to paint contemporary murals on commissions organised by Reed Nolan. Her business was one of the most high-profiled conduits for promoting modern art and design in 1930s Australia and brought her in contact with many art patrons including Maie Casey and Mary Alice Evatt, who became longstanding friends.

== Film and nursing career ==
By 1935, she had left the gallery and moved to Sydney, where she adopted the pseudonym, Miss Liesl Fels, and studied contemporary European style dance. At the same time she took an unsuccessful screen test with Ken G. Hall's Cinesound Studio, having sought auditions in London in 1929, and apparently was cast in a large scale Pat Hanna production in Melbourne, that began filming, but was left uncompleted when Hanna left Frank W, Thring's company. In 1936 she left Sydney by passenger ship in the company of a visiting American theatre producer, whom she named in letters to John and Sunday Reed as Michael, without identifying him further The couple separated in Hollywood, where Reed Nolan stayed for six months, again seeking to break into film acting. At this time she underwent a number of medical procedures, including aesthetic dentistry and a double mastectomy. However she also abandoned her desire to become a film star, in order to enroll in nursing training in Chicago, but was forced to leave within six months due to United States immigration law and she continued her training at St Thomas' Hospital London. She remained in contact with Australian expatriates including Clarice Zander and Sam Atyeo. At the outbreak of World War Two, she was working at the American Hospital in Paris and moved to New York, where she studied psychiatric nursing at the Payne Whitney Psychiatric Clinic, but returned to Melbourne when she discovered that she was pregnant. Sunday Reed wished to adopt the child, prompting Reed Nolan's return to Sydney with her infant daughter in 1941 where she established a home in then rural Wahroonga.

== Marriage to Sidney Nolan and later career ==
During the 1940s, Reed Nolan concentrated on writing novels, producing two autobiographical novels, Lucky Alphonse, 1944 and Daddy Sowed A Wind! 1947 in a highly modernist style, unlike the social realism that was the norm in Australian literary fiction. The first was mildly well received. In March 1948 she married artist Sydney Nolan, who had left the Reed household at Heide, after a brief 3 month courtship. Almost immediately Reed Nolan's network of contacts within both art circles and high society in New South Wales established Sydney Nolan as a prominent and successful artist and his reputation grew rapidly, even more than under John and Sunday Reed's promotion. Reed Nolan's previous talent as a gallerist was now devoted to Nolan alone. Of their marriage M.E.McGuire wrote "They were constant companions, their lives and works so intertwined as to be interchangeable", and Underhill wrote "[Sidney Nolan] achieved a settled home life. Cynthia gained a partner and a cause. Above all, they considered each other intellectual equals, respecting and supporting their individual work habits."

In 1952, the Nolans left Australia, and rented accommodation in Britain, interspersed with extended international travel, until they bought a home in Putney, London in 1960. Reed Nolan authored a number of travel books based upon the lengthy journeys undertaken by her husband to various countries, often displaying early awareness of Postcolonial themes and illustrated by her husband. Reed Nolan undertook much of the work of promoting and organising her husband's exhibitions. Throughout the 1950s and 1960s, Reed Nolan knew many of the most significant creative talents in Britain, counting figures such as Kenneth Clark and Benjamin Britten among her acquaintances. During two years in the United States 1958–9, when her husband was awarded a Harkness Fellowship, Reed Nolan was diagnosed with tuberculosis, which was successfully cured in New York. Much of her previous poor health could be accounted by this long term undiagnosed illness. However the later 1960s and 1970s were marked by tensions in her marriage whilst her psychiatric health grew increasingly fragile. Nevertheless, she made meticulous preparations for the organisation and disposal of her estate, which included papers and artworks, before taking an intentional overdose of sleeping pills in a London hotel on 24 November 1976.

== Later impact ==
Reed Nolan was increasingly forgotten until Patrick White's autobiography Flaws in the Glass, which presented an extended description of her character and achievements and equally a savage attack upon both her husband and the jealousies and hostilities directed towards her by mediocre Australian contemporaries. This passage, which provided the first high-profiled documentation that she had taken her own life, prompted a massive public feud between White and Nolan. In 1994 an anthology of her travel writings, Outback and Beyond, with some excisions of her more unconventional and political content was published. Two scholars collected first hand accounts from surviving relatives, friends and colleagues in the 1990s, presented in a PhD in 2002 by Grant, and a biography in 2016 by McGuire. Nancy Underhill in her biography of Sidney Nolan established the case for Reed Nolan's importance as a foundation of the Heide mythology, and the manager of her husband's career.

== Bibliography ==
- Underhill, Nancy (2015). Sidney Nolan: a life. Sydney, N.S.W.: NewSouth Publishing. ISBN 9781921410888. OCLC 891680297.
- McGuire, Margaret E. (2016). Cynthia Nolan: a biography. Melbourne, Vic.: Melbourne Books. ISBN 9781922129963. OCLC 953826583.
- Grant, Jane (2002). Life and Work of Cynthia Reed Nolan (PhD thesis). Sydney, N.S.W.: The University of Sydney.
