= Alfred Tipper =

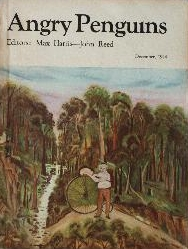
Tipper's art reproduced on the cover of Angry Penguins, 1944

Alfred Henry Tipper (12 July 1867 – 2 April 1944), also known by the pseudonyms Professor Tipper and H.D. (reported to be an initialism for Henry Dearing or Harold Deering), was an Australian showman, competitive and endurance cyclist, and outsider artist. His combined interests in mechanics, fitness and entertainment led to a long career as a trick cyclist and builder of miniature bicycles. Following his death, Tipper's artistic abilities were recognised by the Australian painter Albert Tucker, who promoted Tipper's paintings in the modernist art and literary magazine Angry Penguins.

== Life ==
Tipper was born on 12 July 1867 in the regional Victorian city of Sale to Thomas Tipper and his Irish-born wife Catherine. When he was two years old, Tipper was abandoned by his parents and raised as a ward of the state. In 1874, the Maitland Mercury reported Tipper as living in the harbourside Sydney suburb of Woolloomooloo; the young boy received attention in the press after discovering the body of a dead infant in a Belmore park. Later, he found employment at a dairy farm and developed considerable knowledge of mechanics, and in the 1880s took to the new sport of competitive cycling.

In 1896, Tipper rode on a penny-farthing from Sydney to Melbourne (roughly 900 km), carrying with him a 32 kg swag. This inspired him to ride around the world, and over the next six years Tipper took his "singing and comedy cycling act" to crowds across Britain and the United States. One routine involved him riding a custom-built 13 cm-high bicycle while singing the folk song "From the Highlands and the Lowlands". By the 1930s, Tipper was part-owner of a bicycle repair shop in Richmond, Melbourne, and toured Australia regularly with his large collection of bikes. Known by his nickname "Professor Tipper", he sported a long white beard and advocated for a "rational" dress sense of thin shirts and knickerbockers. He also attempted to build a pedal-powered aeroplane. Tipper lived his final years in squalor on a vacant allotment opposite Brunswick Town Hall, where he erected a makeshift shelter from the body of an old motorcar. Despite these hardships, his passion for cycling and "unique capacity for self-advertising" remained undimmed. He died on 2 April 1944 at Royal Melbourne Hospital and was buried in Fawkner Cemetery.

== Art ==
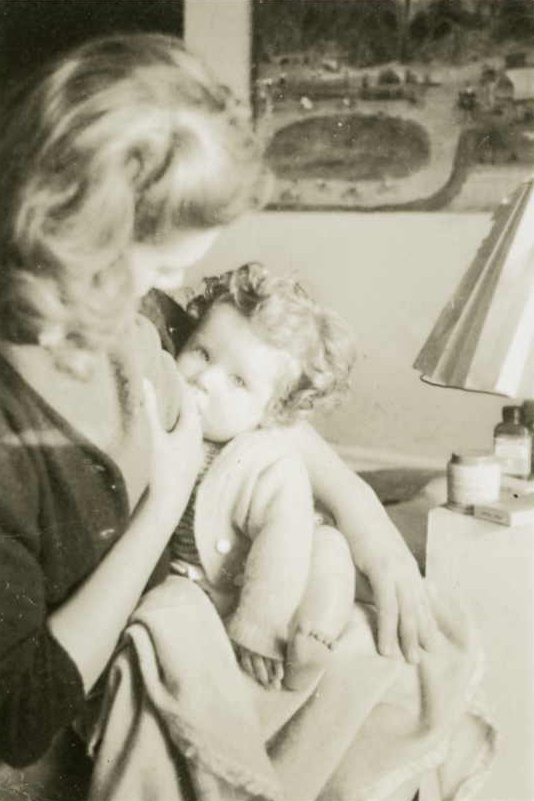
Photograph by Tucker of Joy Hester nursing their son Sweeney. A Tipper painting can be seen in the background.

Tipper produced several postcards and oil paintings documenting his cycling achievements. After he died, five of his paintings were salvaged and displayed in the window of a bicycle shop on Swanston Street. They were spotted by the young Melbourne modernist painter Albert Tucker, who greatly admired the works' naïve boldness, painterly qualities, and unique treatment of the Australian countryside. Tucker acquired one of the large unframed canvases (signed "H.D.") and pinned it up in his East Melbourne terrace house. In the December 1944 issue of Angry Penguins, Tucker wrote that H.D.'s paintings bore "the unmistakable mark of the natural artist ... a startling sense of life expressed through an unfaltering sense of form, pattern, texture and colour, with the anecdotal eye of the traditional "primitive"". Tucker, a self-taught artist (like other Angry Penguins members such as Sidney Nolan and John Perceval), saw H.D. as an example of an artist who hadn't the "disadvantage of training in some socially endorsed art style".

Only after the publication of H.D.'s work in Angry Penguins and inclusion in group exhibitions run by the Contemporary Art Society was the artist's true identity discovered. Tipper's paintings are now held in major galleries including the National Gallery of Australia and Heide Museum of Modern Art, and his art formed part of the 2005 touring exhibition Raw and Compelling: Australian Naïve Art.

== See also ==
- Ern Malley
