= Mary Alice Evatt =

(1898–1973) Australian artist and political activist

Mary Alice Evatt (1898–1973) was an Australian artist, art patron, arts advocate and political activist. In 1943 she was the first woman to be appointed as a trustee of the Art Gallery of New South Wales. She was a noted advocate of contemporary art in Australia, and a student of André Lhote in Paris in 1938. Evatt did much to promote modernism in Australian public life in the 1930s to 1950s. With direct links to the centre of political power in mid 20th century Australia via her husband's legal and political career, she enjoyed unique public agency for an Australian woman artist in the mid 20th century and much of her career unfolded in the public spotlight.

== Early life and early political activities ==
Evatt was born in Iowa to Samuel Sheffer (d.1929), manufacturing chemist, and his wife Alice Maud, née Holt. As a child, her family moved to New Zealand, then Melbourne, and finally settled in Sydney where her family enjoyed a comfortable life due to her father's business success.

She enrolled in the architecture school at the University of Sydney but after meeting H.V. Evatt changed her course to legal studies to better engage with his interests. They married in 1919, against her father's wishes, as he regarded Evatt as from a lower social class and travelled overseas for their honeymoon. Evatt also wrote poetry at this date and throughout her life, which remained unpublished. Throughout the 1920s she supported her husband by vigorously campaigning amongst women voters and also organising relief for families affected by the great depression.

== Art career in the 1930s ==
Her husband's appointment as a judge of the Supreme Court of Australia in 1930 meant that the couple travelled frequently, allowing Evatt to spend time in classes at both of Australia's most radical art schools at that date, the Bell-Shore School in Melbourne and Crowley-Fizelle school in Sydney. A mature and diligent student, her art developed and consolidated rapidly and whilst her output was relatively small, her paintings easily match those of more prolific contemporaries. Her awareness of a broad range of modern art was unusual in an Australian context. In Melbourne she became close to the early Australian cubist Moya Dyring, and they remained friends throughout their lives. Evatt often visited Moya in Paris and the two women painted together in France. Art patrons John and Sunday Reed also were friends and through them Evatt and her high profiled husband became known in the Heide Circle. Through George Bell and John Reed both of the Evatts became active in the Contemporary Art Society. In 1938, Evatt studied with André Lhote in Paris and Hans Hofmann in New York.

== Art Gallery of New South Wales trustee ==
Appointed a trustee of the Art Gallery of New South Wales (AGNSW) in 1943, she often voted against the conservative stance of the other trustees, including during the controversy about William Dobell's portrait of Joshua Smith. She was an ally and a supporter of the young Bernard Smith who managed the wartime touring exhibitions of Australian art sent out from the AGNSW into rural NSW, an initiative that Evatt advocated. Notably she was one of the strong women who facilitated and supported Smith's career. She held that post until 1970 and was the only female trustee during those years. Her public career and her political commitment made an early link between the Australian Labor Party and the art world, which would not be ratified until the election of the government of Gough Whitlam in 1972. Evatt's lobbying for Smith also enabled him to reach a highly influential position and established his career. Thus Mary Alice Evatt had a uniquely extended influence for a woman artist.

== Public life and World War II ==
Evatt's activities extended beyond Australia onto a global stage when her husband was deputy leader in the Curtin Labor Government, spending time in the United States, and more so when H.V. Evatt became the first president of the United Nations General Assembly in 1946–1948. The couple had a home in Paris and spent much time in that city. She met Pablo Picasso in Paris and invited him to attend the UN assembly. Other significant figures whom she knew included F.D. and Eleanor Roosevelt, Charles de Gaulle, Winston Churchill. She bought Australian art on behalf of Queen Elizabeth II. After World War II in Paris she worked with curatorial teams bringing public artworks out of wartime safe keeping.

In the 1950s, a conservative Australian government meant that the Evatts' political and cultural influence significantly diminished in Australia and globally. However Mary Alice had links to the conservative regime through her long friendship with Maie Casey, whom she saw, like Eleanor Roosevelt, as a like-minded colleague. H.V. Evatt's increasing ill-health also shaped her later years, limiting her time for public and cultural affairs, although she held some posts such as the Convenor of Art and Letters for the National Council of Women and presidencies of United Nations related bodied. Evatt judged a number of art shows. Some of her valuable art collection, including a Modigliani, were sold to fund H.V. Evatt's health care costs. Whilst settled in Canberra, she still found time to study with Desiderius Orban and later at the Canberra School of Art, where she specialised in sculpture. The latter medium became a focus in her later years.

== Exhibitions ==
In 2002–2005 a major touring exhibition of her work, curated by Dr Melissa Boyde, was organised by the Bathurst Regional Gallery, with support from the Evatt Foundation. It presented a collection of her modernist works and toured to venues including Heide Museum of Modern Art, Canberra Museum and Gallery and the S.H Ervin Gallery, Sydney. In 2018 Boyde curated 'Art for the People: Mary Alice Evatt' shown at the Blue Mountains Cultural Centre Gallery.

== Play ==
In 2018 Evatt featured in a play by Peta Tait, Eleanor and Mary Alice, focusing on her friendship with Eleanor Roosevelt and their influence on world affairs.
