= Laurence Collinson =

Australian writer

Laurence Henry Collinson (7 September 1925 – 10 November 1986) was a British-Australian playwright, actor, poet, journalist, artist, secondary school teacher and counsellor. He was also a gay man and an LGBTQI rights activist who, throughout his life, advocated for homosexual law reform,

== Biography ==
Collison was born in Leeds and, in 1930, when he was 2 years old the family immigrated to New Zealand, where they settled for a short time in Auckland before moving again to Australia. By around 1937 they had settled in Brisbane where Collison attended Brisbane State High School.

While at school Collinson, alongside fellow students Barrett Reid and Cecel Knopke, started the magazine Barjai: a meeting place for youth, which between 1943 and 1947. It contained a mixture of poetry and commentary and, after starting by being only about to publish duplicates by using carbon copies, they grew in sophistication and eventually published the literary avant-garde in Adelaide and Melbourne.

Charles Osborne, who also worked, on the magazine and noted that Collinson's contributions had a combative and melancholy style and recalled that, of this, Collison said `those born in a great Depression and growing up into a World War would not ever have much humour’. He viewed himself as an outsiders and he was Jewish, homosexual and communist.

In addition to the magazine Collinson and Reid also organised the Barjai group which met regularly with writers throughout the region including Clem Christesen.

In 1944, the year after Collinson had finished school, the magazine began to be commercially printed and where distributed throughout Australia. The same year Collison was also brought to national attention when his poem Myself and the New Year, 1944, which discussed wartime abortion, was a part of an indictment for indecency against Max Harris who had published it in Angry Penguins.

In addition to the magazine Collinson and Reid also organised the Barjai group which met regularly with writers throughout the region including Clem Christesen.

Collinson was also a painter and in 1944, after completing school, studied art at the Central Technical College in Brisbane and in 1945 at the Julian Ashton Art School in Sydney. In December 1945 he returned to Brisbane where he established the Miya Studio alongside other young artists which sought to break away from the conservative Royal Queensland Art Society. He was contemptuous of that society and said of it:

Queensland art today is practically sterile. Year after year the same pretty still-life's, the same pretty landscapes, the same pretty figure studies are disgorged in their hundreds... It would seem that the discoveries and re-discoveries in art over the past fifty years, the wars, the revolutions, the terrible events that have taken place in that time, have made little or no impression on our local painters: they are working with their eyes closed

— Laurence Collison, at the opening of the Younger Artists Group, 1945

The group which formed the Miya Studio cultivated a loosely expressionistic style, which was reflected in Collinson's own, and they formed close associations with notable artists Sidney Nolan and Charles Blackman.

Along with painting Collinson continue to write plays and, during this period, many of these were performed at the Brisbane New Theatre which was communist led and had strong links with the Miya Studio. These plays included Friday Night at the Schrammers (1948) and No Sugar for George (1949). In 1949 the Miya Studio was reconfigured, alongside the New Theatre, to become the New Theatre Club Artists Group.

Perhaps because of this merger in 1950 Collinson moved to Melbourne where, on 3 January 1955, he married Ray Green who worked as a stenographer and, at an unknown later date, they divorced. In 1955 he also received a secondary teaching diploma from Mercer House and from 1955 to 1961 taught mathematics and English in various Melbourne secondary schools until in 1956 he began working for the publications department of the Victorian Education Department. As a part of this role he was the editor of The Educational Magazine which was published by them.

In 1957 he published The Moods of Love, a book of poetry and in 1961 won an award for his play The Zelda Trio.

In 1964, he returned to England where he hoped to make his living as a writer and this was a prolific period for him and he produced a number of works including Who is Wheeling Grandma? (poetry book, 1967), The Lion Who Ran Away (children's book, 1967) and The Lion Who Ran Away (novel, 1973). Additionally, his play Thinking Straight (1975) was first performed at the Gay Sweatshop in February 1975, which he had been a founding member of, and it was subsequently picked up by Inter-Action. At Inter-Action it was selected as a part of their Homosexual Acts season, where it opened on 10 March 1975, at the Almost Free Theatre. Despite this success he still had to maintain paid work and was a sub-editor for a magazine publisher.

In the 1970s he worked in his West Hampstead apartment as a gestalt and transactional analysis therapist and developed a fascination with psychotherapy. He was also involved in the advocacy group Campaign for Homosexual Equality and, in August 1970, became the Chairman of the London Group.

Collinson died in London on 10 November 1986.

== Select credits ==
- Nude with Violin (1965)
- A Slice of Birthday Cake (1964)
- The Trapper

== Select publications ==
- The Moods of Love, Edwards & Shaw, 1957
- Who is wheeling Grandma?, Edwards & Shaw, 1967
- Cupid's Crescent, Grandma Press, 1973 (self-published)
- Hovering narcissus: poems, Overland, 1977
