= The Good Looker =

1995 documentary film

- Directed by: Claire Jager
- Written by: Claire Jager; Michael Jager
- Produced by: John Lewis
- Starring: Kerry Armstrong; Mitchell Faircloth; Leverne McDonnell; Paul Upchurch
- Music by: Paul Grabowsky
- Release date: 1995
- Running time: 58 minutes
- Country: Australia
- Language: English

The Good Looker is a 1995 documentary film, created by Claire Jager, about the life of Melbourne artist Joy Hester.

== Reception ==
In The Age Dennis Pryor says "This is a fascinating piece of work, a most courageous struggle with difficult material." Adrian Martin, also in The Age, gives it 3 stars calling it an "imaginative and compelling documentary portrait". Jane Freeman in the Sydney Morning Herald writes "This is an elegant and absorbing film, which interweaves acted vignettes with interviews with Tucker, Charles Blackman, Mirka Mora, Hester's sister and her friends."

== Awards ==
- 1995 Australian Film Institute Awards
  - Best Documentary - Claire Jager - won
  - Open Craft Award - Paul Grabowsky - won
