= Moya Dyring =

Australian artist (1909–1967)

- Born: 10 February 1909; Coburg, Australia
- Died: 4 January 1967 (aged 57); London, United Kingdom
- Known for: Painting
- Movement: Cubism
- Spouse: Sam Atyeo (married 1941–1948)

Portrait of Sunday Reed c. 1934

Moya Dyring (10 February 1909 – 4 January 1967) was an Australian artist. She was one of the first women artists to embrace Modernism and exhibit cubist paintings in Melbourne. For several years she was a member of the modern art community known as the Heide Circle, named after the home of art collectors John and Sunday Reed, and now the Heide Museum of Modern Art. Dyring then travelled to the USA and France, where she lived most her life. Her work is held in the Heide Museum as well as the National Gallery of Australia.

== Early childhood and education ==
Moya Clare Dyring was born in Coburg, Victoria in 1909, the third child of Carl Peter Wilhelm Dyring, medical practitioner, and his second wife Dagmar Alexandra Esther, née Cohn, both Victorian born. The family moved to Brighton, a suburb of Melbourne, in 1920. Moya was educated (1917–1927) at Firbank Church of England Girls' Grammar School, Brighton.

After visiting Paris in 1928, she studied at the National Gallery of Victoria Art School (NGV), Melbourne, from 1929 to 1932, where she met her future husband Sam Atyeo an artist who was a Parisian resident. After NGV, Moya studied under George Bell in the Bourke Street Studio School in Melbourne. Bell and Atyeo encouraged her to experiment with modernism. Sunday Reed also studied at Bell's school at the time.

== Career ==
For several months in 1937 Dyring took charge of Heide, the home and garden of the art patrons John and Sunday Reed, at Bulleen, a suburb of Melbourne. Dyring became part of the artist community that developed around Heide, the Heide Circle, and developed a strong friendship with Sunday Reed and with the artist Joy Hester. Dyring's husband, Sam Atyeo, had an affair with Sunday Reed and Dyring later had an affair with Sunday's husband John. Much of what is known about Dyring's life comes from her life-long correspondence with Sunday Reed.

Drying had a successful solo exhibition at Riddell Gallery in Melbourne in June 1937. John and Sydney Reed purchased a work from this exhibition.

In August 1937, Dyring embarked for Panama, then travelled to New York City. She disliked the work of contemporary American artists and sailed for France. In 1938, she was based in Paris, taking advantage of Atyeo's contacts within the avant-garde. She studied at the Académie Colarossi, the Académie de la Grande Chaumière and with André Lhote.

In 1939, she and Atyeo set up house on a farm in Vence, France. Atyeo later accepted a commission in Dominica, West Indies, and left Dyring in Vence. At the outbreak of war, she was evacuated back to Australia via South Africa, where she painted and tried to study tribal art.

From Australia, Dyring travelled to Dominica where she married Atyeo. Atyeo was offered work in the USA and Dyring followed him there. They were not happy and neither was painting. In 1946, Dyring returned alone to Paris and they divorced in 1950. In Paris, she set up an apartment where she welcomed Australians and befriended a number of visiting Australian artists. The apartment became known as Chez Moya.

In 1961, Dyring curated the Australian submission to the Paris Biennale. She returned to Australia five times (until 1963) and exhibited in several cities on each visit.

She remained in contact with the Reeds right up until her death from cancer in 1967, in Wimbledon, London. After her death, friends acquired a studio in the Cite International des arts in Paris, and the Art Gallery of New South Wales grants two-month tenancies to artists each year.

== Works ==
Dyring produced drawings, oil paintings and pastels.

One of her earliest works (cubist in style), Melanctha, 1934, was acquired by Sunday Reed. In 1934 Dyring also painted Portrait of Sunday Reed which went into the Reed's collection, along with a cubist style Portrait of a Woman from the same year.

While her early works were figurative or cubist, in France she turned to landscape as she travelled to various towns throughout France. In her later years, unable to travel freely, she painted children against the backdrop of Paris.

As time passed, she was largely glossed over and not included in major exhibitions of artists, especially women artists, of the 30s, 40, and 50s. In 2002, at the University of Melbourne, Gaynor Patricia Cuthbert delved into her life and work for a doctoral thesis, helping to bring back attention to her work.

== Collections ==
The Heide Museum of Modern Art holds many paintings and drawings, some acquired through the John and Sydney Reed collection.

The National Gallery of Australia, Canberra includes one drawing.

The Art Gallery of New South Wales holds multiple works.

The websites of these galleries include images of Dyring's works.

== Tribute ==
Dyring Place in the Canberra suburb of Chisholm is named in her honour.

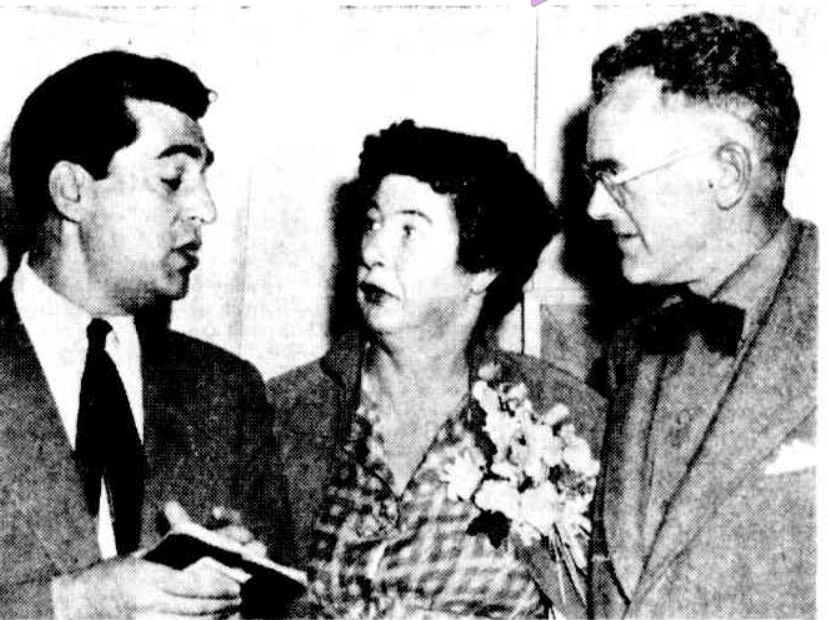
Moya Dyring with Claude Bonin-Pissarro (left), and the director of the National Art Gallery of Victoria, Hal Missingham, February 1953
