= Sam Atyeo =

Australian artist and diplomat (1910–1990)

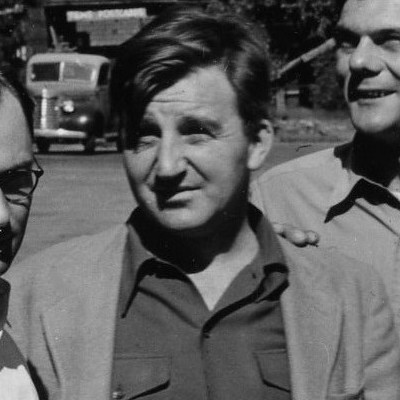
- Atyeo at Yosemite National Park in 1945
- Born: Samuel Lawrence Atyeo; January 6, 1910; Brunswick, Victoria, Australia
- Died: May 26, 1990 (aged 80); Vence, France
- Education: National Gallery of Victoria Art School
- Occupations: Artist; designer; diplomat
- Notable work: "Organised Line to Yellow"
- Movement: Modernism
- Spouses: Moya Dyring (married 1941–1948); Anne Lecoultre (married 1950–1990)

Samuel Laurence Atyeo (6 January 1910 – 26 May 1990) was an Australian painter, designer and diplomat. Atyeo was active in Melbourne's modernist movement in the 1930s and was associated with the Heide circle. He later had a diplomatic career working under Herbert Evatt, and was noted for his unconventional approach to the work. He gave up both artistic and diplomatic work in the 1950s and spent the rest of his life farming in France with occasional returns to painting. Atyeo's art and design work made a considerable contribution to modernism in Australia, and his painting "Organised Line to Yellow" is considered Australia's first abstract painting.

== Biography ==
=== Early life and artistic career ===
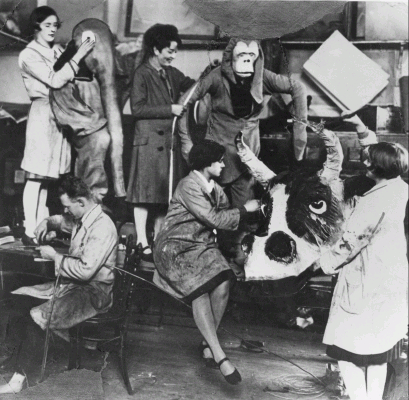
Sam Atyeo wearing a monkey costume at the National Gallery of Victoria Art School in 1930

Sam Atyeo was born in Brunswick, Melbourne in 1910. His parents were Alfred Vincent Atyeo, a chauffeur, and Olivia Beatrice Victoria (née Cohen). During his childhood, Atyeo suffered long periods of illness which allowed him time to practice drawing. He studied at the Working Men's College and the National Gallery of Victoria Art School, where he was tutored by William Beckwith McInnes and Lindsay Bernard Hall. While studying, Atyeo became romantically involved with fellow art student Moya Dyring.

In 1932, Atyeo attracted controversy for his submission for the NGV Art School's travelling scholarship. He was dismayed by the gallery director Hall's adherence to realism as well as his teaching style. Atyeo's submission, an abstract painting titled A Gentle Admonition, depicted a caricature of Hall with two nude female students. Hall was offended by the painting's style and perceived it as an attack on his teaching. Hall refused to display the painting in the scholarship exhibition, reasoning that the painting did not meet style regulations. The painting was then displayed at furniture designer Frederick Ward's shop on Collins Street.

Atyeo became a designer at Cynthia Reed's shop and would exhibit his paintings there. Reed organised Atyeo's first exhibition in 1933 and helped him gain commercial commissions. The two also had a romantic relationship that reportedly produced a daughter, Jinx, who was adopted by Sidney Nolan. Aside from painting, Atyeo was active in industrial design and architecture, including designing a cocktail bar for the Hotel Australia with Reed and Ward. His time with Cynthia Reed led him to meet and establish a life-long friendship with politician and art patron H. V. Evatt. Reed also introduced Atyeo to her brother and sister-in law, art patrons John and Sunday Reed. John Reed was impressed by Atyeo and encouraged him to become part of their circle. Atyeo had an affair with Sunday at the same time that John had an affair with Dyring. Despite this, Dyring and Atyeo stayed together.

=== "Organised Line to Yellow" ===
In 1933, Atyeo painted "Organised Line to Yellow" which is believed to be Australia's first abstract painting. The painting resembles the work of Paul Klee although Atyeo was not familiar with Klee at the time. He said he created the painting after listening to Bach's Double Violin Concerto at a time when he exploring the relationship between music and art. The painting was a breakthrough in Atyeo's work. After completing it, he wrote to the Reeds saying: "I have risked everything, have burnt every bridge. I have painted an abstract big picture. I think it nearly very good, it may be terribly good".

"Organised Line to Yellow" was first exhibited in 1934 at the Contemporary Art Group exhibition. The work greatly impressed John Reed who purchased it and hung it above the fireplace at Heide.

=== Time in Europe ===
In 1936, using money earned from redesigning a facade on Flinders Lane, Atyeo moved to Paris. In France, Atyeo spent time with fellow Melburnian Louise Hanson-Dyer and frequently attended her salon. Hanson-Dyer commissioned him to design covers for her music publishing press. He met refugees from the Spanish Civil War which influenced his socialist views and resulted in the production of Republican propaganda posters. Through the posters, Atyeo came into contact with Picasso, Robert Delaunay and Fernand Léger. In 1939, Atyeo moved with Dyring, who had also moved to Europe, to a farm in Vence. Following the German invasion of France, the couple moved to Barbados where they married in 1941.

=== Diplomatic career ===
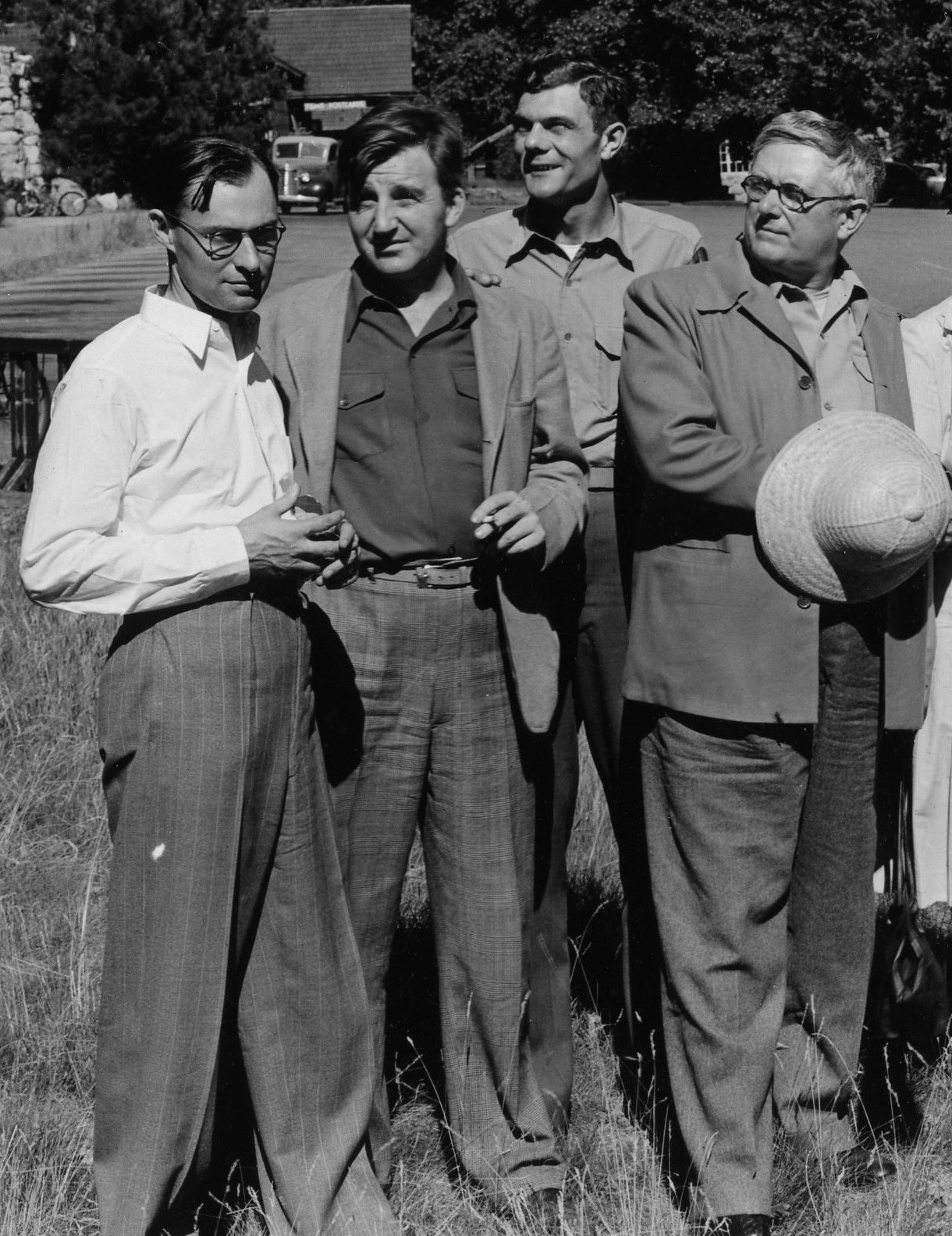
Sam Atyeo (second from left) with H. V. Evatt (far right) at Yosemite National Park in 1945

In 1942, Atyeo was hired by H. V. Evatt, who had become Minister for External Affairs. Although initially a temporary appointment, Atyeo worked for Evatt for eight years and was a trusted confidant who often accompanied him as an advisor. His diplomatic career started in New York as part of the office of the director-general of war supplies procurement. In 1945, Atyeo was stationed in Paris as the second secretary for the Australian legation and in 1947 assisted John Hood with UN special committees on the Balkans and Palestine. Atyeo notably opposed the partitioning of Palestine, reportedly saying Palestine should be given "back to the Turks with a substantial bonus to them for taking it". He became Australia's delegate on the Balkans committee in 1948. Atyeo's appointment and his qualifications for this position were publicly questioned by opposition politicians, including Eric Harrison, and the Commonwealth Public Service Clerical Association.

Atyeo's marriage to Dyring fell apart in 1948 and they divorced. Atyeo was dismissed from the diplomatic service in 1950 after his sponsor Evatt lost his position in government following the 1949 election. As a diplomat, Atyeo was known for his sense of humour, eccentricity and bluntness. Winston Churchill reportedly called Atyeo the world's most foul-mouthed diplomat. P.G. Edwards described Atyeo as having served "principally to entertain Evatt and boost his ego".

=== Later career and death ===
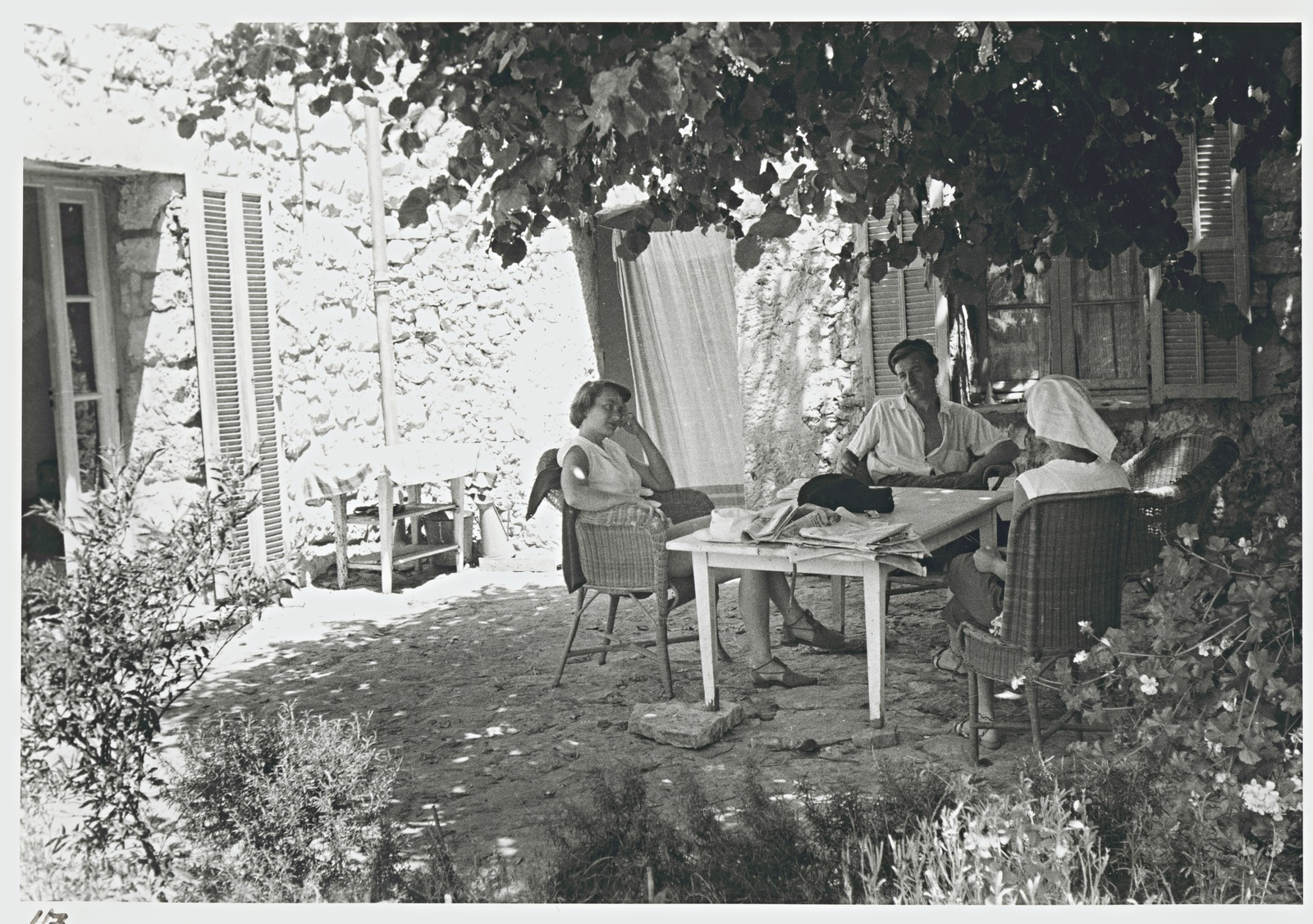
Sam Atyeo with Anne Lecoultre (left) at his farm in Vence, France

In 1950, Atyeo gave up painting and returned to his farm in Vence to grow grapes and roses, which he sold to the perfume industry. In November of that year, he married Anne Lecoultre. He started to paint again in 1960 but rarely exhibited his work. The Heide Museum of Modern Art held a retrospective of Atyeo's work in 1982.

He died in Vence on 26 May 1990.

== Art and design style ==
Atyeo's early paintings as a student followed the realism promoted by teachers at the NGV Art School. His paintings soon became more figurative and followed a post-Impressionistic style though he was usually classified as a modernist. He has been described as being "the most articulate proponent of modernism in Australia" during the early 1930s. While a student, he discovered the work of Paul Klee and was greatly influenced by it. His interest in European art movements set him apart from his contemporaries. He independently sought out information about overseas artists from imported books and journals from Melbourne bookshops and the Reed's collection. Other European artists that influenced Atyeo included Picasso, Cézanne and Van Gogh. He also displayed an intellectual engagement with artistic theory, often referencing Schopenhauer, Roger Fry, Clive Bell and Hegel.

He approached furniture design with an emphasis on the harmony of the colour, design and utility and placed a great importance on functionality.

Atyeo's later work was more lyrical and experimental in form and colour.
