= Atyeo =

Atyeo is a surname. Notable people with the surname include:

- John Atyeo (1932–1993), English footballer
- Sam Atyeo (1910–1990), Australian painter, designer and diplomat
