= Max Harris (poet) =

Australian writer Max Harris (1921–1995

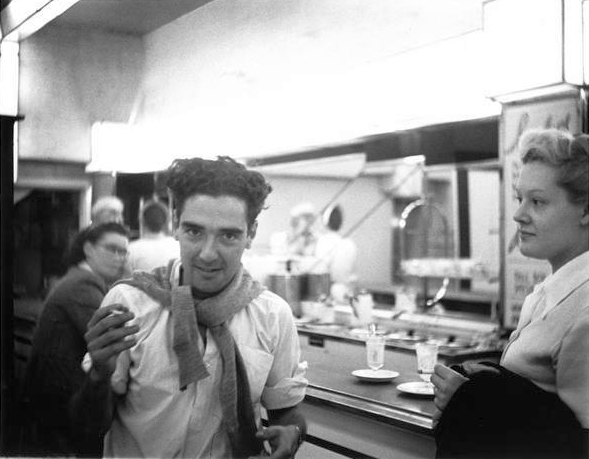
- Harris with Joy Hester, circa 1943, taken by Albert Tucker
- Born: Maxwell Henley Harris; 13 April 1921; Adelaide, South Australia, Australia
- Died: 13 January 1995 (aged 73)
- Occupations: Poet, critic, columnist, commentator, publisher, bookseller
- Spouse: Yvonne Harris
- Children: Samela Harris

Maxwell Henley Harris AO (13 April 1921 – 13 January 1995), generally known as Max Harris, was an Australian poet, critic, columnist, commentator, publisher, and bookseller.

== Early life and education ==
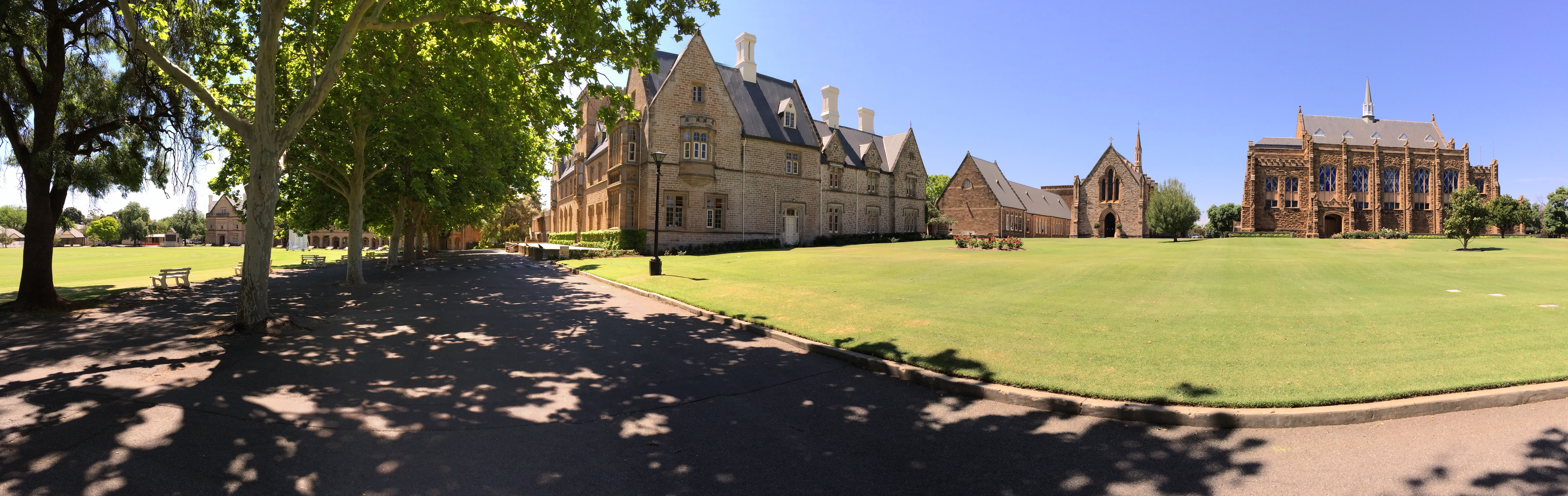
Panorama of St Peter's College campus, where Harris was educated

Maxwell Henley Harris was born on 13 April 1921 in Adelaide, South Australia, and raised in the city of Mount Gambier, where his father was based as a travelling salesman. His early poetry was published in the children's pages of The Sunday Mail.

He continued to write poetry through his secondary schooling after winning a scholarship to St Peter's College, Adelaide.

== Angry Penguins ==
Harris's passion for poetry and modernism were driving forces behind the creation in 1940 of a literary journal called Angry Penguins. His co-founders were D. B. "Sam" Kerr, Paul G. Pfeiffer and Geoffrey Dutton. The first issue attracted the interest of Melbourne lawyer and arts patron John Reed, who offered to collaborate on publishing further issues. Harris, already trying to establish a South Australian branch of the Contemporary Art Society, was lured to the Reeds' art enclave at Heide. By the second issue of Angry Penguins, Harris had incorporated visual art into the journal. Sidney Nolan later joined the editorial team. Other artists associated with Angry Penguins include Albert Tucker, Joy Hester, James Gleeson, Arthur Boyd, and John Perceval.

Traditionalist poets were outraged by the success of Angry Penguins, with its promotion of surrealism and publication of progressive writers such as Dylan Thomas, Gabriel García Márquez, James Dickey and the American poet Harry Roskolenko.

The poet and critic A. D. Hope was among those virulently opposed to Harris and the modernists. Hope inspired two young poets serving in the army, Harold Stewart and James McAuley, to "get Maxy". Under the name of "Ern Malley", the pair crafted a series of poems in the modernist style and submitted them to Harris at Angry Penguins. Harris thought the poems brilliant and published them with some fanfare in Angry Penguins.

The poems were controversial but well received. However, police in South Australia interpreted some lines in the poetry as lewd (one poem used the word "incestuous") and Harris was charged with obscenity.

Reed and Harris, who were by this time also publishing books, employed a detective to discover more about the mystery poet. Word emerged that Ern Malley was a hoax. The obscenity trial attracted international press attention. Harris was found guilty and fined five pounds despite noted literary critics testifying for the defence.

Harris never wavered in his belief in the quality of the Ern Malley poems, which continue to be published and studied.

== Later life and death ==
Harris ran the Mary Martin Bookshop in Adelaide with his university friend Mary Maydwell Martin. They published a monthly newsletter with literary criticism, comment and book reviews. After Mary Martin moved to India, Harris expanded the book chain across Australia and Hong Kong. The chain pioneered the remaindered book industry in Australia by offering quality titles at reasonable prices. Harris fought the stranglehold which overseas publishers had on the Australian book market, taking on major publishing houses to ensure accessibly-priced books for Australian readers. The Mary Martin chain was sold to Macmillan in the late 1970s.

Harris founded and co-edited the Australian Book Review and another literary journal, Australian Letters, which continued the practice of commissioning artists to illustrate poetry. He was also, together with Geoffrey Dutton and Brian Stonier, a founder of Sun Books. Harris published his poetry privately, although it was often included in classic Australian anthologies.

He became a long-serving and controversial columnist for The Australian, with many of his "Browsing" columns later published in book form. It was in this context that he was dubbed "Australia's Cultural Catalyst". He also wrote columns for Adelaide newspapers. Harris campaigned against censorship, and was an early voice in the Australian republican movement.

Although he was not a Catholic, Harris championed the then little-known nun and teacher, Mary MacKillop, founder of the Josephite order, calling her "a saint for all Australians". He became a prominent lay spokesman for her canonisation. Josephite nuns visited Harris in later life when he was ill. His ashes lie in a park between the Mary MacKillop College and the Josephite Convent in Adelaide.

He died on 13 January 1995.

A collection of his work was published posthumously by the National Library of Australia as The Angry Penguin.

== Recognition and honours ==
Harris was made an Officer of the Order of Australia in 1989.

In 1993 he was presented with the University of Adelaide Award.

== Personal life ==
Harris was the father of journalist and columnist Samela Harris.

A documentary film about Harris's relationship with his wife and about Adelaide's cultural life in the 1940s, Von Loves Her Modernist, was released by Rob George in 2022.

== Bibliography ==
=== Novels ===
- The Vegetative Eye, Reed & Harris, Melbourne (1943)

=== Poetry ===
- The Angry Penguin – Selected poems of Max Harris, National Library of Australia, Canberra (1996)
- A Window at Night, ABR Publications, Adelaide (1967)
- The Circus and Other Poems, Australian Letters, Adelaide (1961) – illustrated by Arthur Boyd
- The Coorong and Other Poems, Mary Martin Bookshop, Adelaide (1955)
- Dramas From the Sky, The Adelaide University Arts Association, Adelaide (1942)
- The Gift of Blood: Poetry, Jindyworobak Club, Adelaide (1940)
- Poetic Gems, Mary Martin Bookshop, Adelaide (1979)

=== Non-fiction ===
- The Australian Way with Words, Heinemann, Melbourne (1989)
- Kenneth Slessor, Lansdowne Press, Melbourne (1963)
- Laughter in the Air: Tales from the Qantas Era (1988) – with Colin Burgess
- The Land that Waited, Landsowne, Sydney (1971) – with Alison Forbes

=== Edited ===
- Australia's Censorship Crisis, Sun Books, Melbourne (1970) – with Geoffrey Dutton
- Australian Poetry, Angus & Robertson, Sydney (1967)
- Sir Henry, Bjelke, Don Baby and Friends, Sun Books, Melbourne (1971) – with Geoffrey Dutton
- The Vital Decade: Ten Years of Australian Art and Letters, Sun Books, Melbourne (1968) – with Geoffrey Dutton

=== Collected writings ===
- The Angry Eye, Pergamon Press, Sydney (1973)
- The Best of Max Harris – 21 Years of Browsing, Unwin Paperbacks, Sydney (1986)
- Ockers : essays on the bad old new Australia, Maximus Books, Adelaide (1974)
- The Unknown Great Australian and Other Psychobiographical Portraits, Sun Books, Melbourne (1983)
