= Samela Harris =

Australian journalist

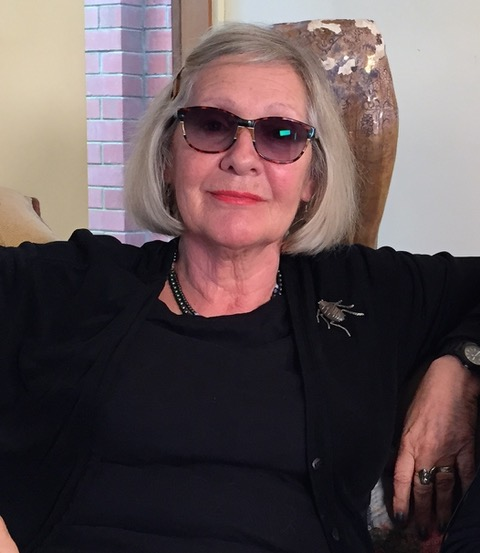
- Harris in 2021
- Born: 13 May 1946 (age 80); Adelaide, South Australia
- Occupations: Journalist, critic

Samela Scott Harris (born 13 May 1946) is an Australian journalist, critic, columnist, author, and blogger. Her nearly fifty year career as an arts journalist and cultural commentator spans a variety of print media. In 2017, for these and other contributions to South Australian cultural and public life, she was awarded the SA Media Lifetime Achievement award and inducted into the SA Journalists’ Hall of Fame.

== Early life and education ==
Samela Harris was born on 13 May 1946 in Adelaide, to the Australian poet and bookseller Max Harris, and Yvonne Harris, an actor and dancer. Following her graduation from the Presbyterian Girls' College in 1963, she enrolled at the Adelaide University Law School before successfully standing for the position of editor the university's student newspaper On Dit, which soon led to the offer and acceptance of a Murdoch scholarship in 1964, and shortly thereafter to her debut as a professional journalist as the first female general news reporter on Rupert Murdoch's, The News of Adelaide.

== Career ==
In 1969, Harris left Australia to work as a UK correspondent for AAP Reuters on Fleet Street, before gaining a job as a general reporter for the Edinburgh Evening News in Scotland, then as UK correspondent for Australia’s national paper, The Australian. Upon her return to Adelaide in 1985, she commenced what would ultimately be a twenty-eight year tenureship at The Advertiser, where her wide-ranging brief included literary reviews, the burgeoning internet culture of the mid 90s, and cookery: highlights from her cooking column "On A Shoestring" were eventually compiled and published in 2009 by Wakefield Press as a book of the same title. The principle focus of Samela's work at The Advertiser was the Adelaide performing arts scene, and in particular its theatre culture; she served as arts editor, and as a principle theatre critic and commentator throughout her tenure She was elected by her fellow critics to the inaugural chair of the Adelaide Critics Circle in 1997.

Her retirement from The Advertiser in 2013 preceded her increased participation in the civic life of Adelaide, as MEAA SA President of Journalists (since 2012), Convenor of Women in Media SA, and Chair of the SA Media Awards. She has continued her work as a critic and advocate as a regular contributor to the Barefoot Review, and Adelaide independent periodical InDaily. She maintains the blogs angrypenguin, satrekblog and ernmalley, a repository of documents related to the Ern Malley poetry hoax that notoriously targeted her father Max in the mid-1940s.
