= Shelton Lea =

Australian poet

- Born: 25 August 1946; Fitzroy, Australia
- Died: 13 May 2005
- Occupations: Poet, bookseller

Shelton Lea (25 August 1946 – 13 May 2005) was an Australian poet active in the Melbourne performance poetry scene.

== Biography ==
Shelton Giles Kimball Lea was born in 1946 in Fitzroy, as Philip Anthony Roberts and was soon after given up by his biological mother. He was adopted at the age of 13 months, along with another brother and sister, into the famous Darrell Lea family in Toorak. At the hands of his adoptive mother, Lea suffered and ran away from home at the age of 12. After a series of criminal charges in his youth (including being homeless which was a crime under the Vagrancy Act) led to stints in boys homes, he finally entered juvenile detention at Turana, where he first started to write poetry in exchange for tobacco.

His first poem began with a rhyming couplet that was not his own - (forewarned by legends of my youth/I trust not an associate's truth) and then he completed the poem with his own words which later appeared in Poems from a Peach Melba Hat. He regularly performed this first poem because, like much of his work, it was autobiographical. While in Turana, he also discovered the writing of Ezra Pound, which he claimed determined the course of his life.

Lea entered Pentridge Prison at 17, which he described as the nihilism of Kafka and the horror of Dante. He was released two months into a three-month sentence but he never really recovered. He was also incarcerated in Long Bay and the Goulburn Prison for minor offences. He did not return to prison after he turned 21. After his release, he went on to publish many collections of his work, as well as establishing Eaglemont Press and publishing the poetry of others. He also opened a number of bookshops, specialising in rare books. He was closely associated with the "Heide" Collective and mentored over thirty years by his close friend, the poet and librarian, Barrett Reid.

His final collection of poetry was Nebuchadnezzar, published by "Black Pepper Publishing" shortly before his death in 2005.

Lea's poetry has been widely anthologised.

== Death ==
On 13 May 2005, Lea died of lung cancer only days after the launch of his final collection.

At the time of his death a documentary on his poetry was being filmed by Robert Price and Taylor Coventry.

== Legacy ==
A biography of Lea, Delinquent Angel, was written by Diana Georgeff and published by Random House in 2007.

The Nebuchadnezzar Poems are also available on a limited edition CD.

== Bibliography ==
- "The Asmodeus Poems" (1962)
- "Corners In Cans" (Still Earth Press, 1969)
- "Chrysalis", Limited Edition, Illustrated by Joel Elenberg (National Press, 1972)
- "The Paradise Poems" (Seahorse Publications, 1973)
- "Chockablock With Dawn" (UQP Makar Press Gargoyle Poets 13, 1975)
- "Palatine Madonna" (Outback Press, 1979)
- "Poems From A Peach Melba Hat" (Abalone Press, 1985)
- "The Love Poems" (Eaglemont Books, 1993)
- "Totems" (Eaglemont Books, 2003)
- "Nebuchadnezzar" (Black Pepper Publishing, 2005).
