= Sunday Reed =

Australian art patron (1905–1981)

- Portrait by Moya Dyring, c. 1934
- Born: Lelda Sunday Baillieu; 15 October 1905; Camberwell, Victoria, Australia
- Died: 15 December 1981 (aged 76); Heidelberg, Victoria, Australia
- Occupations: Art collector and patron
- Spouses: Leonard Quinn (m. 1926; div. 1931); John Reed (m. 1932; died 1981)
- Children: Sweeney Reed (adopted)

Sunday Reed (born Lelda Sunday Baillieu) (15 October 1905 – 15 December 1981) was an Australian patron of the arts. Along with her husband, John Reed, she established what is now the Heide Museum of Modern Art.

== Personal life ==
Reed was born on 15 October 1905 in Melbourne, Australia, to Arthur Sydney Baillieu and Ethel Mary Baillieu (née Ham). She was a member of Melbourne's Baillieu family and the niece of William Baillieu, one of Australia's richest men. She was the third of four children and was homeschooled by a governess until she was 15. Reed finished her education at St Catherine's School, Toorak.

In Melbourne, Reed met Leonard Quinn, an American living in England. They were married on 31 December 1926 at Sorrento, Victoria and traveled in France and England for two years. Reed was diagnosed with gonorrhoea in 1929. The disease and several operations including a hysterectomy left her unable to bear children and deaf in her right ear; after her diagnosis, Quinn deserted her in England. Through family influence and connections, she was able to obtain a divorce from him in June 1931. She met solicitor John Reed at a tennis party in 1930. They married on 13 January 1932 at St Paul's Cathedral, Melbourne. Their marriage was recorded with the state but not with the church.

In the 1930s, Reed studied art under George Bell in his Bourke Street Studio School in Melbourne. Her only remaining work is a landscape drawing, showing her skill with colour and form.

In 1934, the Reeds purchased a former dairy farm on the Yarra River at Heidelberg, Victoria, now Bulleen, which became known as "Heide". They were both interested in many forms of art, including jazz, poetry, and writers. The couple hosted a variety of artists, for whom Reed would cook. According to Andrew Stephens, talented artists at Heide "helped shape Australian art from the 1930s on". The Reeds lived on the property until their deaths in 1981, a short time after the property had become the Heide Museum of Modern Art.

Reed cultivated a selection of wild roses, along with many other flowers. In 2015, about 150 of the 250 bushes she planted remained. She was resourceful in obtaining cuttings and plants, having some imported from overseas. The Reeds also sought out nurseries specialising in old roses, and sourced plants from Alister Clark, who bred some of Australia's more popular roses.

The couple supported the Communist Party of Australia (CPA). John helped fund CPA candidates in federal elections.

The Reeds took over care of and eventually adopted Joy Hester's son Sweeney after Hester was diagnosed with Hodgkin's Lymphoma in 1947.

John Reed died of cancer on 5 December 1981. Sunday Reed died by suicide ten days later, on 15 December.

Reed was the aunt of Ted Baillieu, who in 2010 became Premier of Victoria.

== Heide Circle ==
A number of modernist artists came to live and work at Heide at various times during the 1930s, 40s and 50s; many of the most famous works of the period were painted there. These artists were known as the Heide Circle and included Sidney Nolan, husband-and-wife couple Sam Atyeo and Moya Dyring, Albert Tucker and Joy Hester (who married in 1941), John Perceval, and Laurence Hope, among others. Nolan painted all but one of his 1946–47 Ned Kelly series on the dining room table.

The Heide Circle is known for the intertwined personal and professional lives of the people involved. Atyeo had an affair with Sunday; Dyring had an affair with John. Art historian Janine Burke has suggested Nolan and Sunday Reed had a close collaborative relationship. According to Burke, Reed helped Nolan find his artistic voice and in the process developed from a studio assistant to painting sections of the works herself, in particular the red and white squares in The Trial.

Nolan left his Kelly paintings at Heide when he departed under emotionally charged circumstances in 1947. He had lived in a ménage à trois with the Reeds for several years. Nolan wanted Sunday to commit herself to him and after her refusal he married John Reed's sister Cynthia. Although he spoke to the Reeds only once again, his years there have been seen as a significant factor in all their lives. Nolan once told Reed to take what she wanted, but he subsequently demanded all his works back. Reed returned 284 of his other paintings and drawings, but she refused to give up the 25 remaining Kellys, partly because she saw the works as fundamental to the proposed Heide Museum of Modern Art. She gave them to the National Gallery of Australia in 1977, resolving the dispute.

In the 1950s, Heide was again the centre of a circle of younger artists and poets, including Charles Blackman, Robert Dickerson, Judith Wright, Barrett Reid, Charles Osborne, Laurence Hope and Nadine Amadio. Reed was the first person to buy Blackman's work extensively. In the 1960s, Sweeney Reed invited his circle of artist and poet friends to Heide; these included Les Kossatz, Allan Mitelman, Shelton Lea and Russell Deeble.

== In popular culture ==
According to David Rainey, the relationship between Sunday Reed and Sidney Nolan is the basis for Alex Miller's 2011 novel Autumn Laing.

Philippe Mora's 2013 film Absolutely Modern discusses modernism, the female muse, and sexuality in art; it is based on 1940s Heide.

Rainey's 2014 play The Ménage at Soria Moria is a fictitious performance piece exploring the relationship between the Reeds and Nolan, both during Heide's heyday in the 1940s and in the years after.

Anthony Weigh's 2023 play ‘Sunday’ explore the relationship between Nolan and Sunday Reed.

The Sunday Reeds, an Adelaide rock band active since 2015, are named after her.

== Namesakes ==
Nicole Kidman and Keith Urban's daughter Sunday Rose Kidman, born in 2008, is said to be named after Reed; Kidman's father, Antony Kidman, has said he suggested the name. Urban stated in a 2009 interview that she was named after the day of the week, not Reed.
