= Angry Penguins =

Art and literary magazine

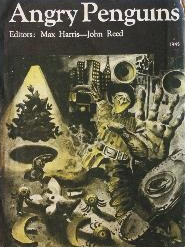
- Cover of the December 1945 issue of Angry Penguins, designed by Albert Tucker.
- Frequency: Annual
- Publisher: Adelaide University Arts Association (no. 1-2), The Hassell Press (no. 3), Reed & Harris (no. 4-9)
- First issue: 1940
- Final issue: 1946
- Country: Australia
- Language: English

Angry Penguins was an art and literary magazine established in 1940 by surrealist poet Max Harris. Originally based in Adelaide, the magazine moved to Melbourne in 1942 once Harris joined the Heide Circle, a group of modernist painters and writers who stayed at Heide, a property owned by art patrons John and Sunday Reed. Angry Penguins subsequently became associated with, and stimulated, an art movement now known by the same name. The Angry Penguins sought to introduce avant-garde ideas into Australian art and literature, and position Australia within a broader international modernism. Key figures of the movement include Sidney Nolan, Arthur Boyd, Joy Hester and Albert Tucker.

In 1944, Angry Penguins became the subject of a famous literary hoax perpetrated by anti-modernist poets James McAuley and Harold Stewart. The journal ceased publication two years later.

== Origins and ethos ==
The precursor to the Angry Penguins magazine, Phoenix, was published at the University of Adelaide with funds from the University Union. Funding was withdrawn in 1940 following a change in leadership. Phoenix was no longer published, but carried on as Angry Penguins under the Arts Association, with funding from J. I. M. Stewart and Charles Jury, and others.

Angry Penguins was first published in the South Australian capital of Adelaide. The title is derived from a phrase in Harris' poem "Mithridatum of Despair": "as drunks, the angry penguins of the night", and its use as a magazine title was suggested to Harris by C. R. Jury. In 1942, Harris gained the patronage of John and Sunday Reed in Melbourne, and the magazine subsequently moved to the couple's home at Heide (now the Heide Museum of Modern Art).

Through Angry Penguins, Harris and various contributors promoted modernism in Australian art and literature, challenging traditional and conservative cultural norms. They embraced experimental and innovative approaches in poetry, painting, and other forms of artistic expression. The Angry Penguins artists were early Australian exponents of surrealism and expressionism, and included John Perceval, Guy Gray Smith, Arthur Boyd, Sidney Nolan, Danila Vassilieff, Albert Tucker and Joy Hester.

The magazine attracted criticism from different factions of the Australian art and literary worlds. Its main Adelaide rivals were the nationalist and anti-modernist Jindyworobaks, whose poetry drew on Indigenous Australian culture and the Australian bush ballad tradition. According to Angry Penguins poet Geoffrey Dutton, "we stayed with Yeats, Eliot and Auden, ... and left Lawson and Paterson to the Jindys." The Communist Party of Australia and associated social realist painters also publicly criticised Angry Penguins. In the August 1944 issue of the Communist Review, to support his assertion that the magazine "has nothing to offer to Australian art, and that its effect will be to destroy, not raise Australian standards", Vic O'Connor wrote that editors of cultural publications are responsible for fostering cultural development as a part of the overall advancement of "standards of social and economic life in Australia", and that the editors of Angry Penguins are "completely indifferent" to this".

The final ninth issue was published in July 1946. A supplementary publication Angry Penguins Broadsheet was published until December 1946, lasting ten issues. The final issue of the Broadsheet edition was also the programme for the first Australian Jazz Convention.

== Ern Malley hoax ==
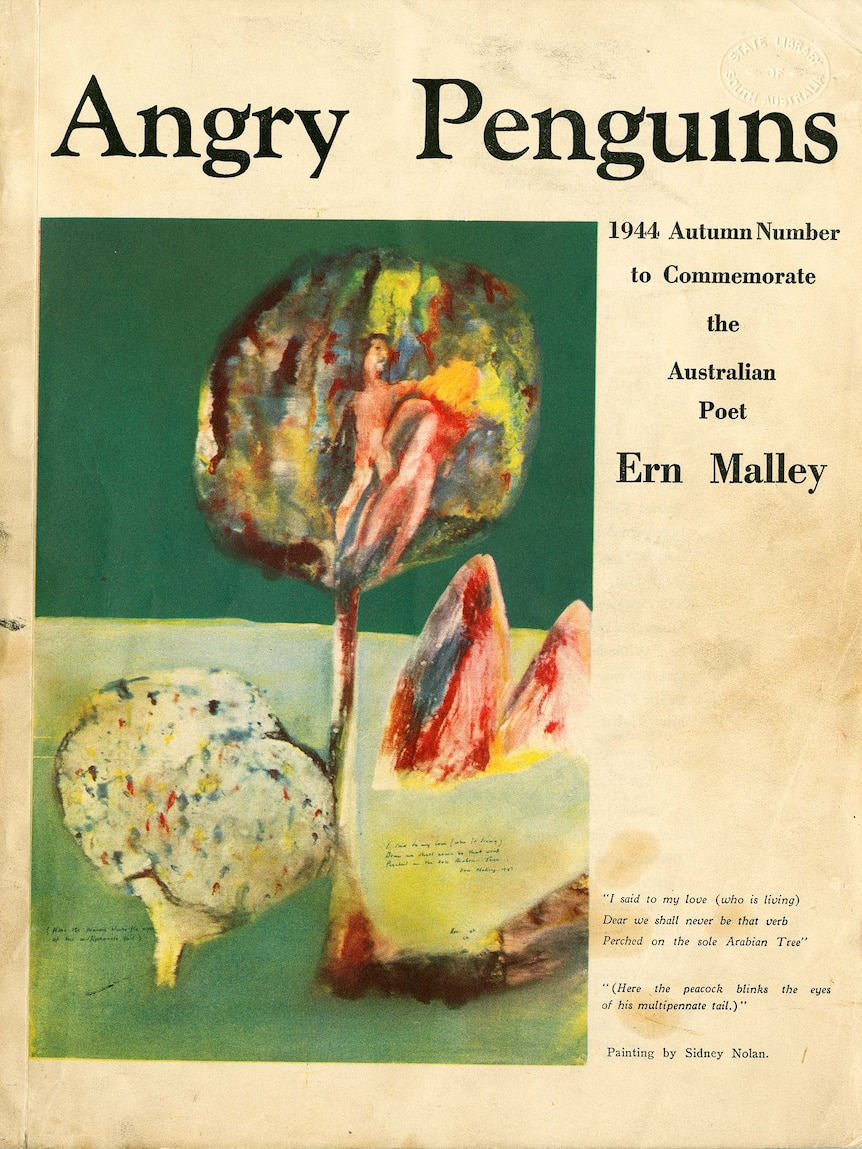
The Ern Malley edition of Angry Penguins. Featured on the cover is a Sidney Nolan painting inspired by lines from Malley's poem Petit Testament, which are printed on the cover, bottom right: "I said to my love (who is living) / Dear we shall never be that verb / Perched on the sole Arabian Tree / (Here the peacock blinks the eyes of his multipennate tail)".

Angry Penguins found detractors in poets James McAuley and Harold Stewart, who, during their time at the Directorate of Research and Civil Affairs, created a series of poems constructed as a pastiche of nonsensically arranged fragments, and attributed them to a fictitious poet named Ern Malley. McAuley and Stewart then submitted the poems to Angry Penguins for publication, and in doing so sought to prove that modernist poetry has no inherent value. The poems were received and published enthusiastically by the creators and patrons of Angry Penguins, who dedicated the 1944 autumn issue to Malley. When it was revealed to be a hoax, Angry Penguins received negative backlash, and the affair tarnished the image of the magazine, which was subsequently tried and convicted for indecency on the grounds that the poems contained obscene content.

== Legacy and influence ==
The Angry Penguins art movement was surveyed in the 1988 exhibition Angry Penguins and Realist Painting in Melbourne in the 1940s, held at the Hayward Gallery in London. In the exhibition's catalogue, English novelist C. P. Snow is quoted as saying that the Angry Penguins movement "was probably the last flowering of a 'national' modernism that a completely internationalised world of the arts was likely to see".

Broughton (2025) argues that Angry Penguins’ central claim, the supreme artistic value of creative expression, provided a vital platform for the Australian wartime avant-garde. Further, Broughton considers this central avant-garde concept of the role of the artist anticipated the development of an Australian postwar avant-garde, later called postmodernism.

== Restaurant ==
Angry Penguin is a restaurant at the Adelaide Festival Centre, opened in February 2026 as part of the venue's $55 million redevelopment. Located within the Festival Theatre's foyer, it replaced the centre's previous dining venue, The Star Kitchen and Bar. The restaurant draws its name from the Angry Penguins literary magazine founded by Max Harris. Harris's daughter Samela was consulted during the naming process. The kitchen is led by Executive Chef Alex Katsman, with a mid-century inspired interior designed by Studio Nine alongside South Australian furniture makers Andrew Carvolth and Jon Goulder. The restaurant is open for lunch and dinner and is operated by the Adelaide Festival Centre.

=== Cultural references ===
- My Life as a Fake is a 2003 novel by Peter Carey based on the Ern Malley hoax. It is a first-person narrative from the point of view of a young woman editing a literary magazine who encounters the perpetrator of the hoax (called Bob McCorkle, not Ern Malley, in the story) after many years. Carey is more interested in the idea of "magical thinking" than a literal recount; the Ern Malley character is a flesh-and-blood person who haunts his "creator."
- In Richard Flanagan's Booker Prize-winning novel The Narrow Road to the Deep North (2013), the main character, Dorrigo Evans, meets the love of his life at the launch of Angry Penguins.
- The 2021 Stephen Orr novel Sincerely, Ethel Malley follows Ern Malley's sister, Ethel, as she travels to Adelaide to help Max Harris prepare the special issue of Angry Penguins (released in autumn 1944) of her late brother's poems (The Darkening Ecliptic).

== See also ==
- Ern Malley
- Alfred Tipper
- Museum of Modern Art Australia
- John Reed
- Heidi Circle
- 1944 in Australian Literature
- Sokal affair
