= Albert Tucker (artist) =

Australian artist

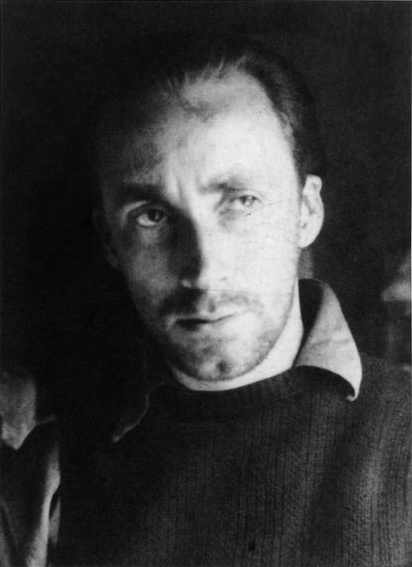
- Albert Tucker in 1940
- Born: Albert Lee Tucker; 29 December 1914; Melbourne, Australia
- Died: 23 October 1999 (aged 84); Melbourne, Australia
- Education: self taught
- Known for: Painting
- Movement: Expressionism, Heide Circle, Angry Penguins
- Patrons: John and Sunday Reed

Albert Lee Tucker (29 December 1914 – 23 October 1999) was an Australian artist and member of the Heide Circle, a group of modernist artists and writers associated with Heide, the Melbourne home of art patrons John and Sunday Reed. Along with Heide Circle members such as Sidney Nolan and Arthur Boyd, Tucker became associated with the Angry Penguins art movement, named after a publication founded by poet Max Harris and published by the Reeds.

== Early life and education ==
Tucker left school at 14 to help support his family and had no formal art training, but obtained work as a house painter, cartoonist and commercial illustrator, in an advertising agency before joining the commercial artist John Vickery. For seven years he attended the Victorian Artists' Society evening life drawing class three nights a week.

== Influences ==
Tucker's main inspirations include post-impressionists, expressionists and social realists, as well as personal experience. Tucker's work was strongly influenced by the realistic reflections of two important émigré artists, Josl Bergner and Danila Vassilieff, who arrived in Melbourne in the late 1930s about the same time that Tucker began to explore images of the Great Depression. Tucker also met Sunday and John Reed, members of the Contemporary Art Society, which was set up in 1938 by George Bell, in opposition to the government Australian Academy of Art, which was believed to promote conservative art and not the modernists.

Tucker's first significant works were produced during his involvement in the army. In 1940, Tucker was called up for army service and spent most of his time working in Heidelberg Military Hospital drawing patients suffering from wounds and mental illnesses as a result of war. He produced three important works at this stage, Man at Table, a pen and ink illustration of a man whose nose had been sliced off by a shell fragment, The Waste Land – the title drawn from T. S. Eliot's poem The Waste Land – an image of death sitting on a stool watching and waiting, and Floating Figures, of two figures floating down a hall, a third with a demented smile. All of these images illustrated the horror and madness of war, but in a style reflecting his social realists surrealistic and expressionistic style. The Futile City and We Are the Dead Men (both 1940) refer to Eliot's "The Hollow Men".

In 1942, Tucker was discharged from the war and returned to Melbourne. Tucker also took to photography, both of his own paintings, and to record the ideas and scenes he used to compose them, and inadvertently created a document of his time.

Starting in 1943, Tucker began his Images of Modern Evil series, first in Melbourne and later in Paris and London. The series was predicated upon what Tucker viewed as wartime moral vulgarity and centred around themes of prostitution, fear, moral corruption and the dark side of human personality. The Images of Modern Evil series was influenced by prostitution in Melbourne during World War II, which Tucker was repulsed by, and the Leonski murders as well his more general perception of a moral collapse. Artistically, the series was influenced by Giorgio de Chirico whose work appealed to Tucker and whom he met later in Rome in 1954.

== Angry Penguins ==
Tucker associated with John and Sunday Reed, who saw connections between Tucker's work and other artists, angry at the social situation. This so-called "Angry Decade" of the 1940s, saw artists Tucker become associated with the Angry Penguins, a group of modernist artists including Joy Hester, Sidney Nolan, John Perceval, Arthur Boyd and Noel Counihan. The Reeds' property at Heide was a major outlet for the expression of avant-garde ideas. The modernists and social realists shared the same concerns. These artists wrote for the publication Angry Penguins, published by Max Harris. Tucker's original influences, Bergner and Vassilieff, were part of this group.

== Post war ==
In early 1947, Tucker traveled to Japan with the Australian army as an art correspondent. He produced a monochrome pen drawing called Hiroshima; it contains no figures, just the aftermath of the atomic bomb blast, with tents and shelters littering the landscape. In 1954 he met Sidney Nolan in Rome, when he produced Apocalyptic Horse and began painting Australia from memory. He was exhibited in the Venice Biennale in 1956 and then spent two years in London painting the Thames Series.

He then moved to New York in 1958 and his subjects switched from the city to outback Australia. Where some works of Sidney Nolan and Russell Drysdale had reached international level, Tucker rejected them as being nationalistic. He depicted the landscape as being a harsh, barren and sterile wasteland. He distorted stereotypes and icons of the Australian bush, including convicts, Burke and Wills and the Kelly Gang. He was influenced by the sheer barrenness and hopelessness that the outback conveyed, and added these icons as pawns to the outback's deadly game.

In 1959, Tucker won the Australian Women's Weekly Prize, which enabled him to spend two years in New York producing the Manhattan Series and Antipodean Heads. In 1960 he was awarded the Kurt Geiger Award by Museum of Modern Art Australia which he used to return to Australia and mount his first Australian solo exhibition. He subsequently settled in Victoria and in 1964 he married his second wife Barbara Bilcock.

In 1990 the National Gallery of Australia held a retrospective of his work.

== Personal life ==
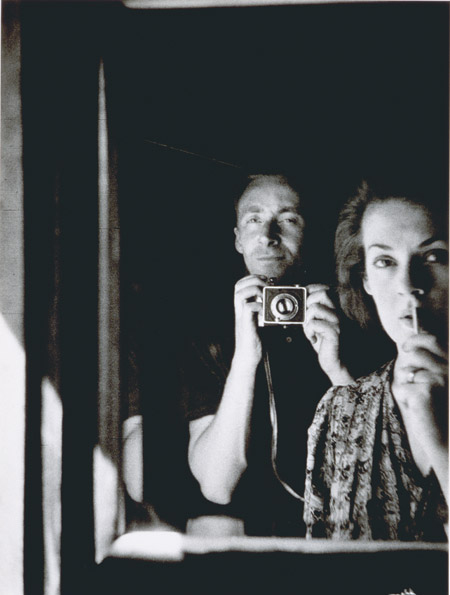
Albert Tucker and Joy Hester in 1939

In 1941, Tucker married fellow artist Joy Hester, and they had a son, Sweeney. It emerged many years later that Tucker was not the boy's biological father—it was probably Billy Hyde, an Australian jazz drummer with whom Hester had had a brief affair. His marriage broke down in 1947 and Tucker travelled to Japan and Europe, leading a bohemian life, painting, exhibiting and taking odd jobs. When Hester was later diagnosed with Hodgkin lymphoma, she gave Sweeney into the care of the Reeds, who adopted him. Joy Hester died in 1960, and Sweeney committed suicide in 1979.

In his later years in the 1980s, and especially after the deaths of John and Sunday Reed, Tucker took on the task of recording the history of the artists circle he had known:

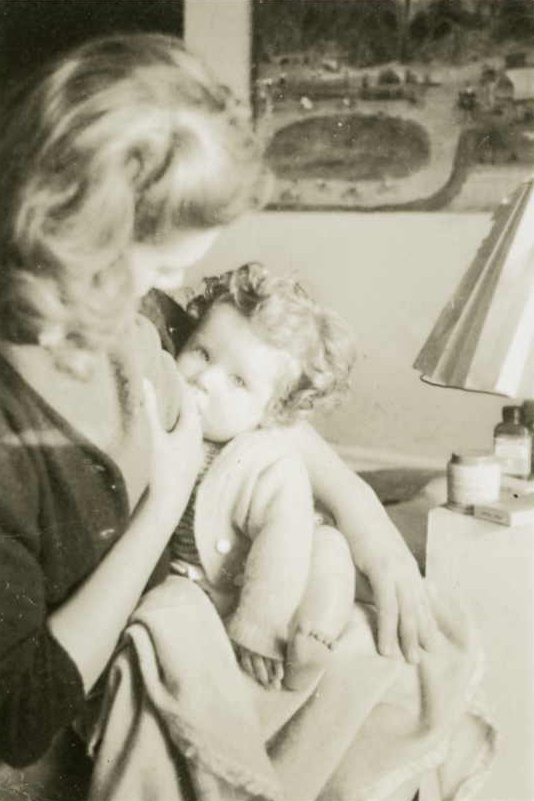
Hester nursing Sweeney, a photo taken by Tucker in 1945

...the thing I became aware of was that there was no human face for that period. So this is where the accidental historian came into play. Because when I thought of John and Sunday, Danila and Joy already gone, then the rest of us of course would follow in rotation. There’s no escaping that simple brute reality of existence, and so I developed this tremendous urge...to try and get what I could done in painting what I knew of them all.

The result was the series of portraits known as Faces I Have Met.

In each one I was trying to free myself as far as I could of any negative emotion or from the tensions and strains and relationships that had surged all around. One has to free oneself of malice or resentment. So in a sense it was also a spiritual exercise in self-purging and cleansing.

The title of this series is another reference to T. S. Eliot, his "Love Song of J. Alfred Prufrock".

Tucker's work is represented in all of the Australian State galleries as well as the National Gallery of Australia, the Guggenheim Museum and MoMA in New York.

Tucker married Barbara Bilcock in 1963. It was the second marriage for both. Tucker died in 1999. Barbara Tucker controls the Tucker estate.

== Bibliography ==
- Janine Burke, The Eye of the Beholder: Albert Tucker's Photographs, Heide Museum of Modern Art, Bulleen, 1998.
- Gavin Fry, Albert Tucker, Roseville, N.S.W. : Beagle Press, 2005. ISBN 0947349472
- David Hansen (May 2019). "'This Broken Jaw': T. S. Eliot, Ern Malley and Australian Modern Art". Australian Humanities Review (64).
