= Clarice Zander =

Australian art curator (1893–1958)

Alleyne Clarice Zander (9 February 1893 – 12 October 1958), was an Australian artist, art curator, gallery manager and publicist, born Alleyne Clarice Peel in Coleraine, Victoria.

She became known in Australia for organizing the British Contemporary Art exhibitions in Melbourne in 1932 and 1933 after moving to London in 1930 where she was appointed gallery manager of The Redfern Gallery. In 1934 she began working for the Royal Academy of Art, later becoming a full time employee. Zander was pivotal in reorienting the then conservative academy toward wider public engagement, being responsible for exhibition organisation and public engagement, becoming 'the public face of the academy'. For the New Burlington Galleries she helped organise and promoted exhibitions by Picasso, Salvador Dalí and Giorgio de Chirico and travelled to Nazi Germany to research works for Twentieth Century German Art made in response to the Nazi's degenerate Art exhibitions.

She was the long term partner of political cartoonist Will Dyson until his death in 1938. Fearing a German invasion of Britain she returned to Australia in 1940, partly because of her Jewish surname by marriage.
