= Heide Circle =

The Heide Circle was a loose grouping of Australian artists who lived and worked at "Heide", a former dairy farm on the Yarra River floodplain at Bulleen, a suburb of Melbourne, counting amongst their number many of Australia's best-known modernist painters.

== History ==
Heide was purchased in 1934 by John and Sunday Reed, passionate supporters and collectors of Australian art and culture. Amongst other activities, John Reed published the modernist literary magazine Angry Penguins, which earned its place in Australia's cultural history with the notorious Ern Malley hoax in 1943. John Reed was a Tasmanian-born solicitor and graduate of Cambridge University in 1924, whose association with art and design began in Melbourne in the mid 1920s, when he shared a home with illustrator and furniture designer Fred Ward. Around him were a circle of highly innovative and creative young and wealthy Melburnians including his sister Cynthia Reed Nolan, psychiatrist Reg Ellery, musicians Mansell Kirby and Bernard Heinze, curator Clarice Zander, artist Will Dyson and literary patrons Nettie Palmer and Vance Palmer, establishing a pattern that would extend into the years at Heide.

A number of modernist artists came to live and work at various times between the 1930s and 1950s at Heide, and many of the most famous works of the period were painted there. Albert Tucker, Sidney Nolan, Danila Vassilieff, Gray Smith and Joy Hester, amongst others, all worked at Heide. Nolan painted his famous series of Ned Kelly works in the living room there.

The Heide Circle is well known for the intertwined personal and professional lives of the people involved. Sunday Reed conducted affairs with a number of them, with the knowledge of her husband. Sidney Nolan's second wife Cynthia was John Reed's younger sister. The marriage of former Heide associates caused a permanent break between Nolan and Sunday Reed.

David Rainey's 2014 play The Ménage at Soria Moria is a fictitious performance piece exploring the relationship between the Reeds and Sidney Nolan – both the heady days at Heide during the 1940s, and the less well known degeneration over the next 35 years.

The Heide Circle continued in their commitment to Figurative Modernism through the 1950s and 1960s, with several of the artists forming a group known as the Antipodeans and taking a stand against the new abstract art.

Heide is located very close to Heidelberg, the area associated with a famous earlier Melbourne art movement, the Heidelberg School. The north-eastern fringes of Melbourne, particularly further out at Eltham, retain a close association with the visual arts.

The Heide Museum of Modern Art is now an art museum featuring most of the artists of the period, and actively supporting the development and promotion of contemporary art in Australia.

== See also ==
- Visual arts of Australia
- Heide Museum of Modern Art
