= Barrett Reid =

Australian poet and librarian (1926–1995)

Barrett Reid AM (1926–1995) was an Australian librarian, poet, and literary editor.

== Early life ==
Reid was born on 8 December 1926 in Eagle Junction, Queensland. He was the son of Effie (née Collins) and George Barrett Reid; his father was a nephew of Australian prime minister George Reid.

Reid was raised by his father after his mother died in 1928. He attended state schools at Chermside and Windsor, before attending Brisbane State High School. While in high school, he co-founded a literary journal with Laurence Collinson titled Barjai: A Meeting Place for Youth.

Reid moved to Melbourne in the early 1950s where he started working at the State Library of Victoria.

== Works ==
- Reid, Barrett, (1995). Making country. Sydney: Angus and Robertson (poetry)

== Editor ==
Reid was poetry editor of Overland from 1965 to 1988, then replaced Stephen Murray-Smith as editor from 1988 to 1993. He brought to the journal "a new aesthetic emphasis, which was evident in the enhanced visual appearance".

He was coeditor of Barjai with Laurence Collinson. Brisbane: Barjai Publishing Service, 1943–1947 periodical (15 issues)

He was coeditor of Ern Malley's Journal with Max Harris, and John Reed. 1952 periodical (4 issues)

He coedited Letters of John Reed : Defining Australian Cultural Life 1920–1981 by John Reed, Nancy Underhill. Ringwood : Viking, 2001

== Recognition ==
On Australia Day 1983, Reid was appointed a Member of the Order of Australia (AM) for services to librarianship.

The State Library of Victoria Barrett Reid Scholarship is awarded to Victorian public library employees to assist with professional development activities.

== Personal life ==
Reid was bisexual and in a long-term relationship with Philip Jones, who discussed their relationship and bisexuality in his memoir. Reid's bisexuality is also mentioned in Modern Love: The Lives of John and Sunday Reed. Although his sexuality was not a secret in Brisbane in the 1940s, he chose not to be publicly out when establishing his career in Melbourne libraries and only really came out after his retirement and death in his posthumously published book of poetry.
