= Contemporary Art Society (Australia) =

Australian organisation

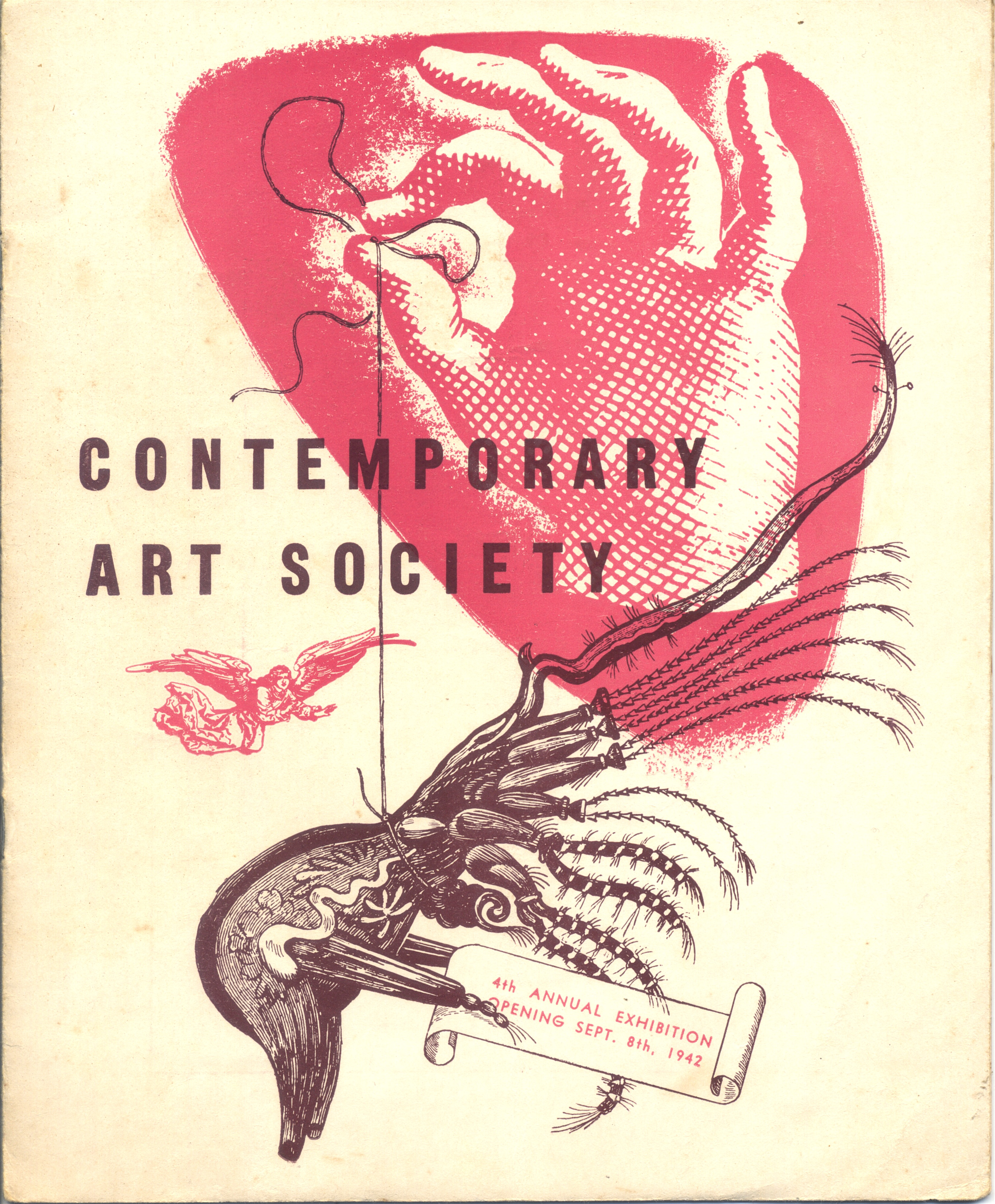
Contemporary Art Society NSW Newsletter 1942, designed by Al Morrison

The Contemporary Art Society is an Australian organisation formed in Victoria in 1938 to promote non-representative forms of art. Separate, autonomous branches were formed in each state of the Commonwealth by 1966, including the Contemporary Art Society of Australia (N.S.W.) in 1939 and the Contemporary Art Society of South Australia in 1942, although not all of them still exist today.

== Victoria ==
The Contemporary Art Society (now Contemporary Art Society of Victoria (Inc.) was established on 13 July 1938, by George Bell. It held its first exhibition in June 1939 at the National Gallery of Victoria, displaying works of artists from all over Australia. Members were not only committed to contemporary stylistic experimentation, but also to engagement with contemporary social realities, and in December 1942 sponsored an "Anti-fascist Exhibition" at Melbourne's Athenaeum Gallery. As well as showing Australian artists, the exhibition highlighted the work of German artist, Kathe Kollwitz.

However, Bell and others left the society over differences of opinion in 1940, and further differences among remaining members (who included Arthur Boyd, Sidney Nolan and John Perceval), led to suspension of the society in 1947.

In 1954 CAS was revived by John Reed. One of its first exhibitions was the Royal Tour Contemporary Art Exhibition in 1954 at Mirka Mora's studio in Melbourne, mounted as a protest against the Fellowship of Australian Artists royal exhibition. Two years later CAS and Reed founded the Gallery of Contemporary Art (later renamed Museum of Modern Art and Design of Australia) in Tavistock Place, a lane-way off 376 Flinders Street, Melbourne, which also housed its headquarters. It moved premises in 1963 to 9 Collins Street, Melbourne, in 1967 to 1 Fitzroy St, St Kilda (in 1970 taken over by Pinacotheca Art Gallery), to Kew and then South Yarra from 1972 to early 1989, after which they held exhibitions in other galleries.

The Contemporary Art Society of Victoria, as of 2021 based in Richmond, is a non-profit organisation, run by artists, for artists and those interested in the arts. It aims to hold four major exhibitions each year, manages three smaller spaces for smaller exhibitions, and also holds social events for its members.

== New South Wales ==
The Contemporary Art Society of Australia (N.S.W.) was founded in 1939 with Rah Fizelle president and Peter Bellew secretary. The NSW CAS's founding members promoted abstraction as a revolutionary art form and positioned the Society as an oppositional artist's group dedicated to the production of experimental art, attacking the values of the mainstream artist's groups such as the Society of Artists. The NSW branch had its first exhibition in Sydney in 1940. The Society purportedly differed from other local societies, in that it "concentrates on unconventional and experimental work".

Its third annual exhibition was held at the David Jones' Gallery in Sydney from 9 September – 4 October 1941.

In 1954, as a protest against the Archibald Prize, which it regarded as being biased, boring and of a low standard, the Contemporary Art Society initiated its own awards, with Michael Kmit the first nominated winner.

The Society appears to have wound up by 1970. Its records are held at the State Library of New South Wales.

== South Australia ==
The Contemporary Art Society of Australia S.A. was founded on 23 June 1942 with David Dallwitz as chairman and Joan Dallwitz as treasurer. In 1943 Max Harris was chairman and secretary. Ivor Francis was a foundation committee member, and became chair in 1944.

In 1986 the organisation became incorporated, was renamed the Contemporary Art Centre of South Australia, and became a publicly-funded organisation which ran nationally and internationally significant exhibitions.

From August 2016 CACSA started talks to merge with the Australian Experimental Art Foundation (AEAF) after two rounds of severe funding cuts to the Australia Council in the federal government budgets of 2014/15 and 2015/16. The newly created organisation resulting from the merger was named ACE Open.

== Queensland ==
The Contemporary Art Society, Queensland Branch, was founded in 1961, with Bernard Schaffer as president, Don Ross and Roy Churcher (husband of Betty Churcher and a key instigator of the formation of the society) as vice-presidents, and Ian Still as secretary. Gertrude Langer was a founding executive member, and Its inaugural public meeting to establish the society was on 14 September 1961 at St Mary's Church hall at Kangaroo Point.

The society was wound up in 1973.

== Tasmania ==
The Contemporary Art Society of Australia, Tasmania Branch, was founded in 1963, with Barclay Erskine president and Rosamund McCulloch secretary.

In 1972, the society awarded an art prize to Edith Lilla Holmes, and held an exhibition at the Tasmanian Museum and Art Gallery from 5 June 1973 to 24 June 1973.

== Western Australia ==
The Contemporary Art Society (WA Branch) was founded in 1966, with Guy Grey-Smith as inaugural president.
