= Joy Hester =

Australian artist (1920–1960)

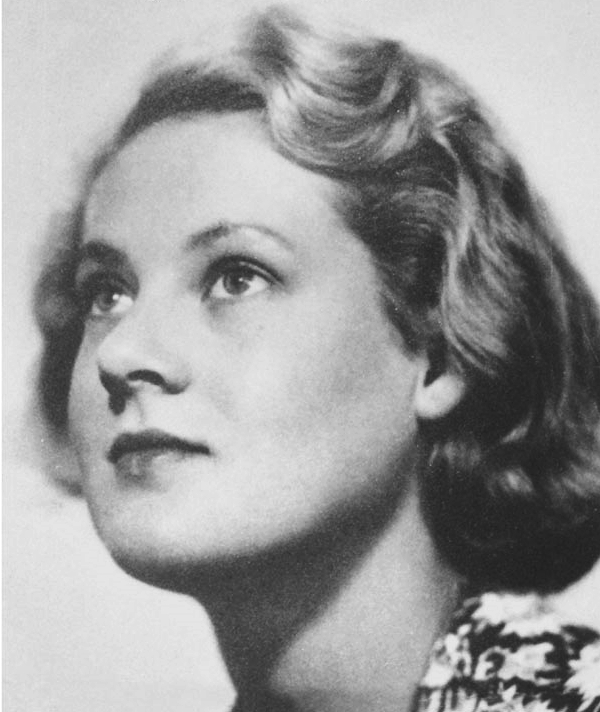
- Hester, c. 1940
- Born: Joy St Clair Hester; 21 August 1920; Melbourne, Victoria, Australia
- Died: 4 December 1960 (aged 40); Melbourne, Victoria, Australia
- Known for: Painting and drawing
- Notable work: Love series, Incredible night's dream series, Harry
- Movement: Angry Penguins
- Spouse(s): Albert Tucker (1941–1947); Gray Smith (1959–)

Joy St Clair Hester (21 August 1920 – 4 December 1960) was an Australian artist. She was a member of the Angry Penguins movement and the Heide Circle who played an integral role in the development of Australian Modernism. Hester is best known for her bold and expressive ink drawings. Her work was charged with a heightened awareness of mortality due to the death of her father during her childhood, the threat of war, and her personal experience with Hodgkin's disease. Hester is most well known for the series Face, Sleep, and Love (1948–49) as well as the later works, The Lovers (1956–58).

== Biography ==
=== Early life ===
Hester was born on the 21 August 1920 and raised in Elwood to middle-class parents Louise and Robert Hester. Robert died from a heart attack when Hester was twelve. Hester studied art from an early age and was a student at St Michael's Grammar School from 1933 to 1937. At 17, Hester enrolled in Commercial Art at Brighton Technical School for one year before leaving to attend the National Gallery School in Melbourne. Her curriculum was based in traditional media and practice, however Hester took the opportunity to break free from formal restraints. In 1938 Hester won the Gallery School's Drawing Head from Life prize. Taking up classes at both the Design school, and Painting and Life school gave her early recognition. Her work during this time, though bound by tradition, was concerned with shadow and tonal shading, the relationships between dark and light.

=== Heide period ===
In 1938 Hester met fellow artist Albert Tucker and began living with him intermittently in East Melbourne. During the same year Hester became a founding member of the Contemporary Art Society (CAS), exhibiting with them annually. Hester met Melbourne-based art patron Sunday Reed in 1939 at the Herald Exhibition, which brought British and French artworks to Australia for the first time. The two became friends, with Reed nurturing Hester's artistic talent. Spending much of her time at Heide with Sunday and her husband John Reed, Hester became a member of the Heide Circle. She was a contemporary of Sidney Nolan, Arthur Boyd, Charles Blackman, John Perceval, Yosl Bergner and Danila Vassilieff during this period. The Heide Circle worked as an extension of the Angry Penguins magazine. Hester was the only woman to be featured in the Angry Penguins publication.

One of her most significant works from this time was Nude Study, (c. 1939–41). It was her first use of bold, fluid black line work, which is what she is known for today.

During the early 40s, Hester began depicting the ambience of daily life, via ink drawings of street scenes and factory workers. She was influenced by artist Ailsa O'Connor, who had similar concerns in her work. Hester was also drawn to the work of Vassilieff for his philosophical views about how art and life could not be separated.

By the mid 40s, Hester relinquished her interest in oil painting to concentrate solely on watercolor and inks. Her focus shifted towards the motif of the human face, specifically the expression in the eyes. Using minimal and assertive ink strokes, she rendered her figures with emotional intensity. A Frightened Woman (1945) served as a seminal point in establishing Hester's style and media moving forward. Her works aimed to capture the psychological horror of World War II.

Hester and Tucker married 1941. Five years later Hester gave birth to a son, Sweeney Reed (1944–1979). In 1947, when Sweeney was three, Hester was diagnosed with terminal Hodgkin's lymphoma. Believing she had only 2 years to live, she decided to move to Sydney to live with Melbourne artist Gray Smith, and gave her son into the care of John and Sunday Reed, who subsequently adopted him. Illness impacted heavily on Hester's work and left an indelible mark, loading it with emotional content. During this period Hester produced the drawings that became part of her notable Face, Sleep and Love series. These works were exhibited alongside Hester's poetry in 1950 at her first solo show at the Melbourne Bookclub Gallery.

=== Later life ===
Hester had two subsequent solo exhibitions in 1955 and 1956 but struggled to sell her art. She typically worked on a small scale in black ink and wash, however, Australian modernism favoured large oil paintings, like those of Nolan. Hester's work failed to garner the same recognition her male peers received, dismissed by critics as "angst-ridden".

The Lovers series (1956–58) were indicative of her maturing and expressive style. She also published poetry and used her drawings to illustrate her words.

Joy and Smith had two children, a son, Peregrine, in 1951, and a daughter, Fern, in 1954. The couple married in 1959. After a period of remission Hester suffered a relapse of Hodgkin's lymphoma in 1956 and died on 4 December 1960, aged 40. Hester was laid to rest at the Box Hill Cemetery in an unmarked grave, at her behest.

== Legacy ==
John and Sunday Reed organised a commemorative exhibition of Hester's work in 1963. In 1978, a street in the Canberra suburb of Chisholm was named Hester Place in her honour. In 1981, Janine Burke, Hester's biographer, curated the first major retrospective at the National Gallery of Victoria. Hester's life and work was the subject of a documentary, The Good Looker, in 1995. A plaque was erected in 1999 at the Box Hill Cemetery in honour of Hester's contribution to the arts. Reviewing her work for Time in 2001, Michael Fitzgerald wrote "Forty-one years after her death, Hester's drawings still suck the oxygen from the air, providing some of the clearest-eyed images in Australian art". In 2018 her Love and The Lovers series of works featured in a joint exhibit with Patricia Piccinini at TarraWarra Museum of Art. Piccinini credited Hester as a major influence on her own practice; stating: "I love the way her painting, especially those with merged features, are simultaneously surreal and figurative. I am really interested in depictions of love and intimacy in my own work, so I find Hester's approach very inspiring".

Three plays have been written about her life: Joy by Christine Croyden, Hester by Wendy Beckett. Joy Hester's art was included in the exhibition, Know My Name: Australian Women Artists 1900 to Now at the National Gallery of Australia, in 2021-2022, and ‘Where is Joy?’ by Emma Louise Pursey, a one-woman show performed by the playwright at fortyfivedownstairs in Melbourne in 2025.

== Exhibitions ==
=== Solo exhibitions ===
- Melbourne Book Club Gallery, 6 February 1950 – 17 February 1950, Melbourne, Victoria, Australia.
- Mirka Cafe, July – August, Melbourne, Victoria, Australia.
- Gallery of Contemporary Art, 9 April 1957 – 23 April 1957, Melbourne, Victoria, Australia.

==== Posthumous solo exhibitions ====
- Joy Hester, 3 September 1963 – 21 September 1963, Museum of Modern Art and Design of Australia, Melbourne, Victoria, Australia.
- Drawings by Joy from a private collection, 2 August 1966 – 12 August 1966, South Yarra Galleries, Melbourne, Victoria, Australia.
- Joy Hester Graphics, 20 October 1970 – 2 November 1970, Australian Galleries, Melbourne, Victoria, Australia.
- Joy Hester, 6 October 1976 – 25 October 1976, Tolarno Galleries, Melbourne, Victoria, Australia.
- Joy Hester, April 1977 – May 1977, Philip Bacon Galleries, Brisbane, Queensland, Australia.
- Joy Hester, Early Works on Paper, 14 June 1980 – 3 July 1980, Tolarno Galleries, Melbourne, Victoria, Australia.
- Joy Hester Retrospective, 29 September 1981 – 5 December 1981, National Gallery of Victoria, Melbourne, Victoria, Australia.
- Joy Hester, Early Works, 2 March 1982 – 18 March 1982, Tolarno Galleries, Melbourne, Victoria, Australia.
- Joy Hester: Remember Me, 28 November 2020 – 21 February 2021, Heide Museum of Modern Art, Melbourne, Victoria, Australia.

=== Group exhibitions ===
- Contemporary Art Society Inaugural Exhibition, 6 June 1939 – 25 June 1939, National Gallery of Victoria, Melbourne, Victoria, Australia.
- Contemporary Art Society Annual Exhibition, 12 October 1941 – 31 October 1941, Hotel Australia, Melbourne, Victoria, Australia.
- Contemporary Art Society Annual Exhibition, 4 August 1942 – 15 August 1942, Athenaeum Art Gallery, Melbourne, Victoria, Australia.
- Contemporary Art Society Annual Exhibition, 4 August 1943 – 15 August 1943, Velasquez Gallery, Melbourne, Victoria, Australia.
- Contemporary Art Society Annual Exhibition, 21 August 1945 – 31 August 1945, Myer Gallery, Melbourne, Victoria, Australia.
- Contemporary Art Society Annual Exhibition, November 1946, Education Building, Sydney, New South Wales, Australia.
- Royal Tour Contemporary Art Exhibition, February 1954 – March 1954, Mirka's Studio, Melbourne, Victoria, Australia.
- Contemporary Art Society Commemorative Exhibition, 6 April 1954 – 23 April 1954, Tye's Gallery, Melbourne, Victoria, Australia.
- Contemporary Art Society Annual Exhibition, 10 May 1955 – 21 May 1955, Preston Motors, Melbourne, Victoria, Australia.
- Contemporary Art Society Drawing Exhibition, 19 October 1955 – November 1955, Mirka's Studio, Melbourne, Victoria, Australia.
- Inaugural Gift Exhibition, 1 June 1956 – 16 June 1956, Gallery of Contemporary Art, Melbourne, Victoria Australia.
- Olympic Exhibition, 16 November 1956 – 18 December 1956, organised by the Contemporary Art Society in conjunction with the Gallery of Contemporary Art, Melbourne, Victoria, Australia.
- Poem, March 1957 – April 1957, Gallery of Contemporary Art, Melbourne, Victoria, Australia.
- Contemporary Art Society Annual interstate Exhibition, 26 November 1957 – 6 December 1957, Gallery of Contemporary Art, Melbourne, Victoria, Australia.
- Collection, 30 September 1958 – 10 October 1958, Museum of Modern Art of Australia, Melbourne, Victoria, Australia.
- Herald Outdoor Art Show, 6 March 1959 – 14 March 1959, Treasury Gardens, Melbourne, Australia.

==== Posthumous group exhibitions ====
- Paintings from the collection of Mr & Mrs Carnegie, 27 October 1966 – 30 November 1966, National Gallery of Victoria, Melbourne, Victoria, Australia.
- Paintings from the collection of Allen D. Christensen, 7 December 1976 – 22 December 1976, National Gallery of Victoria, Melbourne, Victoria, Australia.
- The Heroic Years of Australian Painting: 1940–65, 1977, touring exhibition.
- Project 21: Women's Images of Women, 15 October 1977 – 13 November 1977, Art Gallery of New South Wales, Sydney, New South Wales, Australia.
- Spring Exhibition, 24 October 1977 – 7 November 1977, Joseph Brown Gallery, Melbourne, Victoria, Australia.
- Genesis of a Gallery, Part 2, 1978, from the Collection of the Australian National Gallery, touring exhibition.
- Autumn Exhibition, 7 April 1978 – 20 April 1978, Joseph Brown Gallery, Melbourne, Victoria, Australia.
- Aspects of Australian Drawing, 1979, Art Gallery of Western Australia, touring exhibition.
- Australian Drawings of the Thirties and Forties, 21 February 1980 – 1 April 1980, National Gallery of Victoria, Melbourne, Victoria, Australia.
- Inaugural Exhibition, 12 November 1981 – January 1982, Heide Park and Gallery, Melbourne, Victoria, Australia.
- Glimpses of the Forties, 12 September 1982 – 7 November 1982, Heide Park and Gallery, Melbourne, Victoria, Australia.
- In the Company of Women: 100 years of Australian women's art from the Cruthers collection, 16 February 1995 – 13 March 1995, Perth Institute of Contemporary Arts, Western Australia.
- Women Hold Up Half the Sky, March 1995 – April 1995, National Gallery of Australia, Canberra, ACT, Australia.
- Review, 8 March 1995 – 8 June 1995, Art Gallery of New South Wales, Sydney, New South Wales, Australia.
- Eveolution: An exhibition of women's art from the Newcastle Region Art Gallery collection, 1995, 9 March 1995 – June 1995, Newcastle Region Art Gallery, Newcastle, New South Wales, Australia.
- A l'hombre des jeunes filles et des fleurs: In the shadow of young girls and flowers, 10 March 1995 – 28 May 1995, Benalla Art Gallery, Benalla, Victoria, Australia.
- Arthur Boyd: Family and Friends, 1997, Ballarat Fine Art Gallery, Ballarat, Victoria, Australia.
- Modern Australian Women: paintings and prints 1925–1945, 24 November 2000 – 25 February 2001, Art Gallery of South Australia, Adelaide, South Australia, Australia.
- Joy Hester and Friends, 1 September 2001 – 28 October 2001, National Gallery of Australia, ACT, Australia.
- Those Who Made and Those Who Saw: Portraits of the Heide Circle, 3 November 2007 – 15 June 2008, Heide Museum of Modern Art, Bulleen, Victoria.
- Look, Look Again, 20 October 2011 – 15 December 2012, Lawrence Wilson Art Gallery, University of Western Australia, Perth, Western Australia.
- Patricia Piccinini and Joy Hester: Through Love…, 24 November 2018 – 11 March 2019, Tarrawarra Museum of Art, Healesville, Victoria, Australia.
- Know My Name: Australian Women Artists 1900 to Now, 2021-2022, National Gallery of Australia, ACT, Australia.

== Collections ==
Hester's prominence, alongside her Heide Circle counterparts, in shaping Australian modernism have resulted in many Australian institutions acquiring her work.

- Art Gallery of New South Wales (Sydney, NSW)
- Art Gallery of South Australia (Adelaide, SA)
- Art Gallery of Western Australia (Perth, WA)
- Ballarat Fine Art Gallery (Ballarat, VIC)
- Benalla Art Gallery (Benalla, VIC)
- Castlemaine Art Gallery and Historical Museum (Castlemaine, VIC)
- Cruthers Collection of Women's Art at the University of Western Australia (Perth, WA)
- Heide Museum of Modern Art (Bulleen, Melbourne, VIC)
- La Trobe Collection, State Library Of Victoria (Melbourne, VIC)
- Mornington Peninsula Arts Centre (Mornington Peninsula, VIC)
- Newcastle Art Gallery (Newcastle, NSW)
- Northern Territory Museum and Art Gallery, (Darwin, NT)
- Parliament House (Canberra, ACT)
- Queensland Art Gallery (Brisbane, QLD)
- Tasmanian Museum and Art Gallery (Hobart, TAS)
- The National Gallery of Australia (Canberra, ACT)
- The National Gallery of Victoria (Melbourne, VIC)
- University of Adelaide (Adelaide, SA)
- University of Melbourne (Melbourne, VIC)
- University of Western Australia Art Collection (Perth, WA)
- Warrnambool Art Gallery (Warrnambool, VIC)

== Published poems, letters and miscellaneous ==
- To the Editor, Argus, 23 August 1940, p. 5.
- "Untitled", A Comment, March 1943, no. 5, n.p.
- "Micetto, Father of Kisses", and "Awake", Ern Malley's Journal, vol. 1, no. 1, November, 1952, pp. 18–19
- Memorial Exhibition of Painting and Sculpture of Danila Cassilieff, Museum of Modern Art, Melbourne, June, 1956. Catalogue note by Hester.
