= John Perceval =

Australian artist

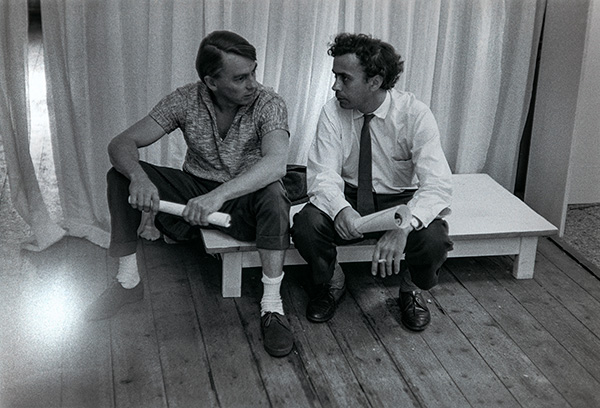
- John Perceval (left) and Laurence Hope (right) at the Museum of Modern Art Australia, Melbourne, 1961
- Born: Linwood Robert Steven South; 1 February 1923; Bruce Rock, Western Australia, Australia
- Died: 15 October 2000 (aged 77); Melbourne, Victoria, Australia
- Known for: Painter, ceramicist
- Awards: McCaughey Prize (1958); Wynne Prize (1960); Officer of the Order of Australia (1991)

John de Burgh Perceval AO (1 February 1923 – 15 October 2000) was a well-known Australian artist. Perceval was the last surviving member of a group known as the Angry Penguins who redefined Australian art in the 1940s. Other members included John Reed, Joy Hester, Sidney Nolan, Arthur Boyd and Albert Tucker. He was also an Antipodean and contributed to the Antipodeans exhibition of 1959.

== Biography ==
Perceval was born Linwood Robert Steven South on 1 February 1923 at Bruce Rock, Western Australia, the second child of Robert South (a wheat farmer) and Dorothy (née Dolton). His parents separated in 1925 and he remained at his father's farm until reunited with his mother and travelling to Melbourne in 1935. Following the marriage of his mother to William de Burgh Perceval, he changed his name to John and adopted the surname de Burgh Perceval.

In 1938 Perceval contracted polio and was hospitalised, giving him the opportunity to further his skills at drawing and painting. Enlisting in the army in 1941 Perceval first met and befriended Arthur Boyd. After leaving the army and moving into the Boyd family home, "Open Country", Murrumbeena, he married Boyd's younger sister Mary Boyd in 1944. Together he and Mary Boyd produced four children.

Perceval held his first solo exhibition at the Melbourne Book Club in 1948 and showed regularly with the Contemporary Art Society. Between 1949 and 1955 he concentrated on producing earthenware ceramics and helped to establish the Arthur Merric Boyd Pottery in Murrumbeena. Returning to painting in 1956 Perceval produced a series of images of Williamstown and Gaffney's Creek.

Moving to England in 1963 Perceval held solo exhibitions in London, and travelled to Europe, before returning to Australia in 1965 to take up the first Australian National University Creative Fellowship. John Perceval, a major retrospective exhibition, was held at Albert Hall, Canberra in 1966. Author Margaret Plant's monograph John Perceval, was published in 1971.

Suffering from alcoholism, and later in life from schizophrenia, in 1974 Perceval was committed to the psychiatric hospital Larundel, Melbourne, where he remained until 1981. John Perceval: A Retrospective Exhibition of Paintings was held at Heide Park and Art Gallery in 1984. He was awarded Officer of the Order of Australia (AO) in 1991, the year before the National Gallery of Victoria held John Perceval: A Retrospective, where writer and art historian, Traudi Allen's John Perceval was launched. A second, entirely revised and updated edition of this publication was released in 2015.

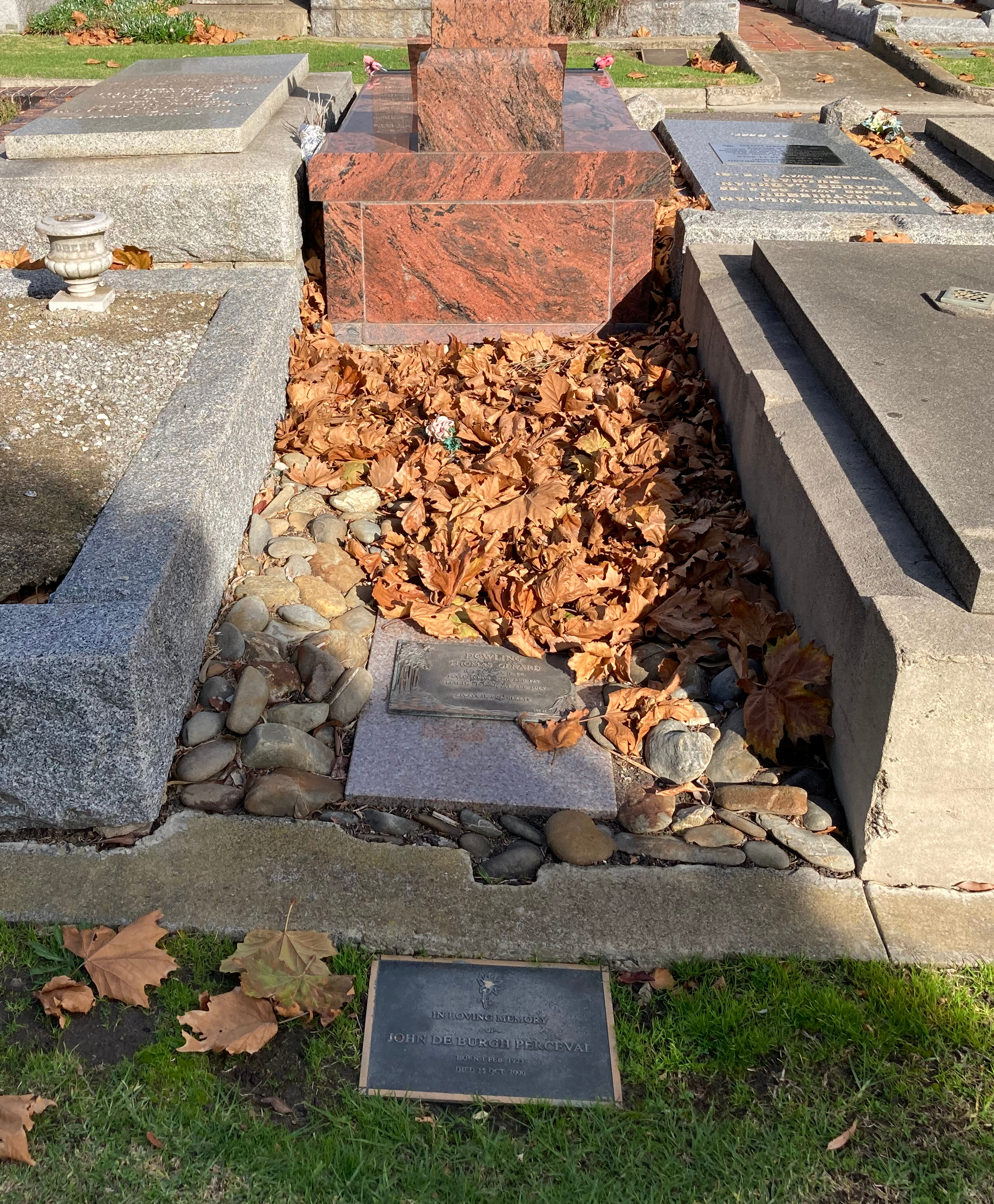
Perceval's grave (front) at Brighton General Cemetery

In 2000 from 19 August to 19 October John Perceval Retrospective Exhibition was held in Galeria Aniela Fine Art Gallery and Sculpture Park. It was officially opened by the Chairman of Sotheby’s (it included 80 oil paintings and works on paper from 1946 to 1999). It was Perceval's last retrospective and was mentioned on ABC TV's National News.

Prior to his death Scudding Swans (1959) sold for $552,500, a record for a living Australian painter. In March 2010, it was sold for $690,000.

Perceval died on 15 October 2000, and was buried at Brighton General Cemetery. He was survived by his four children; Matthew, Tessa, Celia and Alice, all of whom are practising artists today.

== Honours and awards ==
- 1958: McCaughey Prize
- 1959: Maude Vizard-Wholohan Prize, Art Gallery of South Australia
- 1960: Wynne Prize for Dairy Farm, Victoria
- 1991: Officer of the Order of Australia for service to the visual arts
