= John Reed (art patron) =

Australian art patron

- Born: John Harford Reed; 10 December 1901; Evandale, Tasmania, Australia
- Died: 5 December 1981 (aged 79); Heidelberg, Victoria, Australia
- Occupations: Art editor and patron
- Spouse: Sunday Reed (m. 1932–1981)
- Children: 1

John Harford Reed (10 December 1901 – 5 December 1981) was an Australian art editor and patron, notable for supporting and collecting of Australian art and culture with his wife Sunday Reed.

== Biography ==
=== Early life ===
Reed was born at 'Logan', near Evandale near Launceston, Tasmania, one of six children of wealthy English-born grazier Henry Reed and his wife Lila Borwick, born Dennison in the Orkney Islands, Scotland. Reed's youngest sister, Cynthia later married artist and printmaker Sidney Nolan. In 1911 the Reeds left Launceston for England to enhance their children's education. When World War I broke out they returned to Tasmania to settle with John Reed's grandmother at Mount Pleasant, a mansion in Prospect, Tasmania. His grandfather was Henry Reed. He attended Geelong Grammar between 1915 and 1920, and subsequently went to England to study law at Gonville and Caius College, Cambridge University gaining a BA, LL.B, in 1924.

=== Heide Circle ===
After graduating Reed returned to Australia to practise law in Melbourne, where he met Sunday Baillieu. They married on 13 January 1932. In 1934, they purchased a former dairy farm on the Yarra River floodplain at Bulleen, a suburb of Melbourne, which became known as Heide. A number of modernist artists, known as the Heide Circle came to live and work at Heide at various times during the 1930s, '40s and '50s, and consequently many of the most famous works of the period were painted there. Albert Tucker, Sidney Nolan, and Joy Hester, among others, all worked at Heide. Nolan painted his famous series of Ned Kelly works in its living room.

The Heide Circle is studied for the entwined personal and professional lives of the people involved. Sunday Reed conducted affairs with a number of them, with the knowledge of her husband. Now famously, Sidney Nolan lived in a ménage à trois with John and Sunday Reed at Heide for several years until July 1947. As much as Garsington in England gained notoriety, in Australian culture so did Heide. Philippe Mora in his film Absolutely Modern, 2013, found material in 1940s Heide and interpreted Modernism, the role of female muse, and sexuality in Art of the period. David Rainey's 2014 play The Ménage at Soria Moria is a fictitious performance piece exploring the relationship between the Reeds and Sidney Nolan – both the heady days at Heide during the 1940s, and the less well known degeneration over the next 35 years, which is also the subject of Kendrah Morgan's and Lesley Harding's 2015 Modern Love: The Lives of John and Sunday Reed.

=== Angry Penguins ===
John discontinued his legal practice in 1943. After reading the first issue of the modernist literary magazine, Angry Penguins, Reed visited its editor, Max Harris, in Adelaide and by the end of World War II he and Sunday had become the major supporters of modern art in Australia, and he took on management of Victoria's Contemporary Art Society (CAS). Reed became the publisher of Angry Penguins, upon which was subsequently perpetrated the notorious Ern Malley hoax. This resulted in prosecution of Harris by South Australian police for publishing immoral and obscene material, after which the magazine soon folded.

=== Gallery director ===
In 1958 with the assistance of businessman, restaurateur, art dealer and close friend Georges Mora, and using their own funds, the Reeds transformed the Contemporary Art Society gallery, where George's wife Mirka had exhibited in August the year before, into the 'Museum of Modern Art (and Design) of Australia' (MOMAA), modelled on MoMA in New York, with John as its director and located in Tavistock Place, a lane-way off 376 Flinders Street, Melbourne. To commemorate the start of MOMAA, John Reed sent a Gray Smith painting called 'The Tank' to MoMA. MOMAA held exhibitions of important contemporary Australian and international art of the late 1950s and early 1960s. Daughter of Myer Emporium director Sir Norman Myer, Pamela Warrender, whom Mora came to know through their visits to his Balzac Restaurant, a gathering-place for artists, became chair of the museum. The Museum operated until 1966 and was formally dissolved in 1981 for the Reeds' establishment of the Heide Museum of Modern Art which opened in November 1981.

=== Death ===
Reed died in his home on 5 December 1981 five days before his 80th birthday and almost a month before his 50th wedding anniversary. Sunday Reed died 10 days after him on 15 December.

== Bibliography ==
- Reid, Barrett; Underhill, Nancy, eds. (2001). Letters of John Reed: defining Australia's cultural life, 1920–1981. Ringwood, Vic: Viking. p. 943. ISBN 0-670-81506-3.
- Lesley Harding & Kendrah Morgan (2015) Modern love: the lives of John & Sunday Reed, Carlton, Victoria The Miegunyah Press, an imprint of Melbourne University Publishing Limited, in association with Heide Museum of Modern Art, State Library Victoria. ISBN 9780522862812
