= Peter Burns (architect) =

Australian architect

Peter Bryant Burns (27 June 1924 – 1 March 2020) was an Australian architect and artist who practised from 1952 to 1989. He was known for his involvement in Contemporary Art Society exhibitions, his co-founding of the journal Architecture and Arts and his contributions to the Australian post-war Modern Art movement.

== Personal life ==
Peter Burns was born in Geelong, Victoria, on 27 June 1924. He began his architectural studies under the patronage of the Commonwealth Reconstruction Training Scheme, after serving in the Royal Australian Air Force (RAAF) as an aircrew trainee. From 1947 – 1953 he completed a Fellowship Diploma in architecture, first from the Melbourne Technical College (presently known as RMIT) and then the University of Melbourne. Burns died in 2020.

=== Magazine ===
In 1949, at the age of 25, Burns founded the magazine Architecture and Arts with his colleagues, James Birrell, Helen O’Donnell and Norman Lehey, and was responsible for editing the first five issues himself. After graduating in 1953 Burns drew the attention of art enthusiast John Reed, who was intrigued by Burn's contribution to the magazine. Their mutual appreciation for Modern Art in Melbourne flourished into a friendship and brought Burns into the social group, known as the Contemporary Arts Society (CAS). Within the CAS, Burns was able to associate with many contemporary artists, actors, writers, poets, photographers and filmmakers of the time, which allowed him to further explore his passion for contemporary art.

== Career ==
Burns worked as a draftsman until 1962, before starting own architectural firm where he worked as a director until 1977. While making a living through his practice in architecture, he was just as well known for his frequent involvements in CAS exhibitions, being a talented graphic designer and artist. He held numerous one-man exhibitions throughout 1957 till 1971, with several exhibitions held in the Museum of Modern Art of Australia, Melbourne (MOMA) in 1958 and 1959. He also had exhibitions in the Dominion Galleries, Sydney in 1963 and the Llewellyn Galleries, Adelaide in 1969.

=== Style ===
His architectural work is characterised by sloped interior walls that emphasise motifs of shelter and produce a strong directional effect. When viewed in plan, his work displays geometric shapes and patterns consistent with his influences from, and contributions to, the modern art movement. These include large open spheres and elliptical mouth like shapes.

Burns's art is often viewed as difficult and unsettling, often including surreal amalgamations of human body parts and geometric shapes. His work combines elements of architectural draftsmanship into an organic setting, forcing a juxtaposition of ideas that critics have found challenging to describe.

== Notable projects ==
=== Reed House (unbuilt) ===
Although unbuilt, the design of the Reed beach house went on to influence Heide II and have a large impact on postwar Melbourne Modernism. His four designs included bunker like enclosures with sloping walls and referenced coastal themes, such as boats and cannons. Reed initially confided in Burns to design his beach house as an experiment to push Modernist architecture in Melbourne in preparation for the renovation of Heide. However, they ultimately deferred Burns' design in favour of David McGlashan, whose project reflected the bay and sand dunes while protecting a central courtyard. Despite the house not being built, Burns re-used many of the ideas further on in his career, cementing the importance of the notable designs.

=== Mora House ===
In 1960 fellow art enthusiast Georges Mora asked Burns to design a simple open plan beach house in Aspendale. The Mora's Beach house was to reside adjacent to the Reeds' Beach house, both families being involved in CAS. These two separate houses were designed individually but also allowing them to function as a single holiday house between friends. Every summer Burns would accompany his fellow artists to parties at the Moras' and Reeds' Beach houses, a place where they could paint the horizon over the bay and enjoy the company and ideas of others in CAS.

=== Kangaroo ===
The Burns House, known as Kangaroo, was designed by Burns and built in stages from 1968 on an elevated sloping bush land site at Bend of Islands, near Kangaroo Ground, Victoria. It is considered of architectural and historical significance to the State of Victoria.

== Awards ==
• 1951 – Professor of Architecture's Art Prize- University of Melbourne

• 1956 – Olympic Medal for Domestic Architecture

• 1969 – Medal and certificate – third International Festival of Architectural films - Buenos Aires Argentina

• 1974 – Armitage Art Award – First Prize – Judge Dr Eric Westbrook

• 1975 – Armitage Art Award – Second Prize – Judge Leonard French

• 2007 - The AA Prize for Unbuilt Work
