= William Peascod =

William Peascod (3 May 1920 – 1985) was a British abstract painter, potter, teacher, and in the 1940s, a renowned rock climber. He was born in Cumbria, and died in Wales.

== Early years ==
Peascod was born in Ellenborough, Cumbria, where he worked as a coal miner from age 14, and enjoyed mountaineering and painting in his spare time.

== Australia and artistic career ==
Arriving in Australia in 1952 Peascod lectured in mining at Wollongong Technical College.

Around 1959 Peascod met Tom Gleghorn, who had a great influence on his work. He had his first one-man exhibition in Sydney in 1961, and over 25 February – 12 March 1963 joined Gleghorn in a survey show at the Museum of Modern Art Australia, Melbourne of paintings from galleries in all states with Sam Atyeo, Ralph Balson, Arthur Boyd, Sam Byrne, Len Crawford, Arch Cuthbertson, Lawrence Daws, Ian Fairweather, Leonard French, James Gleeson, Dennis Grafton, Jacqueline Hick, Frank Hodgkinson, Anton Holzner, Laurence Hope, Robert Hughes, Louis James, Peter Kaiser, Robert Juniper, Colin Lanceley, Donald Laycock, Elwyn Lynn, Dusan Marek, Erica McGilchrist, Brian McKay, Mervyn Moriarty, John Olsen, Desiderius Orban, Carl Plate, Emmanuel Raft, Charles Reddington, Robert Rooney, William Rose, Gareth Sansom, Dawn Sime, Eric Smith, Robin Wallace-Crabbe, Dick Watkins, Ken Whisson, Peter Upward.

Peascod worked and studied at the Seika College of Arts, Kyoto, Japan 1971–1972, before returning to Australia to teach at the Canberra School of Art.

== Return to Britain and climbing ==
In 1980, Peascod returned to Great Britain, where he continued his climbing exploits. A biography of Bill Peascod's pioneering Lakeland achievements was written by Bill Birkett, first published in 1983 and republished in 2011.

In 1985, Bill Peascod re-climbed one of his classic Lakeland rock routes, Eagle Front in Eagle Crag, Buttermere, graded VS 4C, with Chris Bonington for a TV documentary film, 45 years after he had made the first ascent.

== Death and legacy ==
Bill Peascod died aged 65 from a heart attack while climbing in North Wales with Don Whillans on 17 May 1985. According to Bill Birkett, Whillans was leading the first pitch of Colin Kirkus' classic climb 'Great Slab' on Clogwyn du'r Arddu with Peascod on belay. Birkett, who was watching, photographed the pair as Whillans started off, and moments after, Bill Peascod succumbed to a massive heart attack and died.

Peascod's autobiography, Journey After Dawn was published in 1985. In 1986 the University of Wollongong held a major retrospective at their "Long Gallery", featuring over 40 of his artworks.

=== Oral history ===
Peascod was interviewed in 1965 by Hazel de Berg. The recording can be found at the National Library of Australia.
