= Group M =

Mid-twentieth century Australian photography association

Group M was an Australian association of photographers who between 1959 and 1965 mounted exhibitions that advocated for photography to be treated as art, and were formative in a revival of the medium in the nation, the awareness of Australian photography internationally, and its acceptance into mainstream galleries in the 1970s.

== Moggs Creek Clickers ==
In 1955 Group M originated in the 'Moggs Creek Clickers' named for a locale near the creek of that name, where several members, mostly science and education professionals, had holiday houses and who joined through its association with Melbourne University. A newspaper report of the time numbered the members at 140 and new recruits were invited, but the core group remained around 8–10, initially all men though one woman who joined was Zillah Lee who handled submissions for their exhibitions. They issued a newsletter The Last Shot thrice yearly in which they promoted 'creative freedom', rather than the adherence to outmoded 1930s pictorialism then perpetuated by the Melbourne Camera Club. As member John Crook noted in a catalogue of their 1964 touring exhibition;

"It would be satisfying to think that the Australian photographer of today has 126 glorious years to draw inspiration from ... over a century of great works, a wonderful photographic heritage . .. But it is not so. We study the past very little. What greatness is there, is hardly known to those practising photography in Australia today. There have been two major periods: straight documentary (the second half of last century), and its antithesis, 'Pictorialism', in the first half of this century. The real, then the romantic [ . . . ] 'Artistic' photography spread [ . . . ] A well organised club and exhibition system supported this academic approach. Pictorialism was in; there was little else for over forty years."

Instead they championed 'straight', unmanipulated photography that transparently represented its subject, declaring; "We are certain that the majority of people appreciate philosophical thinking and social comment expressed through photography."

== International influences ==
The Moggs Creek Clickers in their newsletter alerted members to the arrival, in Australia, of Edward Steichen's MoMA exhibition The Family of Man which toured from February to July 1959, opening in Melbourne at the Preston Motors Show Room on February 23, before moving on to Sydney, Brisbane and Adelaide. It had a lasting influence on the group and other photographers who saw it in Australia, including John Cato, Paul Cox, and Robert McFarlane as well as Graham McCarter who, seeing the show, was motivated to take up photojournalism.

In 1959 the group held their first exhibition, in rented premises in Pink Alley off Little Collins St., Melbourne, naming it, and subsequent shows, Photovision. Considering 'Clickers' not serious enough, they renamed themselves Group M. They mounted six major exhibitions between 1959 and 1965, all titled Photovision, at first open to international photographers, but from 1963 restricted to Australians. Their annual exhibitions moved to John Reed's and Georges Mora's Melbourne Museum of Modern Art in Tavistock Place off Flinders Street.

Display of work there followed, in a more modest manner, the innovations of Steichen's designer, the architect Paul Rudolph, with large unframed prints on floating panels, some mural sized, in three-dimensional, walk-through arrangements, and introduced the more recent innovation of projections of colour transparencies with a soundtrack. Also like Steichen's Family, the images and exhibitions were organised into themes.

Other influences cited by Crook included photographs of Hiroshima, the grimly apocalyptic 1959 movie On the Beach filmed in Melbourne, and local contemporaries; the painters of urban estrangement, John Brack and Arthur Boyd. He identified a collective photographic consciousness inspired by magazines such as Life, and photographers Henri Cartier-Bresson, W. Eugene Smith, Bill Brandt and Robert Capa; "Important work from before the war, like the documents of the US Farm Security Administration, were also being seen here for the first time. It made us realise the potential of photography." Their photographs, rather than sitting "quietly on the walls", were used "as a force" to lead an "assault' on vision of the kind being experienced in public advertising and publicity, exploiting the attention-grabbing potential of blow-ups on panels without glass in a shift away from the camera club reverence for the fine print.

Their 1963 show Urban Woman was the most direct response to The Family of Man, attracting a wide audience. Though all the pictures were by men, it documented sociological and psychological aspects of the contemporary urban woman's life, with sympathy for the phenomenon of the house-bound woman, isolated in the suburbs after her military activity or workforce presence during the war. The show toured for four years, to Sydney, Adelaide and Perth, and in 1968 it formed part of Australia's cultural contribution to the Mexico Olympics. However, when the photographs eventually arrived back to Australia in 1971, they were so badly damaged they had to be destroyed.

== Legacy ==
The central figures in Group M were George W Bell (1920–2008); John Crook, teacher (1927–2012); Albert Brown, industrial chemist (1931–2017); Cliff Restarick, mineral engineer with CSIRO and musician; Roy McDonald, teacher; John Bolton; Richard Woldendorp; Harry Youlden; Fred Mosse; Tony Taylor. The prime mover was John Crook, who with the more artistic George Bell had made contact with John Reed. Albert Brown, a later recruit of the Clickers, promoted the group and documentary photography to galleries, museums, and universities. He corresponded with German-born British-based photographic historian Helmut Gernsheim, who wrote: "You seem to entirely agree with me that documentation is the most important function of photography today". Director of the National Gallery of Victoria, Eric Westbrook appointed him as an honorary photographic consultant in November 1966 in which position he was instrumental in 1966 in the establishment of the photography collection and he joined Westbrook Allan Martin, M. Marwick and Geoffrey Blainey in persuading the Gallery Trustees to approve the establishment a Department of Photography, and from 1969 was on an advisory Photographic Subcommittee with Dacre Stubbs, Les Gray, Lenton Parr. The photography department's first exhibition was MoMA's The Photographer's Eye curated by John Szarkowski which Brown helped secure.

The conscription of some younger group members to serve in the Vietnam War prompted four Group M members to stage the 1965 Photovision, A Time to Love, an exhibition with works by John Crook, Albert Brown, George Bell and Roy McDonald, which depicted bushfires, old people, handicapped children and the Lake Tyers Aboriginal mission. Roy McDonald, who went on to be a teacher of Latin and classics at Melbourne Grammar exploited the fact that his mother worked in a mental health hospital to go and photograph some of the inmates and nurses, and recorded archaic treatment of mental conditions not only of adults but also of young children who he said were so starved for affection that they clung to him as he tried to take pictures.

Albert Brown sent 15 photographs from each section to the University of Texas where they were included in the Gernsheim collection of over 30,000 photographs; John Crook remarked that "The University of Texas is now apparently taking a keen Interest in Australia and Australiana, and is looking to us as a place to collect from. In return for our plotures, the university sent us 100 copy negatives of famous historical pictures." They were printed to form an exhibition of 85 photographs "reflecting war, revolution, technical achievements and human life in the 100 years from 1842 to 1942," selected and sequenced chronologically by Allan Martin, Professor of History at La Trobe University. Funds of their own and sponsors covered the cost of printing the negatives and designer Derrick Watson's lay-out of this their last exhibition, at the Argus Gallery in Latrobe Street in November 1966.

The group planned a further exhibition A Portrait of a Nation to record of the "relations of Australians with their environment", and "nationally important aspects of their life", but despite their approaches to the Federal government, Reserve Bank and National Library, no funding was forthcoming and the project lapsed.

Though Group M was short-lived and its exhibitions rarely reviewed and merely tolerated by, but not embraced into the art world of John Reed, its reach into the Australian photographic community was considerable. Exhibitors included Nigel Buesst (Newsreel cameraman and industrial photographer), Keast Burke (Sydney professional and writer on photography, Gordon De Lisle (High-ranking member of the Melbourne Camera Club), Max Dupain, Margaret 'Maggie' Fraser (American advertising photographer), Laurence Le Guay, Zillah Lee, David Moore who was selector and advisor for their shows, Wolfgang Sievers, Marc Strizic, Bob Whitaker, and Brian McArdle, editor of Walkabout.

That this effort at advancing serious photography in Australia was so soon forgotten is due to a number of factors; the practical problems the group faced in putting on their exhibitions, especially the demands and costs of making large prints meant that publicity was a further expensive inconvenience . In Crook's view they "never had the time and resources", and besides, most of the group "had challenging and reasonably enjoyable jobs in science and teaching", and "the ultimate success was to do what seemed right, not that which made us famous". Despite John Crook's archive being lost in the Ash Wednesday bushfires of 1983, a retrospective was able to be mounted at New North Gallery 7–30 October 2010.

== Exhibitions ==
- 1961 Photovision, Museum of Modern Art and Design of Australia in Tavistock Place (Flinders Street), Melbourne.
- Photovision was an annual event between 1959 and 1965.
- 1963, 27 August–7 September, Group M, Urban Woman, Melbourne Town Hall; two hundred photographs, touring to Geelong Art Gallery (1965), The Queen Victoria Museum and Art Gallery (1965) and the Perth Town Hall for the 1966 Festival of Perth, then the Australian Embassy in Mexico during and after the 1968 Olympic Games.
- 1965, 13–30 September, Photovision '65
- 2010, 7–30 October; Group M, New North Gallery, 15a Railway Place Fairfield
