= Gray Smith =

Australian artist and poet (1919–1990)

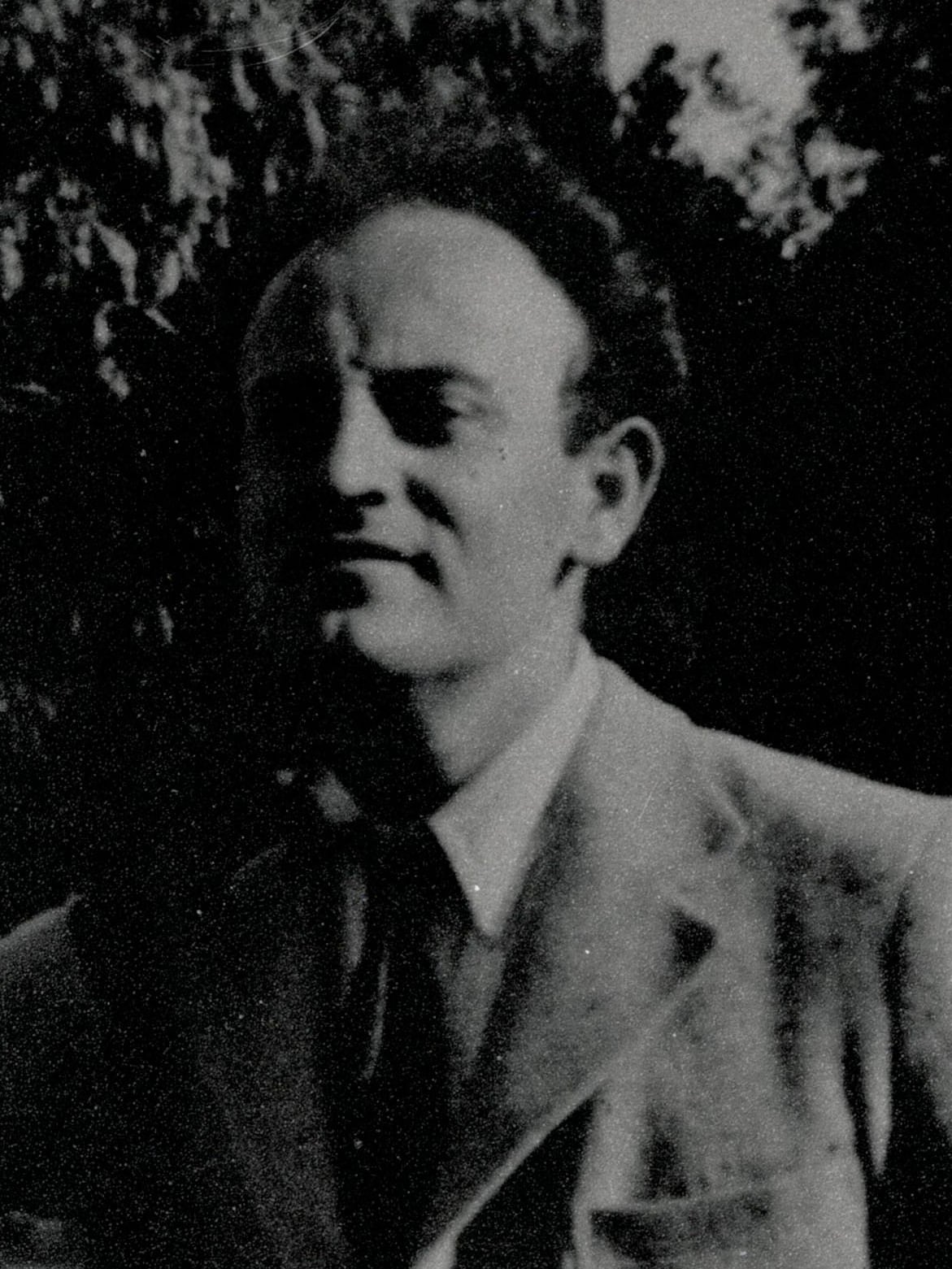
- Gray Smith in 1947
- Born: 13 February 1919; Melbourne, Victoria, Australia
- Died: 7 August 1990 (aged 71); Canberra, ACT, Australia
- Education: Max Meldrum
- Known for: Painting and poetry
- Movement: Angry Penguins

Gray Smith (13 February 1919 – 7 August 1990) was an Australian artist, poet and jeweller who was part of the Heide Circle. While best known as the famous Australian artist Joy Hester's spouse, his most productive artistic period came later while married to Joan Upward in the '60s and '70s. Smith's modernist paintings often featured isolated figures in Australian outback landscapes.

== Biography ==
=== Early life ===
Smith was born in Melbourne, Australia. At 14, he left school to study as an optician and studied art at night. He left Melbourne in 1939 to become a timber cutter in North Drummond, Victoria, sparking a life-long interest in the Australian bush and its folklore.

In 1943 he returned to Melbourne to study with the well-known artist and teacher Max Meldrum and to work in the family picture-framing shop. He married Dorothy Yvonne Egan-Lee in 1944 and had a daughter, Gaie Jocelyn Smith, in 1945.

For his entire life, Smith had epilepsy which stopped him from working steady jobs and slowed his artistic output.

=== Artistic career ===
During the 1940s, Smith joined the artistic group that became known as the Heide Circle, where philanthropists John and Sunday Reed supported artists so they could practice their art unencumbered by paid work.

But even before then, Smith was already acquainted with Sidney Nolan and the Boyds through his older brother Martin Smith, a close friend of Nolan's. He was also a member of the Contemporary Art Society along with Arthur Boyd, Sidney Nolan and John Perceval.

The Reeds also already considered the Smiths (Martin, Gray and their mother Elsie) as extended family. Gray's brother Martin was a picture framer who regularly framed artwork for the Reeds. In addition to Gray's painting, Sunday and John encouraged his poetry. He published his poems in Ern Malley's Journal.

In 1947, Smith fell in love with Joy Hester and eloped to Sydney. While money was tight, this first year together marked an intense and productive period of painting and drawing by both artists.

After about a year, they returned to Melbourne, settling in Hurstbridge, then later moved to Box Hill where they could easier access medical treatment as Hester had Hodgkin lymphoma and Smith continued to struggle with epilepsy. During this time in the country, Smith refined his solitary man in the bush motif drawing on his love of Australian myths and legends. As artist and critic Geoffrey de Groen put it, “Gray Smith's paintings are powerful expressions of the work ethic, and in particular, the man on the land. His paintings heighten the drama of ordinary situations.”

Joy Hester's time with Smith (1947–1960) was her most productive when she produced the acclaimed series Faces, Love, and Sleep. Smith and Hester had two children: Peregrine in 1951 and Fern in 1954. After being together for 12 years, the couple married on 11 November 1959 in Queens Street, Melbourne.

In 1958 John Reed established the Museum of Modern Art Australia and the Reeds donated their artworks as the foundation collection. This set includes 18 Gray Smith paintings.

Smith and Hester lived a balanced life together, practising their art until Joy's death in 1960 from Hodgkin lymphoma.

Gray and Joan Upward (née Davis) began a relationship, bringing their families together in Box Hill, Melbourne. Joan had two sons, Brett and Matthew from her marriage to artist Peter Upward. In November 1961, they all moved to Canberra. Here, Smith began the most prolific period of his artistic career producing over 200 paintings. During this time, Joan did much of the historical research for Gray's artwork, notably the Canberry series. In 1964, Joan and Gray's daughter Sheenagh was born.

The Reeds supported Smith and his family in many ways. For example, in 1958, John Reed sent one of Gray's paintings to the Museum of Modern Art director in New York. John also set up trusts for Gray, Peregrine and Fern and purchased them houses in Melbourne and Canberra. Smith and John Reed corresponded with each other until Reed died, an extraordinary forty years of correspondence.

In 1966, Smith submitted his portrait of Lady 'Molly' Huxley to the Canberra and Goulburn regional round of the Helena Rubinstein Portrait Prize in 1966 and was judged the regional winner and went into the finals.

The French government invited fellow artist John Perceval and Smith to exhibit in Paris in 1967. The plan was to steam to Europe with Joan and their five children. In the end, Perceval was unable to make the trip, and Arthur Wicks took his place, and they exhibited together in Paris.

Smith contributed in many ways to Canberra life. He taught art to locals in his backyard. He helped children with disabilities learn to paint as part of their therapy. He taught at the Canberra Technical College (forerunner to the Canberra School of Art). And in 1971 and '72, Smith was The Canberra Times art critic, writing over 80 critiques of art shows in Canberra.

Smith died in Canberra on 7 August 1990 at his nursing home with his daughter Fern Smith by his side.

== Exhibitions ==
Held 11 solo and eight group exhibitions.

=== Solo exhibitions ===
- 1956: First solo exhibition at Gallery Modern Art Melbourne
- 1958: Solo exhibition Gallery of Contemporary Art – opened by Vance Palmer
- June 1965: ‘The Truth about the Outback’. Gallery A, Canberra.
- 1966: ‘Canberry Paintings – the first 100 years’. Theatre Centre Gallery.
- 20 October 1968: 'Eurimburra Paintings and English Paintings'. Australian Sculpture Gallery.
- 1969: The ANU Arts Society Acquisition exhibition of Gray Smith's paintings Union Building ANU opened by Dr. B. E Kent
- February 1970: Captain Cook Series. Australian Sculpture Gallery.
- 1971: Daisy Bates Series for the ABC broadcasting commission The Daisy Bates series was researched and developed by Professor Tulip
- 1975: Solo exhibition at Solander Galleries arranged by Joan Scott (née Davis)

=== Group exhibitions ===
- 1946–1950, Contemporary Art Society (CAS) Annual Exhibitions in Melbourne
- 12 December 1953 - 20 December 1953. Herald Outdoor Art Show 1953, Treasury Gardens, Melbourne
- 1962, Studio Nundah.
- 1965. 'Sidney Nolan, John Perceval & Gray Smith'. Australian National University.
- 1965. Gallery A. Canberra.
- 23–28 May 1966, Canberra and Goulburn Regional Round for the Helena Rubinstein Portrait Prize (winner), David Jones Department Store, Canberra.
- June 1966, Helena Rubinstein Portrait Prize (finalist), Claude Hotchin Art Gallery, Perth.
- 10–13 May 1967, Paintings by Gray Smith and John Perceval, Residence of Henri Souillac, Cultural Attaché to the French Embassy, Canberra.
- 1968, Deux Aspects de la Peinture Australienne: Gray Smith, Arthur Wicks, Cité Internationale des Arts in association with Qantas Airways, Paris.
- 2001, Joy Hester & Friends. National Gallery of Australia.
- 2024-2026, Always Modern: The Heide Story, Heide Museum of Modern Art.

== Collections ==
- Heide Museum of Modern Art (Melbourne, Victoria)
- National Gallery of Australia (Canberra, ACT)
- University of Canberra (Canberra, ACT)
- Australian National University (Canberra, ACT)

== Publications ==
- Shumack, S., Smith, J. E., & Smith, Gray. (1967). An autobiography : or, Tales and legends of Canberra pioneers / Ed. by J.E. and Samuel Shumack ; [Illus. by Gray Smith] C. Canberra: A.N.U. pr.
- ABC TV Series on Daisy Bates.
- Smith, Gray. "The Hold-Up." Ern Malley’s Journal, vol. 1, no. 1, 1952, p. 17.
- Smith, Gray. "Murder." Ern Malley’s Journal, vol. 2, no. 2, 1955, p. 26.
- Smith, Gray. "Standing." Ern Malley’s Journal, vol. 2, no. 2, 1955, p. 27.
