= Dawn Sime =

Australian artist (1932–2001)

- Born: Dawn Frances Sloggett; 1 June 1932
- Died: 28 May 2001 (aged 68)
- Known for: abstract paintings

Dawn Sime (1 June 1932 – 28 May 2001), who was also known as Dawn Frances Sloggett and Dawn Westbrook, was an abstract painter who was part of the expressionist movement in Melbourne in the late 1950s and 1960s. A pioneer of abstraction at the time, she was among only a few in the field She spent most of her life in Melbourne and died in Castlemaine.

== Education and career ==
As the youngest and only girl in her family, Sime enjoyed reading and drawing and expressed a wish to attend art school at 16 years of age. She was inspired by British modernists such as Henry Moore, Barbara Hepworth, and Ben Nicholson. She was also taken by Asian art, especially after her brother had returned with art prints from a recent South-East Asian tour in the army. Mostly self-taught, she trained formally at the Melbourne Technical College in 1948 for 6 months where she met and eventually married Ian Sime, another aspiring artist.

Together the Simes joined the Contemporary Art Society in the early 1950s. They developed a style of surrealist-based biomorphic abstraction, challenging the popular figurative expressionist painting style of the time as seen in the works of Arthur Boyd, John Perceval, Charles Blackman, and Joy Hester.

Joined by the sculptors Julius Kane and Clifford Last, the Simes exhibited their artworks at Georges and Mirka Mora's studio on Collins Street. Sime also founded with John and Sunday Reed the first artist-run contemporary art space, the Museum of Modern Art Australia, later known as the Heide Museum.

Her works gained recognition once one of her paintings was featured in a major survey of Australian painting held at the Tate Gallery in London in 1962. From then on, she started to sell and exhibit extensively. Her reputation enabled her to become an art teacher at the Fintona Girls' School without having any formal teaching training.

In the early 1960s, her marriage to Ian Sime dissolved which coincided with the waning of her success as an artist. Her success came to halt when she married Erik Westbrook, the director of the National Gallery of Victoria. It was then perceived that her art career could not be taken seriously as the National Gallery of Victoria Director's wife. However, Sime persevered and continued to maintain her art practice and exhibited throughout the 1970s up until the early 1990s. In 1988, she and Westbrook, then retired as NGV director, moved to Castlemaine.

== Exhibitions and residencies ==
- 1960 Gallery 43, Dalgety St, St. Kilda
- 1964, exhibited at Helena Rubinstein by invitation at the Art Gallery of New South Wales
- 1962, she represented Australia at the Tate Gallery in London
- 1972, received a Fellowship to study in the USA
- 1964 and 1973: plexiglass sculptures commissioned
- 1965, exhibited at the South Yarra Gallery
- 1979, exhibited alongside Elizabeth Gower, Jennifer Plunkett, and Isabel Davies at the Powlett St Gallery, Melbourne
- 1987, held an outdoor studio for 2 weeks at the Victoria Gardens in High Street as the Prahan Council's artist-in-residence
- 1995, A l'ombre des jeunes filles et des fleurs: In the shadow of young girls and flowers, group show, Benalla Art Gallery, Benalla, Vic. 10 March – 28 May
- 1996, Looking through: selected works by Dawn Sime, Ian Potter Museum of Art, University of Melbourne, Melbourne, Vic. a retrospective of Sime's works from the 1960s, while her early works were shown at the Heide Museum that same year
- 1992, exhibited at the David Ellis Fine Art Gallery
- 1997, exhibited in a group show at the Museum of Modern Art, Heide alongside Erica Gilchrist and Mirka Mora

== Collections ==
The Women's Art Register artist files highlight her presence in the following gallery collections.

- National Gallery of Victoria
- Art Gallery of Western Australia
- Ballarat Fine Arts Gallery
- Auckland Art Gallery
- Castlemaine Art Museum
- Commonwealth Collection, Canberra
- Reserve Bank, Sydney
- Reserve Bank, NSW

The Register holds 3 slides of Sime's work:

1. Leaf tower, 1970, oil wash on paper, 24" x 36"
2. Notation for asparagus, 1975, photo-montage drawing, 18" x 36"
3. Through a glass darkly, 1976, photo-montage drawing.
