= Richard Woldendorp =

Dutch-Australian photographer (1927–2023)

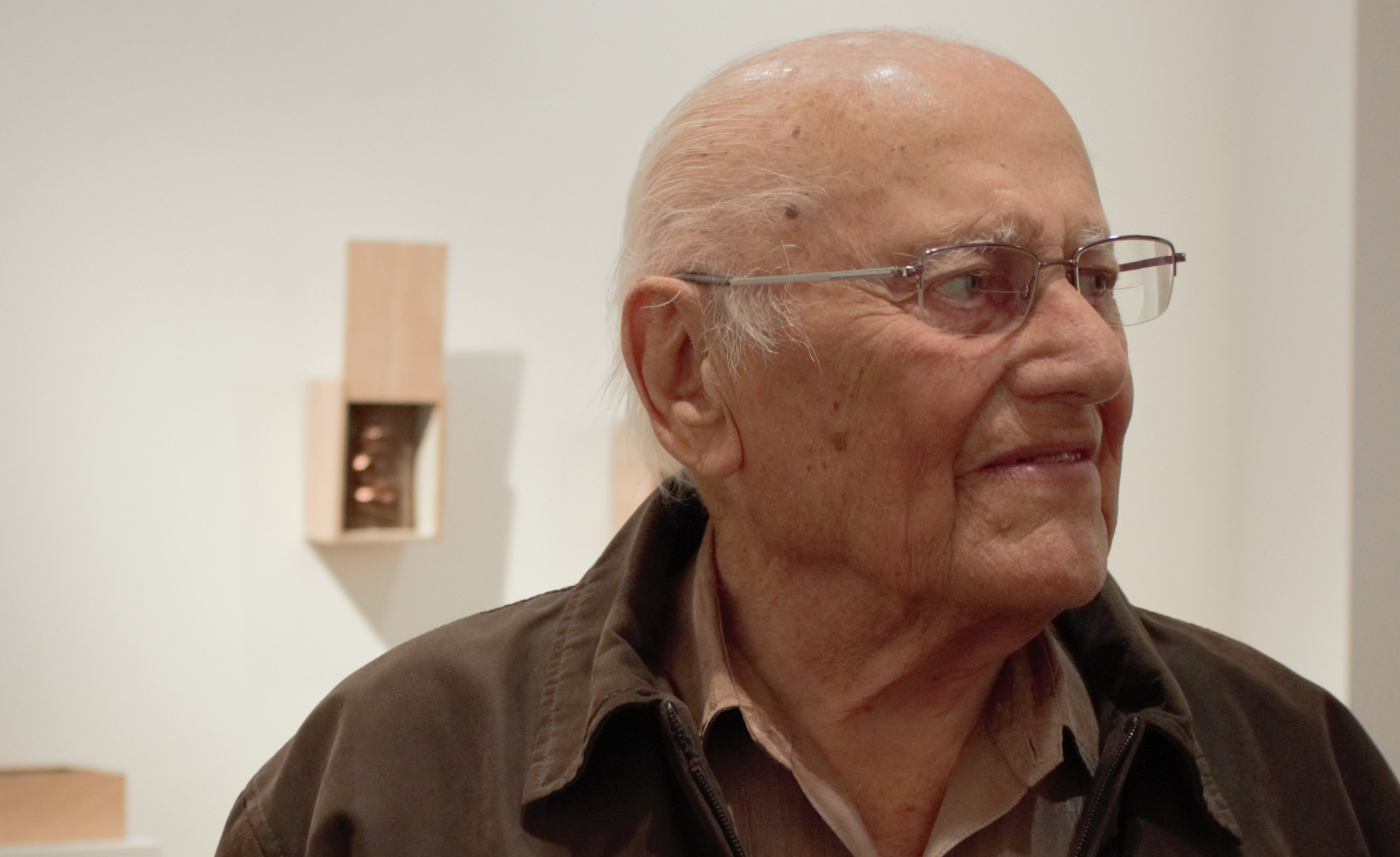

Richard Leo Woldendorp AM (1 January 1927 – April 2023) was a Dutch-Australian photographer known for his aerial photography of Australian geography.

== Early life ==
Born in Utrecht in The Netherlands and brought up by his mother, a sole parent, in Leeuwarden, from 1934 Richard Woldendorp was educated at boarding school in Berkelouw and studied design in his teen years before joining the army at nineteen. He was posted to Indonesia, and after 3 years was presented with the choice of returning to Holland or migrating to Australia, and decided on the latter. On his way to Sydney on 5 January 1951 he stopped in Fremantle, he stayed with a friend's family in Darlington and worked as a house painter, earning enough money to buy land there.

Before a return trip to Holland, traveling via the Suez Canal and then overland through Europe in 1955, Woldendorp bought a folding Voigtländer 6x9cm. Impressed with the creative potential of photography, he visited galleries in Holland to see work of contemporary practitioners Henri Cartier-Bresson and W. Eugene Smith who used 35mm film cameras. Accordingly, in the late 1950s, he too purchased a Leica, but desiring better resolution, traded that for medium-format Pentacon single lens reflex (SLR) and Rolleiflex square format cameras.

== Professional photographer ==
Returning to Perth, Woldendorp joined the Cottesloe Camera Club and in 1961 won 1st and 3rd places in the Craven A National Portrait competition which encouraged him to become professional. Moving to the east coast he networked with other photographers and through his work for Walkabout magazine its editor Brian McArdle introduced him to the association of Australian photographers Group M, which he joined, exhibiting documentary imagery in his first exhibition, the group's Urban Woman of 1963 in Melbourne's Museum of Modern Art Australia, which toured Australian cities including Perth and internationally.

In Sydney Woldendorp met Max Dupain and David Moore whose example encouraged him to show his work to government departments and magazine publishers, before recognising that the largely undocumented cultural landscape of the west and its resources boom were attractive subject matter to them, so returned to WA. Government and other agencies sought his imagery of a vast outback, mining, government programs interacting with indigenous cultures, new infrastructure and attractive housing, to promote Perth and WA for immigration, industry and tourism. With no need of a studio, his contracts with Warnock Sandford Advertising, the Australian Tourist Commission, Australian News and Information Bureau and other Government bodies, his freelance work satisfied his love of travel and provided a living selling also to magazines The Bulletin, Walkabout, Australian Women's Weekly Vogue, government journals and many newspapers and RealTime.

== Aerial photography ==
As he took the opportunity to make photographs during long-distance travel by plane over Western Australia for assignments, Woldendorp became especially known for his semi-abstract aerial colour photography, which he exhibited as a professional artist in his first solo exhibition at David Foulkes Taylor's Triangle gallery in the Perth suburb of Crawley in 1964 and in a collaboration with bird photographer Peter Slater, published his first book The Hidden Face of Australia in 1968. He followed it with A Million Square (1969) in partnership with writer Tom T.A.G. Hungerford. He returned to Indonesia, reviving his earlier familiarity with the country and its people and published Indonesia in 1972. Subsequently, he has produced over twenty books on land, industry and people.

In 1979 Woldendorp and his wife Lyn established the first picture agency in Western Australia; Photo Index, a success which over twenty years provided freedom to travel and to make work with artistic integrity.

In 2007, Woldendorp's imagery was used for projections onto performers' bodies in Aureo's Skadada, directed by Katie Lavers, at His Majesty's Theatre, Perth, 17–20 January.

== Recognition ==
Woldendorp was made a Fellow of the Australian Institute of Professional Photography in 1991, and an Honorary Life Member in 1997.

In 2004 he was made a State Living Treasure of Western Australia for his contribution to the arts, and in 2012 he was recognised "for services to the arts as a landscape photographer" and made a Member of the Order of Australia.

His work was celebrated in a retrospective in the Western Australian Art gallery in 2009, and another, Woldendorp: A Black and White Retrospective at Mundaring Arts Centre, in 2018.

== Death ==
Woldendorp died in April 2023.

== Publications ==
- (1969) Hungerford, T. A. G. and Richard Woldendorp A million square : Western Australia . Melbourne: Thomas Nelson (Australia). ISBN 0-17-001823-7
- (1983) Australia's West Perth, W.A Day Dawn Press. ISBN 0-9596934-1-6
- (1985) Australia, the Untamed Land photographs by Richard Woldendorp. Sydney: Reader's Digest. ISBN 0-949819-61-1
- (1986) Scott, John (1986). Landscapes of Western Australia. Claremont: Aeolian Press. (text by John Scott, photographs by Richard Woldendorp)
- (1992) Journey through a landscape : Richard Woldendorp's Australia. West Perth, W.A : Sandpiper Press. ISBN 0-646-09386-X
- (1994) Australia's flying doctors: the Royal Flying Doctor Service of Australia photographs by Richard Woldendorp; text by Roger McDonald. Chippendale, N.S.W. : Pan Macmillan ISBN 0-7329-0793-4
- (1995) Australia, the untamed land photographs by Richard Woldendorp. Sydney : Reader's Digest. ISBN 0-86438-933-7
- (1999) Down to Earth: Australian Landscapes. North Fremantle, Fremantle Arts Centre Press in association with Sandpiper Press (text by Tim Winton)
- (2001) Design by nature photographs by Richard Woldendorp; text by Victoria Laurie. North Fremantle, W.A. : Fremantle Arts Centre Press in association with Sandpiper Press, ISBN 1-86368-349-6
- (2003) Woldendorp, Richard (2003). Wool: the Australian story. Fremantle: Fremantle Arts Centre Press. ISBN 1-86368-396-8. (with text by Roger McDonald and Amanda Burton)
