= Down to Earth: Australian Landscapes =

1999 book by Richard Woldendorp and Tim Winton

- Author: Richard Woldendorp; Tim Winton
- Language: English
- Genre: Non-fiction
- Publication date: 1999

Down to Earth: Australian Landscapes is a non-fiction book by photographer Richard Woldendorp with an essay by multi-award winning Australian author Tim Winton originally published in 1999. The book is a collection of photographs of the Australian landscape, with an accompanying essay by Winton that examines his personal responses to the land.

== Authors ==
Richard Woldendorp has lived in Australia since 1951. He was named Australian Photographer of the Year in 1982 for his landscape photography, and is a prolific landscape photographer with a large portfolio of published books. He was made an Honorary Life Member of the Australian Institute of Professional Photography in 1988.

Tim Winton was born in Western Australia and resides there. He is a multi-award winning author. Winton is a keen supporter of environmental causes and won the first ASA Medal in recognition of his contribution to saving Ningaloo Reef in Western Australia. Winton commented on his collaborations with photographers saying he was approached by photographers who possibly saw " ... visual elements in my work which they thought would work with their images."

In March 2017 Tim Winton was named Patron of the newly established Native Australian Animals Trust. The environment and the Australian landscape have always featured strongly in Wintons writings. The trust was established to help research and teaching about native animals and their environment.

== Reviews ==
A review in Better World Books commented that, "This book contains a stunning array of color photographs by renowned photographer Richard Woldendorp accompanied by a substantial and deeply personal essay on landscape by award winning writer Tim Winton - offering two unique views of the Australian landscape."

Shortlisted at the 2000 Western Australian Premier's Book Awards the judging panel commented that, "... acclaimed photographer Richard Woldendorp has produced a stunning album of aerial pictures of the Australian landscape in which his professional skill and artistry, as well as his love of his subject shine through" and that Tim Winton "brings his own insights and passions to the subject."

Ric Spencer writes of Wolderdorp's work, "I think he understands the need for us to belong in this landscape, but equally the feeling that we don't."

== Holdings ==
Down to Earth: Australian Landscapes is held by various libraries but also by a number of notable institutions, including the Art Gallery of New South Wales. Edmund and Joanna Capon Research Library and Archive, Australian Film, Television and Radio School. Jerzy Toeplitz Library, National Gallery of Australia. National Gallery of Australia Research Library, National Museum of Australia. National Museum of Australia Research Library and Queensland Art Gallery. QAGOMA Research Library and multiple University Libraries in most Australian states.
