= History of the Royal Melbourne Institute of Technology =

The Royal Melbourne Institute of Technology (RMIT) is an Australian public university, founded by Francis Ormond MLA in 1887, in Melbourne, Victoria, Australia.

== The Working Men's College ==
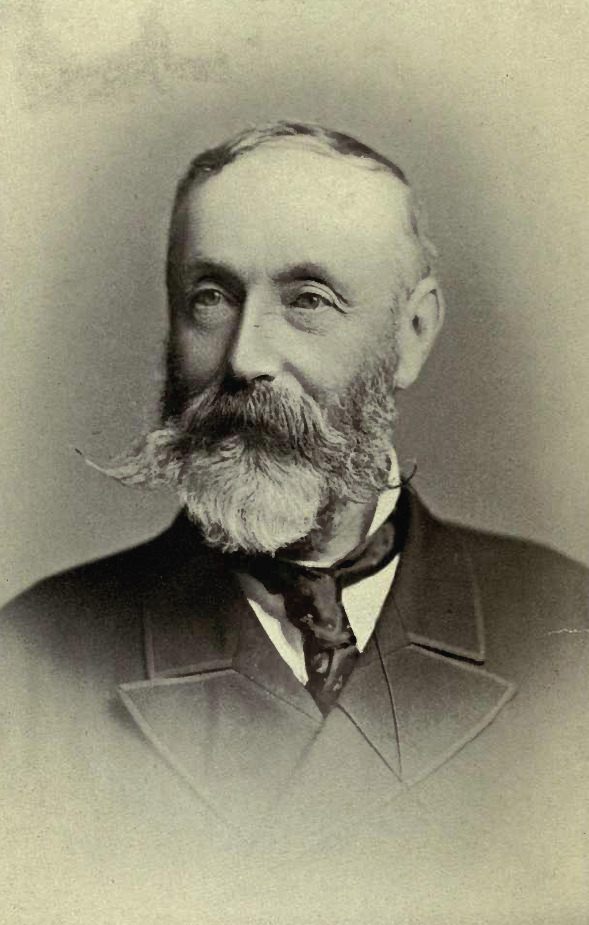
RMIT founder, Francis Ormond

In 1881, prominent grazier and philanthropist, Francis Ormond, proposed that a technical college would serve "useful" to City of Melbourne. Ormond, who had donated the majority of funds towards the foundation of Ormond College at the University of Melbourne, offered £5,000 towards the establishment of a college on the proviso that the public contribute a "like sum".

A considerable sum was raised by the Council of the Melbourne Trades Hall, which rallied support amongst its membership of unions. Construction of the "Working Men's College" then began in 1886, on a site provided by the Colony of Victoria, next to the Melbourne Magistrates' Court, and adjacent the Melbourne Public Library on La Trobe Street. The College was officially opened during a gala ceremony on 4 June 1887 and, on the night of its opening, took 320 enrollments which increased to over 1000 in its first 12 months of operation. Ormond, a staunch believer in the values of education and a tireless campaigner for the College, served as its President until his death in 1889.

The College began offering full-time courses in 1899 and was incorporated under the "Companies Act" as a private college in 1904. Around the turn of the century, it began developing courses in engineering, applied science, chemistry, metallurgy and mining. Between the 1900s and the 1920s, the College expanded beyond its foundation building, and constructed two new buildings on nearby Bowen Street, a new Art School and also acquired the neighbouring, and recently decommissioned, Melbourne Gaol site for expansion.

During the 1930s, the College underwent further expansion with the completion of an Engineering School and a Radio School, and two more buildings constructed on Bowen Street. In 1934, the College officially changed its name to the "Melbourne Technical College" (incorporating The Working Men's College), after a representation from its Student's Association.

== Legend of Ned Kelly's remains ==
After the closure and partial demolishment of the nearby Old Melbourne Gaol, during the 1920s, the College acquired the site for future expansion. In 1929, the remains of Australia's most notorious bushranger, Ned Kelly (who was hanged at the gaol), were believed to have been discovered during the construction of the Kernot Engineering School. These remains were later reinterred Pentridge Prison, and rediscovered in 2008. However, no conclusive evidence of the remains suggest they are that of Ned Kelly's, and many historians believe his remains are still buried under the present day RMIT.

== Contribution to WWI and WWII ==
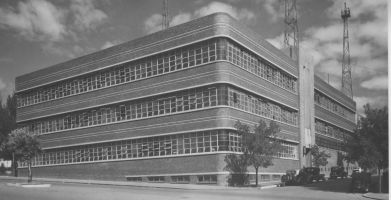
Radio Communication Building in 1950

The College contributed to Australia's war efforts both in World War I and in World War II. Initially, between 1917 and 1919, it trained over 1500 returned Anzac service men from World War I in vocational qualifications for post-war life in Australia. Between 1939 and 1945, during World War II, it made a greater contribution to Australia's war efforts by training 23,000 service men and women (approximately one-sixth of all trained in Australia), mainly Royal Australian Air Force personnel in radio communications, as well as 2,000 civilians in munitions manufacturing. The Government of Australia also commissioned the College to manufacture parts for the Air Force's DAP Beaufort Bomber.

After World War II, and during the 1950s, the College again trained returned service men and women for post-war life, which prompted the development of courses in food technology, transport studies, accountancy and advertising, and the revision of its art syllabuses. During this time, the College also embraced the Commonwealth of Nations' newly devised Colombo Plan, which increased its intake of South East Asian students greatly.

== Royal patronage and birth of RMIT ==
In 1954, the College was awarded royal patronage by Queen Elizabeth II - for its service to the Commonwealth in the area of education and for its contribution to the war effort; and was officially renamed the "Royal Melbourne Technical College". It became (and remains to this day) the only higher education institution in Australia with the right of the prefix "Royal" along with the use of the Monarchy of England's regalia.

In 1960, the Council of the College voted to begin the process of reconstituting the college as a tertiary institution. The name of the College was then officially changed to the "Royal Melbourne Institute of Technology".

During the late 1950s and 1960s, the non-tertiary branch of RMIT was reconstituted as the "Technical College" (TAFE), and it was believed the Institute and the College would eventually separate. However, the two have remained as incorporated branches of RMIT to the present day. During the 1960s, RMIT's Art School established its reputations as an Australian leader in its field.

In the 1970s and early 1980s, the Institute expanded its degrees in business and engineering, and the College expanded its courses in technology and general studies. In 1979, the neighbouring Emily McPherson College of Domestic Economy on Russell Street amalgamated with RMIT, bringing with it its reputation in fashion design and food technology. RMIT's Aeronautics School also established its reputation as an Australian leader in its field, during the late 1970s.

RMIT celebrated its centenary in 1987 with a year-long calendar of events staged across the City of Melbourne, a time capsule set in the Bowen Street courtyard of the foundation building of the Working Men's College on La Trobe Street and a book called "The Tech: A Centenary History of the Royal Melbourne Institute of Technology", documenting the institute's 100 years of history, was also published.

In 1992, RMIT was granted public university status by the Parliament of Victoria under the "Royal Melbourne Institute of Technology Act". RMIT's newly appointed Chancellery officially adopted the names "RMIT University" for its Institute branch and "RMIT TAFE" for its College branch, during the early 1990s, and its Design School also established its reputation as an international leader in eco-friendly design.

== Expansion for the 21st Century ==
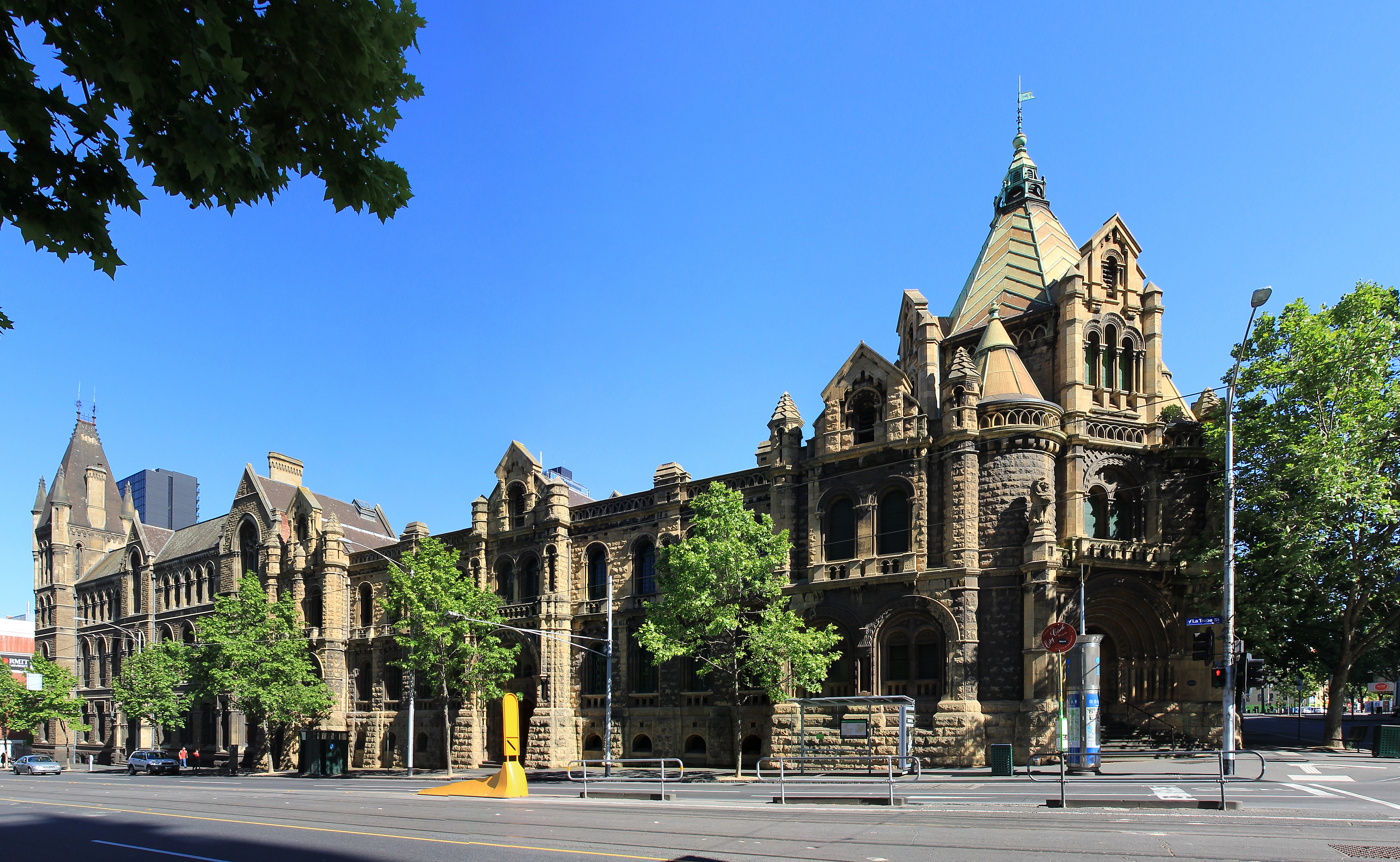
The historic former Melbourne Magistrates' Court was acquired by RMIT in 1995

Following its reconstitution as a public university, RMIT then underwent a large and rapid expansion where a number of other institutes and colleges became amalgamated with it, between 1993 and 1999, which included: Phillip Institute of Technology, Melbourne College of Decoration and Design, Melbourne College of Printing and Graphic Art and Melbourne Institute of Textiles.

In 1995, RMIT acquired the neighbouring, and recently vacated, former Melbourne Magistrates' Court and City Watch House buildings on the corner of La Trobe and Russell streets, and renamed its expanding campus in Melbourne the City campus. It also established a new environmentally sustainable "country campus" around 20 km from the City campus, in Bundoora, which opened in 1995.

In 1999, it acquired the derelict state heritage-listed Capitol Theatre in the Melbourne central business district, and refurbished it to its original design. It also established a specialised fashion and printing campus in Brunswick, on the site of the former Melbourne Institute of Textiles in 1999, and became a founding member of the Australian Technology Network, a coalition of leading Australian universities working with industry.

At the turn of the century, RMIT was invited by the Government of Vietnam to establish Vietnam's first foreign-owned university. In 2001, it established "RMIT International University, Vietnam" (now RMIT University Vietnam) near the centre of Ho Chi Minh City, and a second campus in the Vietnamese capital city of Hanoi in 2004. In its years of operation, the Government of Vietnam has awarded RMIT University Vietnam five Golden Dragon Awards for Education.

During the mid-2000s, RMIT experienced financial problems, partly due to problems associated with its student administration system upgrade (A$47 million was spent in this effort). The financial problems eventually claimed the then Vice-Chancellor, Prof. Ruth Dunkin. In 2005, RMIT appointed a new Vice-Chancellor, Margaret Gardner and, between 2006 and 2007, posted operating profits of A$50.1 million and then A$109.5 million each year respectively. In 2006, it also became a founding member of the Global U8 Consortium.
