= William Rose =

William Rose may refer to:

== Sports ==
- William Rose (cricketer, born 1842) (1842–1917), English cricketer
- William Rose (footballer) (1861–1937), England international footballer
- Billy Rose (footballer, born 1904) (1904-1982), English footballer, see List of Bury F.C. players (1–24 appearances)
- Billy Rose (curler) (1904–1987), Canadian curler
- Bill Rose (footballer) (1931–2007), Australian rules footballer
- William Rose (cricketer, born 1934) (1934–2025), English cricketer
- Bill Rose (swim coach) (born 1943), American swimming coach
- Willie Rose (William Rose, born 1987), American football fullback

== Politicians ==
- William Rose I (fl. 1393–1406), MP for Weymouth
- William Rose (MP for Canterbury) (before 1410–after 1443), MP for Canterbury
- William Oliver Rose (1871–1936), physician and politician in British Columbia, Canada
- William Stewart Rose (1775–1843), poet, translator, Treasurer of the Navy, Member of Parliament
- Sir William Rose (Clerk of the Parliaments) (1803-1885), clerk of the Parliaments
- William Anderson Rose (1820–1881), businessman, MP and Lord Mayor of London
- William G. Rose (1829–1899), Republican mayor of Cleveland, Ohio
- William Edward Rose, American hotelier, railroad president and politician in South Carolina
- William Pinckney Rose (1787–1850), American soldier and participant in the Mississippi Constitutional Convention of 1832.

== Others ==
- William Rose (schoolmaster and writer) (1719–1786), Scottish schoolmaster and classical scholar
- William Cumming Rose (1887–1985), American nutritionist
- William Rose (illustrator) (1909–1972), American film poster illustrator
- William Rose (screenwriter) (1914–1987), American screenwriter
- Axl Rose (William Rose, born 1962), Guns N' Roses vocalist
- William I. Rose (geologist), American mineralogist
- William I. Rose (United States Army officer) (1898–1954), American military officer
- Sir William Rose, 2nd Baronet (1846–1902), owner in Victorian times of Moor Park, Farnham
- William Kinnaird Rose (1845–1919), editor of the Brisbane Courier
- William John Rose (1885–1968), Canadian Slavist and historian
- Billy Rose (1899–1966), American theatrical showman
- William Balthazar Rose (born 1961), British painter
