= Eric Westbrook =

British-born Australian artist, curator and gallery director

Dr Eric Westbrook CB (29 September 1915 – 2005) was a British-born Australian artist, curator and gallery director of Auckland Art Gallery and the National Gallery of Victoria.

== Early life and education ==
Eric Westbrook was born in Peckham, south-east London on 29 September 1915. In childhood, he accompanied is father, a businessman in the textile industry, on his travels in Europe and waiting for him in museums, an experience which made a lasting impression on his love of art and of galleries.

He was taught by Walter Sickert and Mark Gertler in painting courses at art schools including Battersea, Clapham and Westminster School of Art, and supported his studies by working as a telephone operator. Despite being scholarship winner, he decided he could make a better contribution as a connoisseur than as a painter, and went to Paris in 1934, at age nineteen, to tour its galleries and to see contemporary art.

During World War II, and after graduating from art school, he was rejected for service in the infantry on the grounds of 'puniness' and instead worked in intelligence liaison and army education. In 1944 he met his first wife, domestic science teacher Ingrid Nystrom, in an air-raid shelter. He took up art teaching after the war for the London County Council before being appointed art master at Ardingly College, Sussex. This led to work for the Arts Council of Great Britain as one of four guide lecturers touring Britain with art exhibitions, and in another role he set up art education for the army and advised the YMCA Youth Clubs in Britain.

== Curatorship ==
Westbrook was approached by the retiring director of the Wakefield Art Gallery (est. 1934, and since 2011 named The Hepworth Wakefield) in West Yorkshire in 1946 to apply for the position. Successful, he became Britain’s youngest gallery director. During his tenure he organised a retrospective of the work of Henry Moore who was born 60 km from Wakefield. The exhibition attracted controversial attention when president of the Royal Academy of Arts Alfred Munnings in his 1949 radio-broadcast valedictory speech in 1949 attacked Modernism, identifying Moore as an offending artist. The material Westbrook generated for the show was taken up for a British Council European tour of Moore's work. This led three years later to Westbrook being invited to join the Fine Arts Department of the British Council as chief exhibitions officer, arranging traveling exhibitions on British to most European countries, and twice in charge of the British pavilion at the Venice Biennale. While in Greece during one of these tours, he was informed that Auckland City Art Gallery was seeking a new director. In 1952 he successfully applied and flew back to England through America to visit galleries there.

For the next four and a half years as director at Auckland he was innovative in exhibitions and expanding activities of the gallery in other arts by inaugurating poetry readings, concerts and summer schools, lecturing and broadcaster. In recognition, the Art Galleries and Museums Association of New Zealand appointed him an honorary life member in 1959.

Westbrook oversaw an 'unusual exhibition' in July 1952, where drawings for the top 16 entrants in the Sea Spray magazine 20' LWL fast cruising yacht design international competition were displayed in the gallery.

== National Gallery of Victoria ==
In 1955 with Daryl Lindsay’s impending retirement as director of the National Gallery of Victoria, Westbrook was invited to apply for the position and he was appointed on 1 January 1956, aged forty-one years, on a salary of £1,868 p.a. (A$287,800.00 at 2025 value). Negotiating with a new Victorian Government, he worked to restructure the gallery and increase staffing, raising the profile of the Gallery through his lectures and on the media. He supported the establishment in 1957 of the Victorian Public Galleries Group (later named Regional Galleries Association of Victoria).

A period of travel in Europe 1957 enabled Westbrook to inspect museums in the Soviet Union and elsewhere, following which in 1960 he and architect Roy Grounds toured 122 galleries and museums and other cultural buildings in Europe and America, as they planned for the removal of the gallery from Melbourne’s public library to a new complex at Southbank and St Kilda Road and the development there of an Arts Centre. Study leave on a Carnegie Fellowship in 1965 led him in 1967 to establish the NGV voluntary guide service as an interactive and friendly means of introducing audiences to art in institutions which they may find daunting. In a 1965 interview for a Walkabout magazine profile, he asserted an aim to make art and all forms of culture more accessible.

In 1968 construction of the new building for the National Gallery of Victoria was completed, though the design, met with the disapproval of some commentators, including art patron John Reed of the Museum of Modern Art Australia, who ridiculed it as "an unmitigated disaster." The process was commemorated by Westbrook in Birth of a Gallery which incorporates a transcript of conversations between the director and architect Grounds. The first exhibition in the new building, The Field, is still regarded as historic and influential for breaking with nationalistic Modernist Australian art to represent emerging artists working in challenging international styles. He proposed in a 1962 interview that the Centre in St Kilda Road would provide "information, stimulation and relaxation for citizens" and that from it a huge creative effort by artists would result in a building designed for its best display, adding that "...it's an ‘instrument’ which we are learning to play," his role being like that of an orchestral conductor.

In 1970 he was appointed president of UNESCO Visual Arts Committee, but his directorship sometimes met with controversy; he was instrumental in the Gallery becoming the first in Australia to have a photography department, eventually with its own curator Jennie Boddington; in 1973 Westbrook mounted a large retrospective of work by socialist artist Noel Counihan to criticism from the staff and trustees on grounds that it either was insufficiently 'modern' or that its subversive nature might bring the gallery into disrepute, but Professor (Sir) Joseph Burke's support in opening the exhibition carried weight with most trustees, leading to Counihan's acceptance as a major Australian artist; and an exhibition of Leonard French, who was then Westbrook's exhibitions officer met the disapproval of Professor Bernard Smith and his Antipodeans.

== Late career ==
Westbrook retired from the National Gallery of Victoria in 1975 and until 1980 he headed the Victorian Ministry for the Arts, moving then with his second wife non-objective painter Dawn Sime to Castlemaine. There he resumed his practice as an artist and supported the Castlemaine Art Gallery and Museum for which he had formerly provided advice on building its collections while in his role of Director at the NGV.

== Awards ==
- 1974: Honorary Doctorate of Laws, Monash University
- 1974: Chevalier of the Order of Arts and Letters
- 1981: Companion of the Order of the Bath
- 1981: Ordre des Palmes Académiques

== Publications ==
- Sime, Dawn; Westbrook, Eric; Charles Nodrum Gallery (2007), Dawn Sime & Eric Westbrook, Charles Nodrum Gallery
- Westbrook, Eric; Victoria. Council of Adult Education; National Gallery of Victoria (1960), The Australian vision, National Gallery of Victoria
- Duldig, Karl; Ruskin, Pamela (1966), Karl Dulding sculpture : Vienna, Singapore, Melbourne, Cheshire
- Westbrook, Eric; National Gallery of Victoria (1990), The Sistine Chapel : a photographic exploration, [National Gallery of Victoria?]
- Westbrook, Eric; Quality of life (1970 : Sherbrooke, Vic.); Westbrook, Eric (1970), The quality of life : papers delivered at a conference, November 28-29th, 1970, YUNA-CIVIS, [YUNA-CIVIS]
- Westbrook, Eric; National Gallery of Victoria (1961), 6 Australian painters, National Gallery of Victoria
- International Community Education Conference (3rd : 1979 : Melbourne, Vic.); Victoria. Ministry for the Arts (1979), Artists catalogue, Victorian Ministry for the Arts
- Sellbach, Udo; Dodds, Peter; Council of Adult Education; Education Dept; National Gallery of Victoria (1967), Printmakers, [National Gallery of Victoria
- Philip Morris Arts Grant; Westbrook, Eric; Mollison, James, 1931-; Philip Morris (Australia) Arts Grant (1974), The Philip Morris Arts Grant First Annual Exhibition : 1974, Philip Morris (Australia)]
- National Gallery of Victoria; Cogniat, Raymond; Kunstler, Charles (1971), Pierre Bonnard, 1867-1947, National Gallery of Victoria
- Westbrook, Eric; Brown, Albert; National Gallery of Victoria; Westbrook, Eric; Brown, Albert (1968), The perceptive eye representing five photographers from Kodak Collection, [National Gallery of Victoria]
- Williams, Fred; McClelland Gallery (1975), The etchings of Fred Williams at the McClelland Gallery, McClelland Gallery
- National Gallery of Victoria; Westbrook, Eric; Heathcote, Christopher, 1959- (2000), 1956 Melbourne, National Gallery of Victoria
- Murray-Smith, Stephen, 1922-1988; Turner, Ian, 1922-1978 (1979), Overland 76/77 : Ian Turner memorial number, Stephen Murray-Smith
