= Donald Laycock (artist) =

Australian artist

- Born: Donald Gordon Laycock; 4 April 1931 (age 95); Melbourne, Australia
- Education: National Gallery of Victoria Art School
- Known for: Painting
- Style: FigurativeAbstract expressionism

Donald Gordon Laycock (born 4 April 1931) is an Australian artist. He is a painter and is best known as the creator of the interior paintings of Hamer Hall in Melbourne, Australia. Bernard Smith called Laycock, one of the first, "if not the first", Australian abstract expressionist painter.

== Life and work ==
He attended the National Gallery of Victoria Art School, graduating in 1953. Laycock's works are held in the collection of the National Gallery of Victoria, Art Centre Melbourne and Art Gallery of New South Wales. He was colleagues with Lawrence Daws, Clifton Pugh and John Howley.

== Notable works ==
- Interiors of Hamer Hall, Melbourne, Australia
