= McGlashan Everist =

Australian architectural firm

Practice information
- Firm type: Partnership
- Founders: David McGlashan (1927–1998); Neil Everist (1929–2016)
- Founded: 1955; 71 years ago
- Location: Melbourne, Victoria, Australia

Significant works and honors
- Buildings: Grimwade House, Rye; Heide II
- Awards: Victorian Architecture Medal, 1963 and 1968

Website
- pmdl-mea.com.au (as PMDL-McGlashan Everist)

McGlashan Everist is an Australian architectural practice founded in Melbourne in 1955 by David McGlashan and Neil Everist. Their designs are characterised by low-spread houses with flat roofs and walls of tall, timber framed windows. Although their last project under the founders was completed in 1976, the firm continued to flourish in the educational sector and merged with a larger international practice in 2022, and is now known as PMDL-McGlashan Everist (PMDL-MEA). The firm continues to offer architectural and planning services in Geelong and throughout Australia.

== History ==
David McGlashan (1927–1998) and Neil Everist (1929–2016) met while studying architecture at the University of Melbourne and formed the architectural firm McGlashan and Everist in 1955 in Melbourne. The company commenced with residential commissions before turning to commercial building designs in the late 1960s. McGlashan and Everist received numerous accolades for their innovative design, and in 1963 were awarded the Victorian Architecture Medal for Grimwade House, and in 1968, the Bronze Medal of the Victorian Chapter 'for outstanding Architecture,’ for the design of Heide II. The last house the two original partners completed was the Mylius House II in 1976."

== Design ==
Typifying their designs were low-spread houses with flat roofs, which they would step down sloping sites, and walls of tall, timber-framed windows that did not open. Instead, ventilation was provided through flywire screens and glazed doors throughout, and narrow, glazed clerestories (strips of sliding glass between the beams, just below the ceiling). The light-filled living areas were open plan, with few partitions, hallways or passages. Outside, overhanging, timber-battened eaves and pergolas, provided shade during summer. Influenced by international design ideas, McGlashan and Everist believed in the importance of connecting site and architecture, and aimed to create houses specifically for the Australian landscape.

"We tried to design houses that were without a time scale."

— Neil Everist, 2008

== Significant projects ==
=== Grimwade House ===
Listed on the Victorian Heritage Register, Grimwade House was designed by McGlashan and Everist and constructed in 1961–62 for Geoffrey Holt Grimwade (1902–1961), his wife and their four daughters. It was built as a retirement home that could also serve as a holiday house, on a large block of land at Rye, surrounded by natural bush of melaleucas and casuarinas. It is located on a sandy ridge 500 metres (1,600 ft) from Port Phillip.

The house, designed in the Modernist pavilion style, on a three-metre (ten-foot) module, comprises five flat-roofed pavilions, linked by covered ways, which create a variety of sheltered outdoor courtyards between the wings. The main house forms an L-shape, consisting of bedrooms and living area connected by a large north-east facing terrace.

Sliding doors and screens that allow spaces to change and adjust according to the weather or the needs of family life and the connection of the indoor and outdoor spaces are reminiscent of traditional Japanese residential architecture. The floors are terracotta tile, the walls are clad in western red cedar and the ceiling is a cream coloured vermiculite, to help with the acoustics of a predominantly tiled space. Limestone, quarried on the site, is used for external, and one internal wall. David McGlashan also designed a large part of the original furniture including tables, benches and sofas.

The Grimwade House was published in Architecture in Australia in 1964, following the awarding of the Victorian Architecture Medal in 1963 in the same year. Geoffrey Grimwade's untimely death in 1961 prevented the house becoming his retirement home, and was subsequently owned by the Grimwade family.

=== Heide II, Museum of Modern Art ===
Originally Heide House designed by David McGlashan, commissioned in 1963 by John and Sunday Reed. Now stands as an exhibition space of the Heide Museum of Modern Art. "The Reed’s brief to McGlashan specified that Heide be invested with a sense of romance and agelessness; to have the mysteriousness of a ruin but function as 'a gallery to be lived in'." David McGlashan designed Heide with art in mind. The site itself is steeped in the art history of Australia, situated by the Yarra River, a favoured location of Heidelberg School painters from the late 19th century. "the resultant building successfully accommodates the clients engagement with both art sheltered within and the evocative natural setting beyond its walls."

McGlashan approached his design as a work of abstract art, 'dynamically arrayed walls served to connect inside and outside.' Through these techniques McGlashan "offered a distinct spatial interpretation of the Reed’s more general desire, expressed in the brief, for internal walls 'extending into the garden' " . McGlashan designed a home where the physical experience of moving through the space portrays a direct relationship between the house, the site and the art. Techniques of framing, obscuring and directing your experience through his design speak to all these elements.

"When looking at these works, the walls keep the landscape out of sight. Glare is removed, but the precision with which McGlashan overlaps the walls suggests that he was not merely solving a functional problem but also establishing a separation between the realms of nature on the one hand and art and architecture on the other."

Upon completion in 1967 Heide was awarded the RAIA Bronze Medal for the Best Building in all categories for Victoria in 1968. Heide has been described as "Australia’s pre-eminent example of International modernism" .

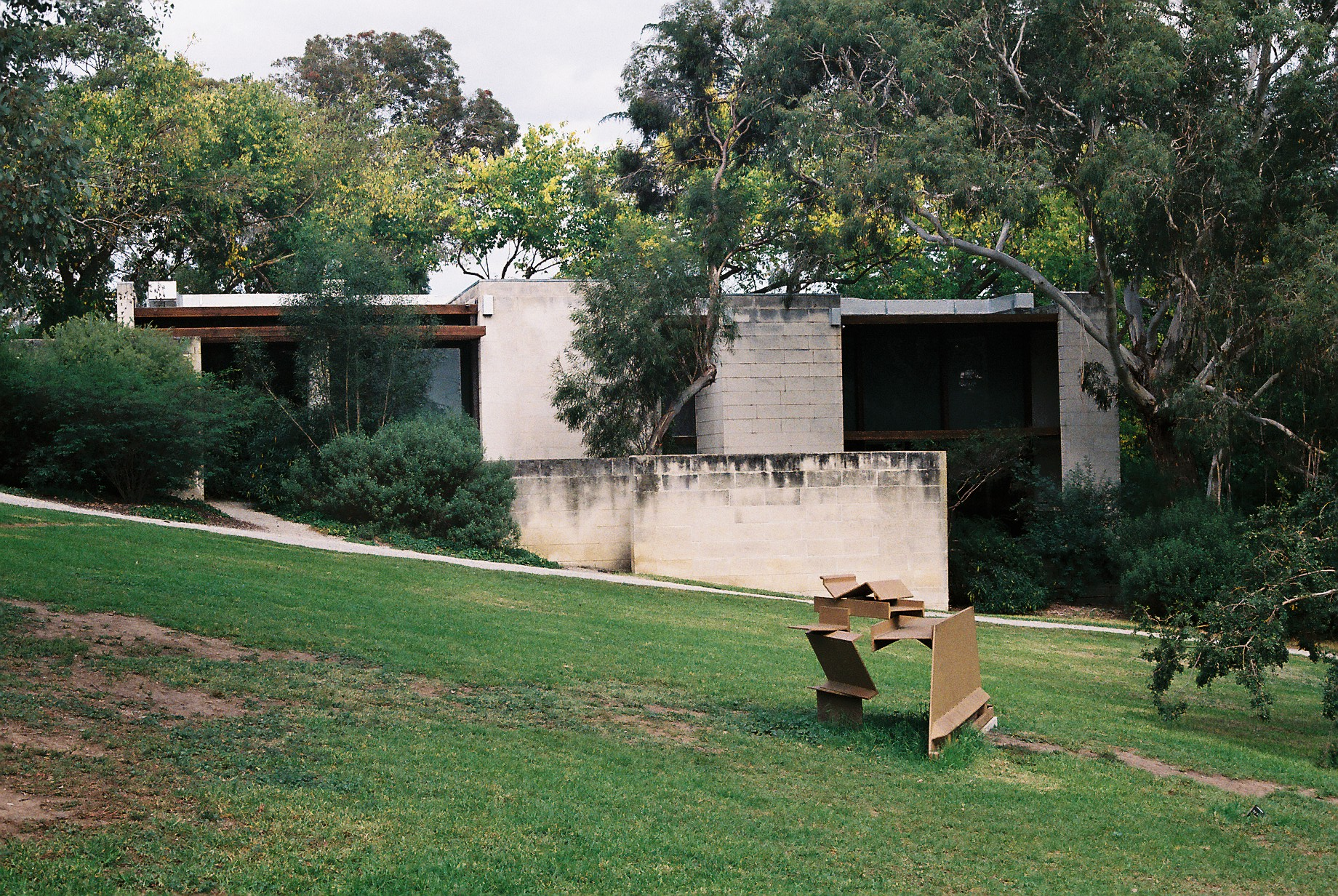
Heide II

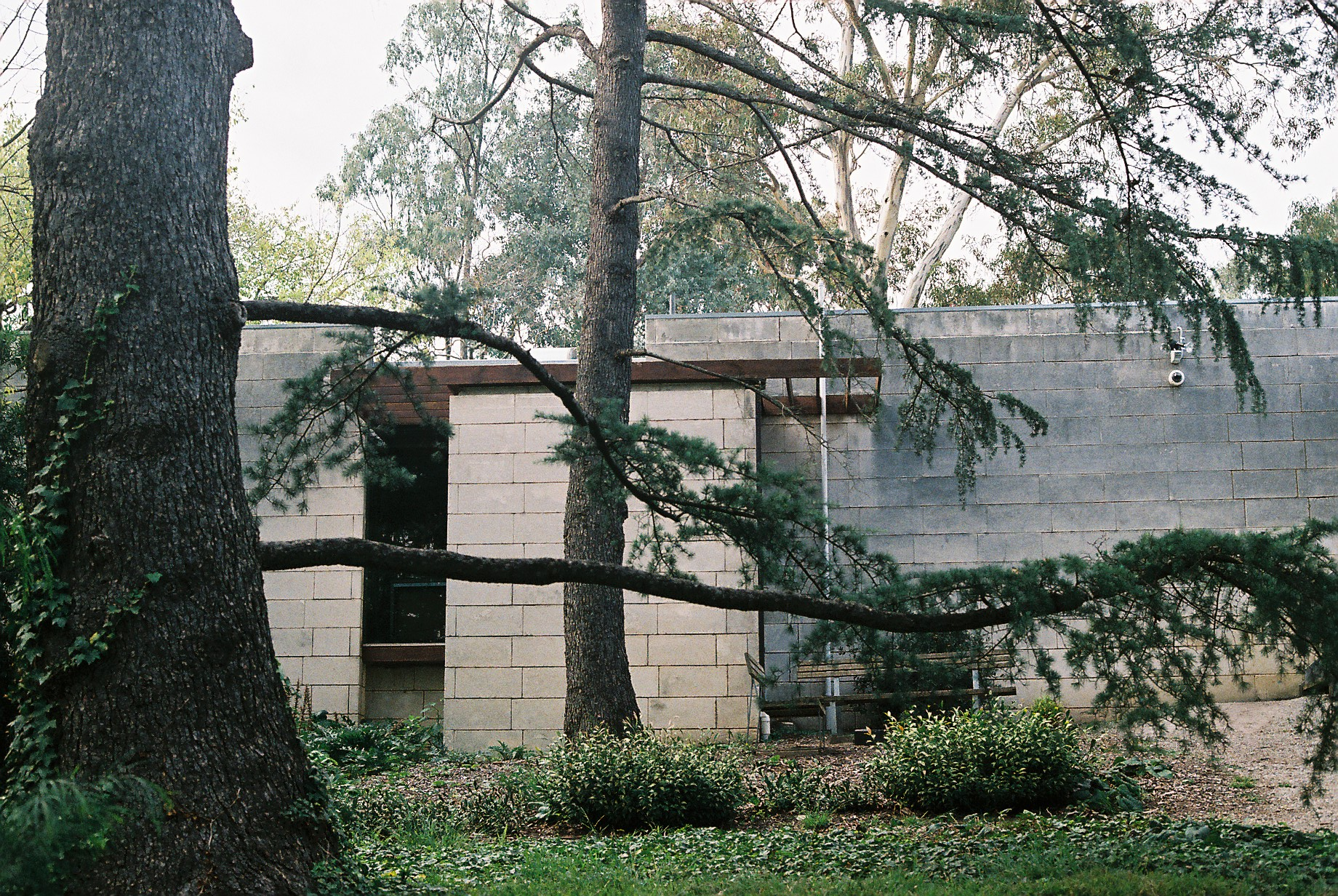
Heide II

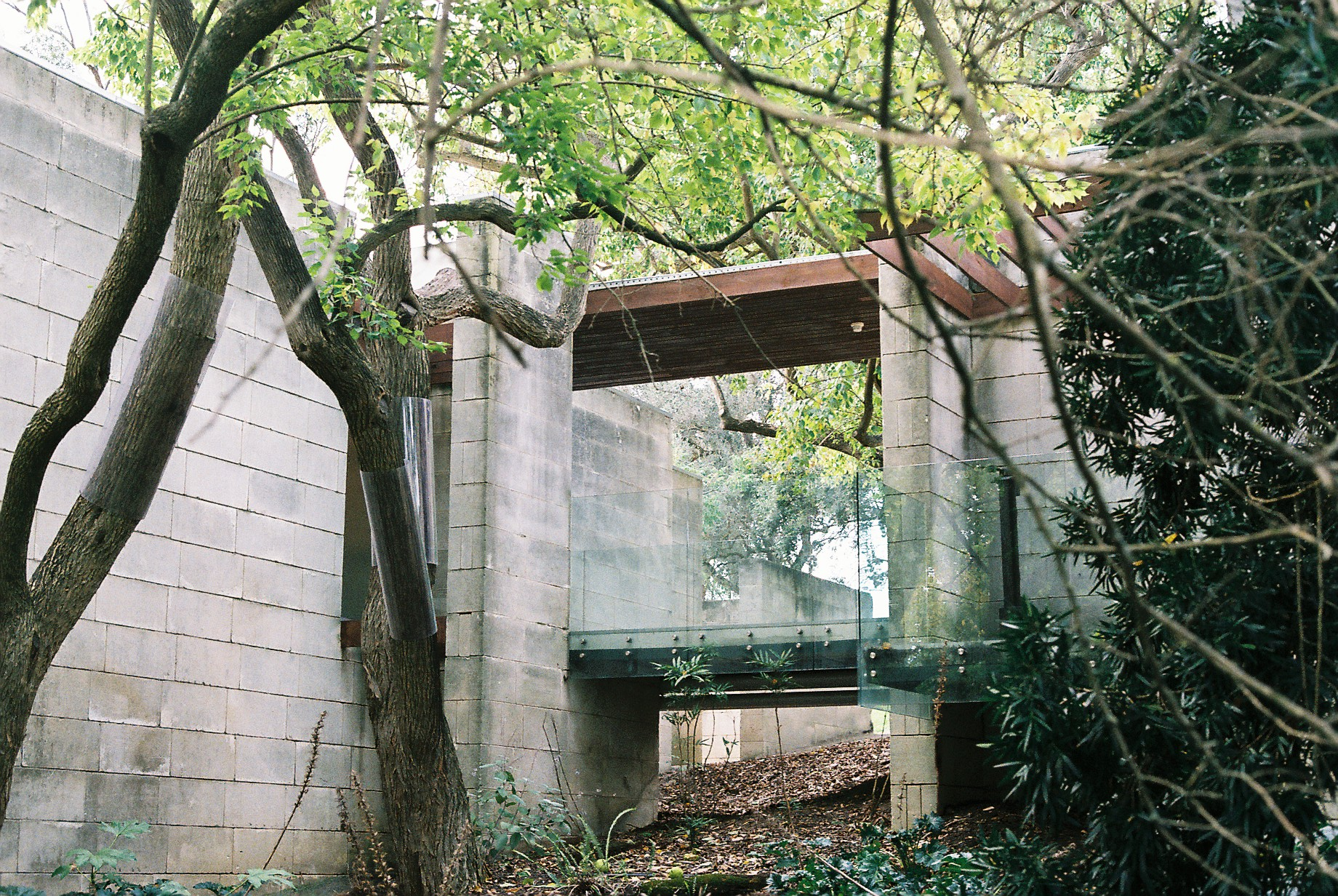
Heide II

=== Elliston Estate ===
In 1971 Merchant Builders Pty Ltd assembled a consultant team of award-winning domestic architects together with landscape architect Ellis Stones.

== Awards ==
- Royal Australian Institute of Architects, Victorian Architecture Medal
  - 1963 for Grimwade House, Rye
  - 1968 for Heide II, Bulleen (now Heide Museum of Modern Art)
