= Ralph Balson =

Australian painter

Ralph Balson (1890–1964) was an English born Australian artist. Balson was a leading figure in the modernist movement and is credited with holding the first solo exhibition of abstract work in Australia.

Balson, initially a plumber and house painter, migrated to Sydney when he was 23. He took up art in his spare time and, from 1934 to 1937, explored Cubist principles at the Crowely-Fizelle School. Introduced to works of Wassily Kandinsky, Fernand Léger, and Piet Mondrian, Balson began teaching abstract painting in 1949 and committed full-time to art in 1955. Influences from his travels in 1960 included Jackson Pollock, Alberto Burri, and Antoni Tapiès. His works are held by the National Gallery of Australia, the Art Gallery of New South Wales, and the National Gallery of Victoria.

== Early life ==
Balson was born in Bothenhampton, Dorset, England. After attending the village school he became an apprentice in 1903 to become a plumber and house painter. At the age of 23, Balson migrated to Sydney, Australia. In Sydney, 1914, he married Emilie Kathleen Austin at the All Saints Anglican Church, Woollahra. During this time, he supported his family by working as a house painter and took up art in his spare time. In March 1915 Balson applied to join the First Australian Imperial Force but was rejected on medical grounds for his eyesight.

== Career ==
In 1932, when Grace Crowley and Rah Fizelle established the Crowely-Fizelle School in George Street, Sydney Balson assisted by painting the premises. It was here that Balson painted from 1934 to 1937 and explored geometric Cubist principles of composition. The artists Eleonore Lange and Frank Hinder were responsible for introducing Balson to the work of Wassily Kandinsky, Fernand Léger and Piet Mondrian. In 1955 Balson retired from house painting and devoted himself to his art career. From 1949 to 1959 he taught abstract painting at East Sydney Technical College. In 1960 Balson traveled to Europe and the United States, visiting exhibitions of American minimalism and hard-edge abstraction. During this time he developed an appreciation for and was influenced by the work of Jackson Pollock, Alberto Burri and Antoni Tapiès.

Canberra Times critic, Geoffrey de Groen, wrote in 1975 that Balson's Portrait of Grace Crowley "painted in 1939 was very advanced then, and is much more daring than the countless thousands of boring portraits made since".

== Gallery collections ==
Twenty-six of his artworks from the 1930s to 1962 are held by the National Gallery of Australia. Eighteen of his works are in the collection of the Art Gallery of New South Wales, including his Girl in pink (1937) and examples of his pointillist style, Abstract (1956) and Painting no 9 (1959). Six paintings are held by the National Gallery of Victoria.
