= Heide Museum of Modern Art =

Art museum in Melbourne, Australia

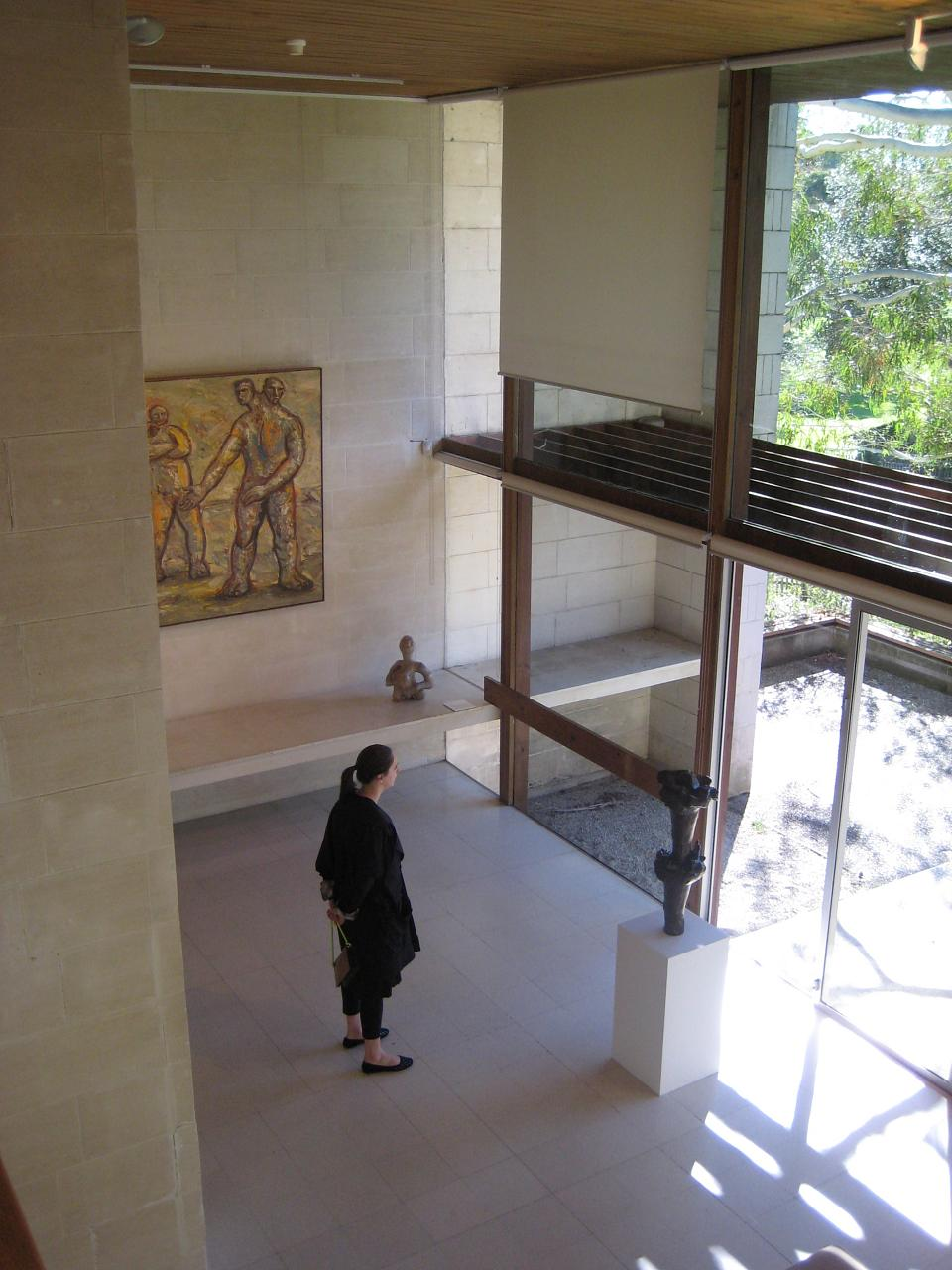
- The main gallery space of Heide II
- Established: 1981
- Location: Bulleen, Melbourne, Victoria, Australia
- Coordinates: 37°45′31″S 145°05′03″E
- Type: Modern art, contemporary art
- Visitors: 70,000
- Public transit access: Route 903 SmartBus from Heidelberg Station
- Website: www.heide.com.au

The Heide Museum of Modern Art, also known as Heide, is an art museum in Bulleen, a suburb of Melbourne, Victoria, Australia. Established in 1981, the museum exhibits modern and contemporary art across three buildings and is set within sixteen acres of heritage-listed gardens and a sculpture park.

The museum occupies the site of a former dairy farm, purchased by arts benefactors John and Sunday Reed in 1934. Heide became the gathering place for a collective of young modernist painters known as the Heide Circle, which included Sidney Nolan, John Perceval, Albert Tucker and Joy Hester, who often stayed in the Reeds' 19th-century farmhouse, now known as Heide I. Today they rank among Australia's best-known artists and are also considered leaders of the Angry Penguins, a modernist art movement named after a journal co-published by the Reeds and poet Max Harris. Heide's close relationship to this movement is reflected in much of its art collection.

Between 1964 and 1967, the Reeds built a new residence, Heide II, now considered one of the finest examples of modernist architecture in Victoria. In 1980, after several years of negotiations, the Reeds sold most of Heide and significant works from their art collection to the Victorian Government for the establishment of a public art museum and park. In 1993, Heide III, a new purpose-built gallery building designed by Andrew Andersons, was added to the Heide complex. This building was extended when Heide underwent major redevelopments in 2005–06. Also during this period, the Sidney Myer Education Centre was built, Heide II and the surrounding gardens were restored, and new facilities were constructed.

Since Heide was established, the museum's collection has expanded through many individual gifts, and in keeping with the Reeds' original aim, continues to support young and emerging artists.

== History ==
=== Early history ===
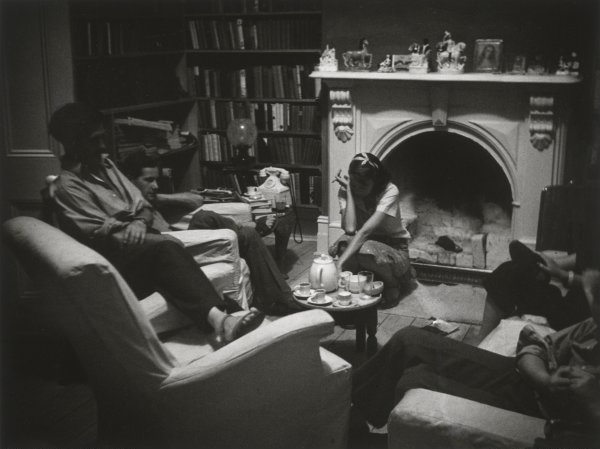
Members of the Heide Circle, including the Reeds and Sidney Nolan, gathered in the library at Heide I, 1942

The museum is situated on land originally used by indigenous peoples, a history evident in a distinguished scarred tree at the top of the property, called Yingabeal. In late colonial times through to the early twentieth century the site was a grazing property and dairy farm with a frontage on the Yarra River. The original farmhouse was built in the 1870s. From the nineteenth century onward, the area was frequented by artists and writers who found the Yarra River and surrounding hills east of Melbourne an ideal setting in which to work, exemplified in the formation of the Heidelberg School at Heidelberg, the Montsalvat artists' colony in Eltham, and various artists' camps in locations such as Box Hill and Warrandyte.

In 1934, the farm was purchased by John and Sunday Reed, passionate supporters and collectors of modern Australian art, who named the property Heide after the nearby town of Heidelberg. After moving into the farmhouse in 1935, they established a unique private library, including modernist literature, international art books, journals and magazines. Heide became a focal point for progressive art and culture as the Reeds opened their home to like-minded individuals such as artists Sidney Nolan, Albert Tucker, Joy Hester, Gray Smith, John Perceval and Danila Vassilieff. Nolan, who lived at Heide intermittently for almost a decade, painted his celebrated Ned Kelly series in the farmhouse's dining room in 1946–47.

In 1963, the Reeds commissioned Melbourne architect David McGlashan to design a new residence on the property, one that had a sense of mystery and romance, and was "a gallery to be lived in". Synthesising local and international design ideas, the light-filled home they called Heide II was constructed out of Mount Gambier limestone with a palette of minimal secondary materials and neutral colours. The Reeds moved into Heide II in 1967 and Sunday Reed established the second kitchen garden near the new house.

=== Museum establishment ===
The Reeds returned to live in Heide I, the old farmhouse after selling Heide II, most of the adjoining property and a significant portion of their art collection (113 works) to the Victorian State Government in August 1980. The purchase was agreed to and formalised by the Minister for the Arts at the time, the Hon. Norman Lacy, who continued to provide the Government's on-going support for the creation of a public art gallery on the site, to be named 'Heide Park and Art Gallery'. The interior of Heide II was modified in preparation of it opening as a public art gallery in November 1981. Now Heide Museum of Modern Art operates as a non-profit company limited by guarantee, and on behalf of the Victorian Government, a Board of Directors is delegated as a Committee of Management.

Dr Norman Wettenhall was appointed the first Chairman and the then Premier of Victoria, Sir Rupert Hamer was honoured as the inaugural Patron. Maudie Palmer AO was appointed the inaugural Director.

=== Recent history ===
The museum underwent major redevelopment in 2005–06 which included the installation of several sculptural and installation art pieces, landscaping and redesign of the gardens, construction of a new education centre & gallery space, extension of the Heide III building to incorporate works from the Barbara Tucker Gift and various other works. On 13 July 2006 the museum officially re-opened after its $3 million dollar renovation and extension. The new buildings were designed by O'Connor + Houle Architecture.

== Governance ==
From 2008 until 2014, Jason Smith was curator and CEO of the gallery.

== Buildings, features, and layout ==
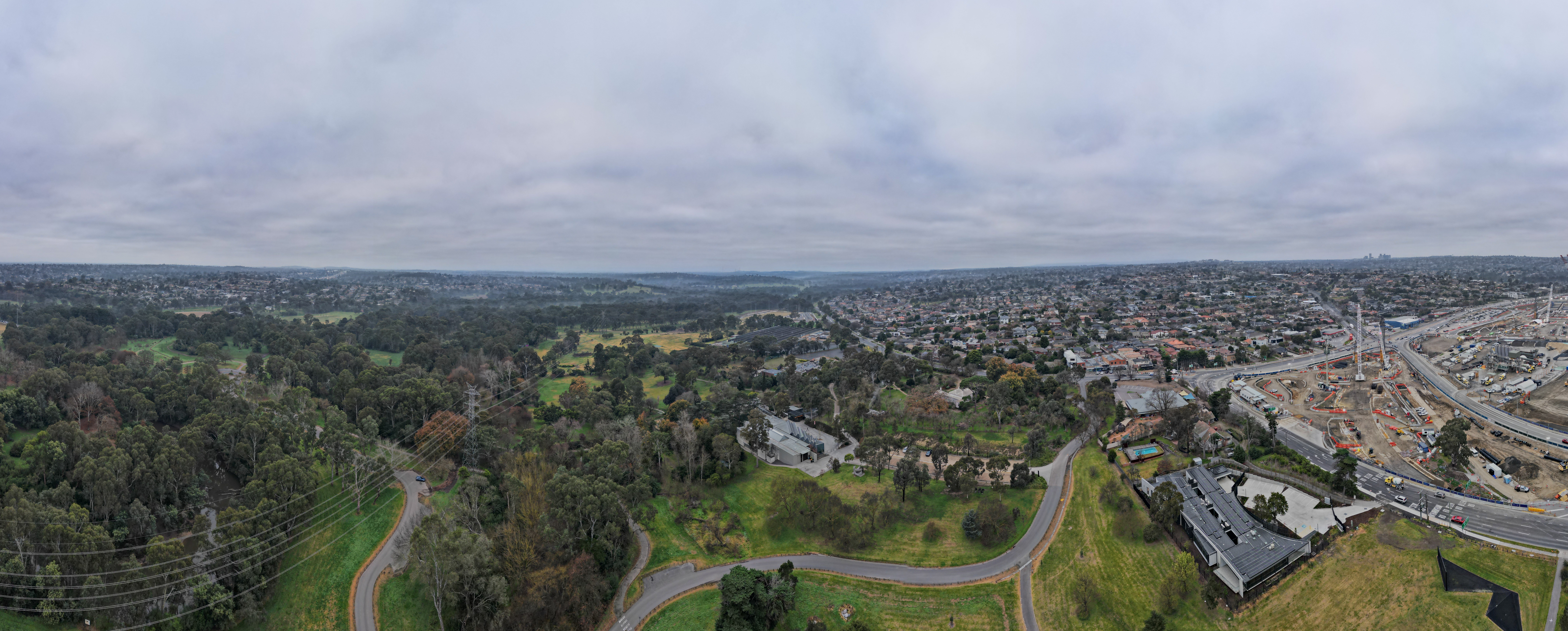
Banksia Park and Heide from above, 2024

Heide is situated on a former floodplain of the Yarra River in Bulleen. It is bordered to the north-east and east by the Yarra Valley Country Club, to the west and south by Banksia Park, and to the south-east by Templestowe Road. The site borders the Yarra River, at Fannings Bend, in its north-west corner. The museum itself comprises several detached buildings and surrounding gardens and parklands on the site, described in further detail below, all of which are used in various capacities as exhibition spaces.

=== Buildings and facilities ===
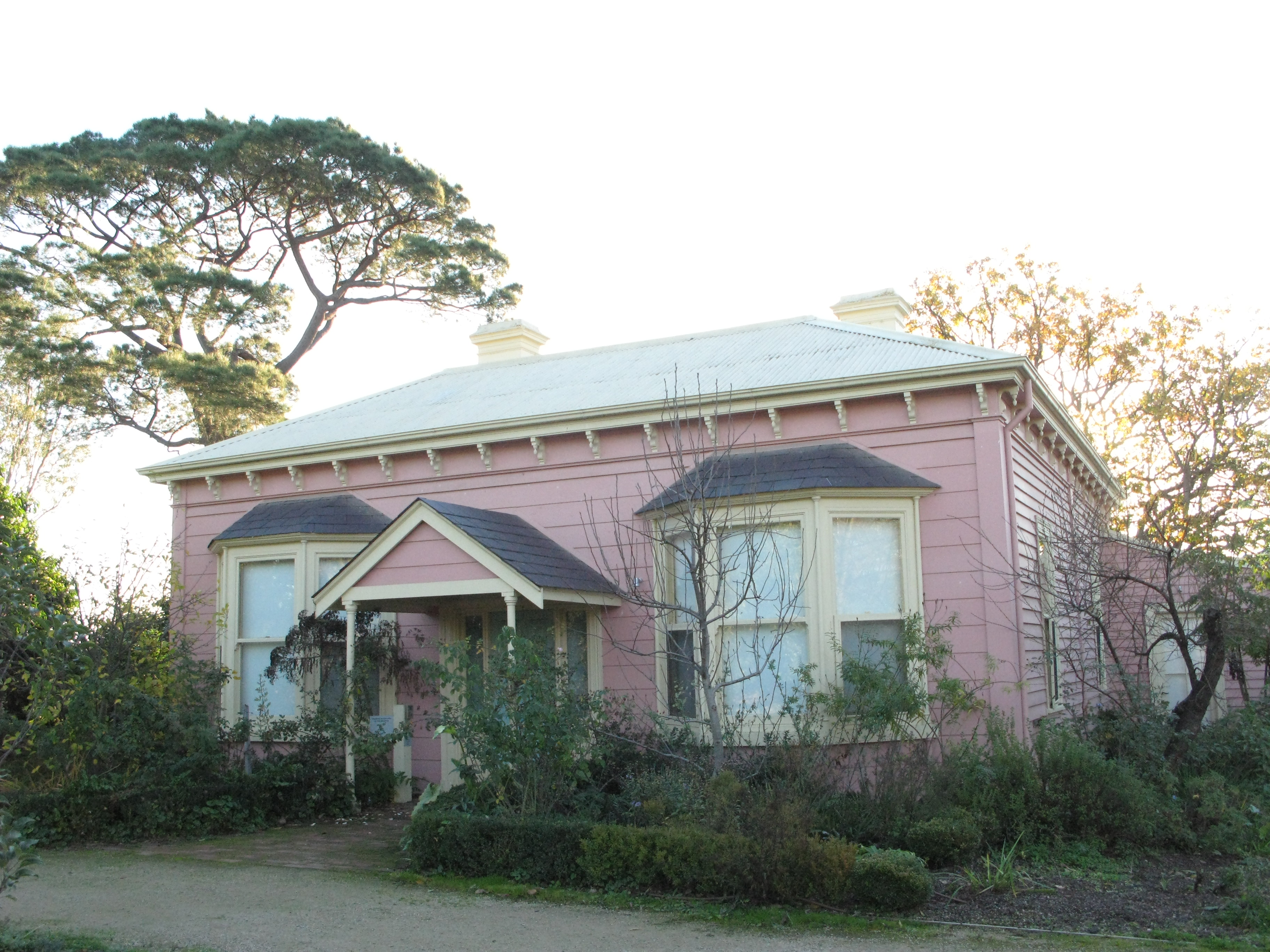
Heide I, a former farmhouse and now one of the museum's exhibition spaces

- Heide I

A former farmhouse dating from the 1870s, the building was purchased by the Reeds in 1934 and renovated in the French Provincial style. It underwent various renovations in 1934–35, 1954 and 1980 and was restored in 2001 and in 2010. Currently it is dedicated to exhibitions and displays from the Heide Collection and Archive.

- Heide II

Commissioned by the Reeds in 1963, Heide II was designed by architect David McGlashan of the Melbourne firm McGlashan Everist, and constructed between 1964 and 1967. It was intended as "a gallery to be lived in" and served as the Reeds' residence between 1967 and 1980. The building is considered one of the best examples of modernist architecture in Victoria and was judged 'Outstanding Building of the Year' by the Royal Australian Institute of Architects. It is currently used to display works from the Heide Collection and on occasion projects by contemporary artists.

- Heide III

Originally designed by Andrew Andersons of Peddle Thorp Architects, Heide III was built in 1993, and extended in 2005 by O'Connor and Houle Architecture to include additional exhibition spaces, storage facilities and visitor amenities. It is the largest gallery wing of the museum including: the Central Galleries; the Albert and Barbara Tucker Gallery, the Kerry Gardner and Andrew Myer Project Gallery; the Tucker Study Centre; and the Heide Store.

- Sidney Myer Education Centre

Designed by O’Connor and Houle Architecture and built in 2005, its purpose is expressed as "a dynamic learning and thinking space for teachers, students, and community groups." The centre accommodates diverse education and public programs based on the art, architecture and gardens of Heide.

- Heide Cafe

After a 19-month redevelopment program the cafe at reopened to the public on 24 November 2009. The $1.5 million redevelopment was designed by Chris Connell Design (CCD). Inspired by the award-winning architecture of Heide and its beautiful gardens, situated in the former Heide II motor court, the café's glass pavilion seats 55 patrons inside and an outdoor area seats an additional 55 patrons.

=== Gardens and Sculpture Park ===
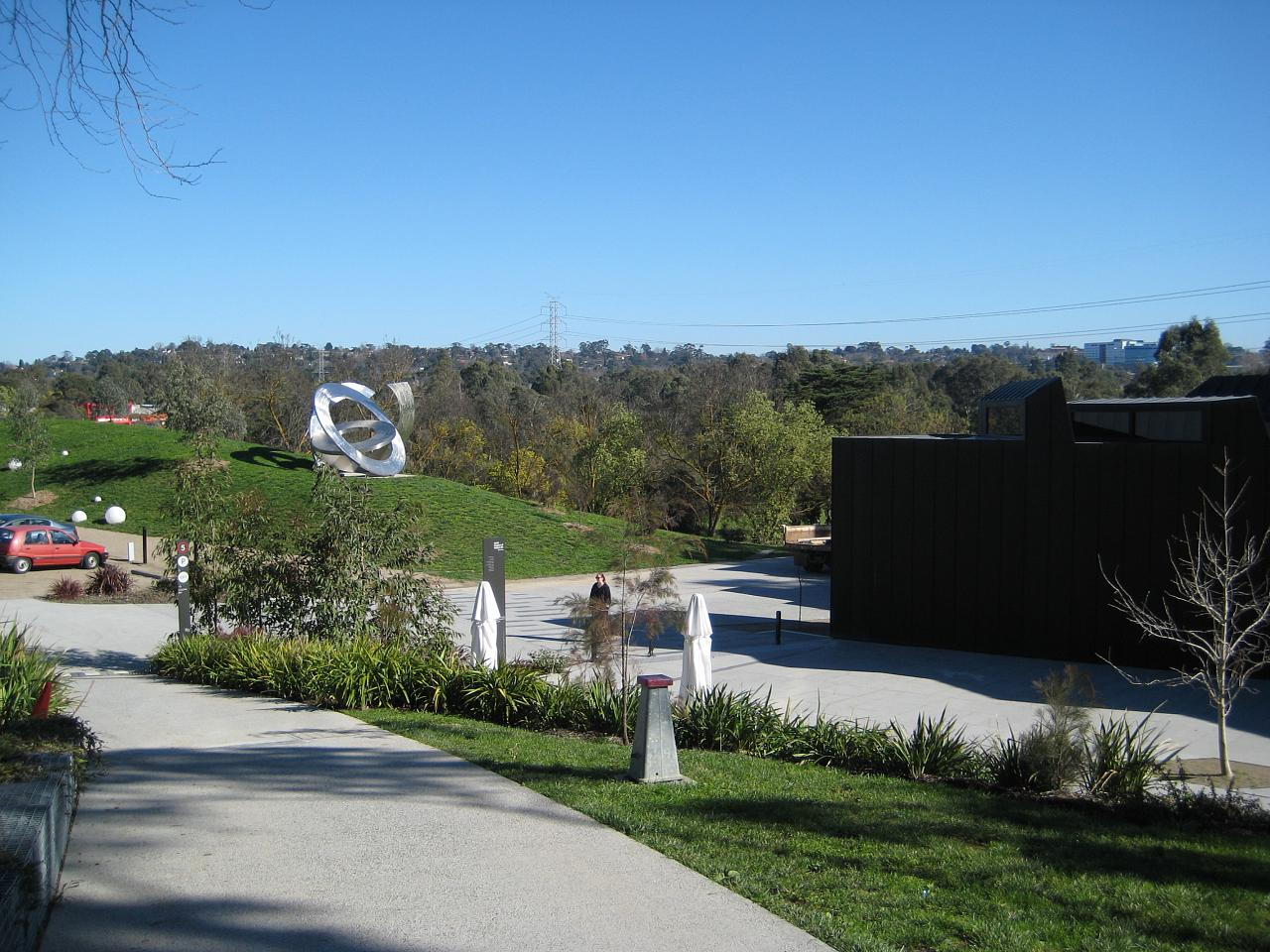
Garden

The sixteen acres of landscape at Heide have been developed over several decades in tandem with its art and architecture. When John and Sunday Reed purchased Heide in 1934, it was a neglected former dairy farm. They immediately set about reviving and extending the productive kitchen garden adjacent to the original farmhouse and initiated a major planting program, with a view to turning the property into a verdant parkland. Today, the cultivated landscape includes a sculpture park with over forty sculptures, several of the original gardens which are now heritage-listed, an Indigenous Remnant Conservation Zone and a diverse range of exotic trees, unusual roses, herbs, flowers and vegetables.

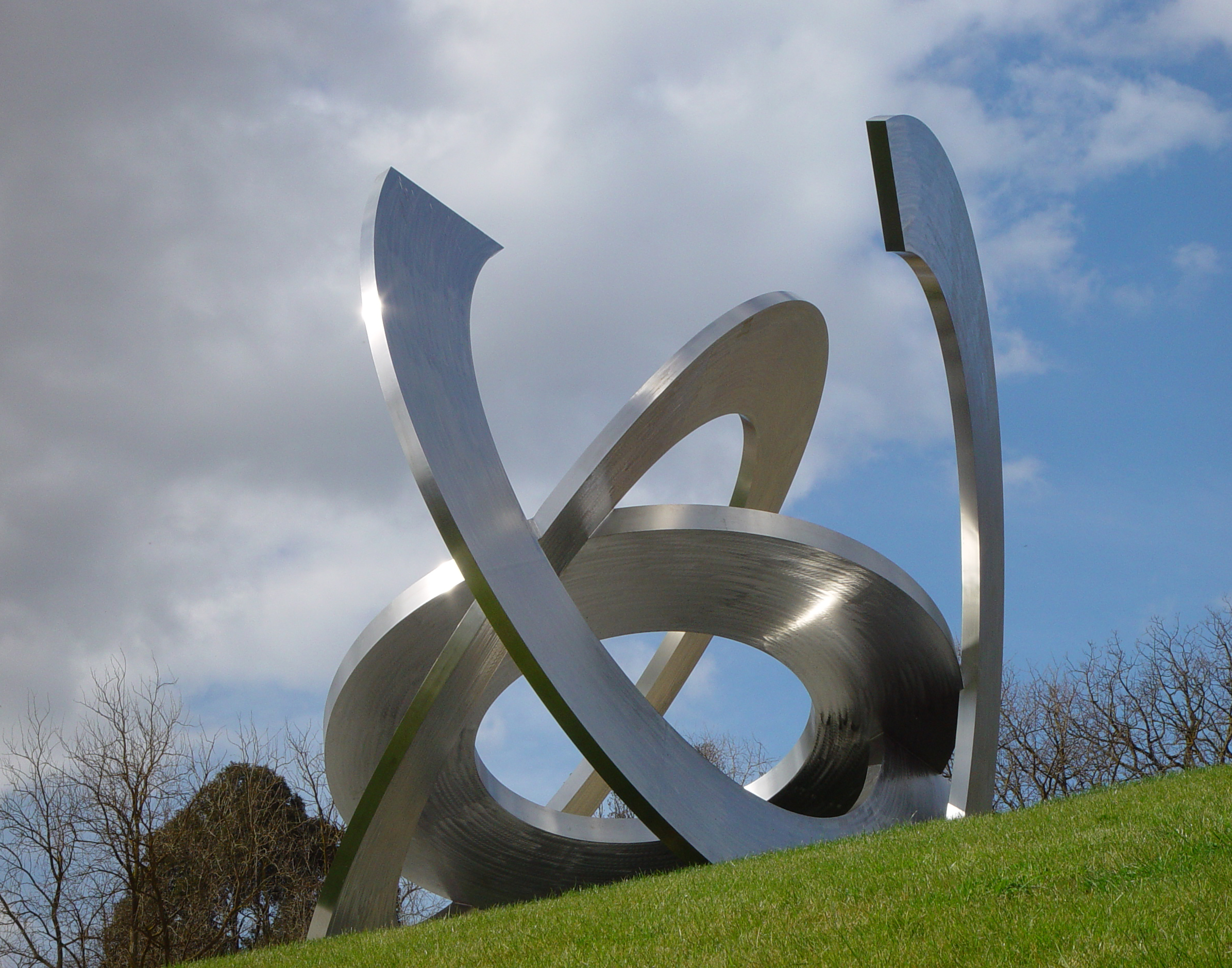
Inge King, Rings of Saturn

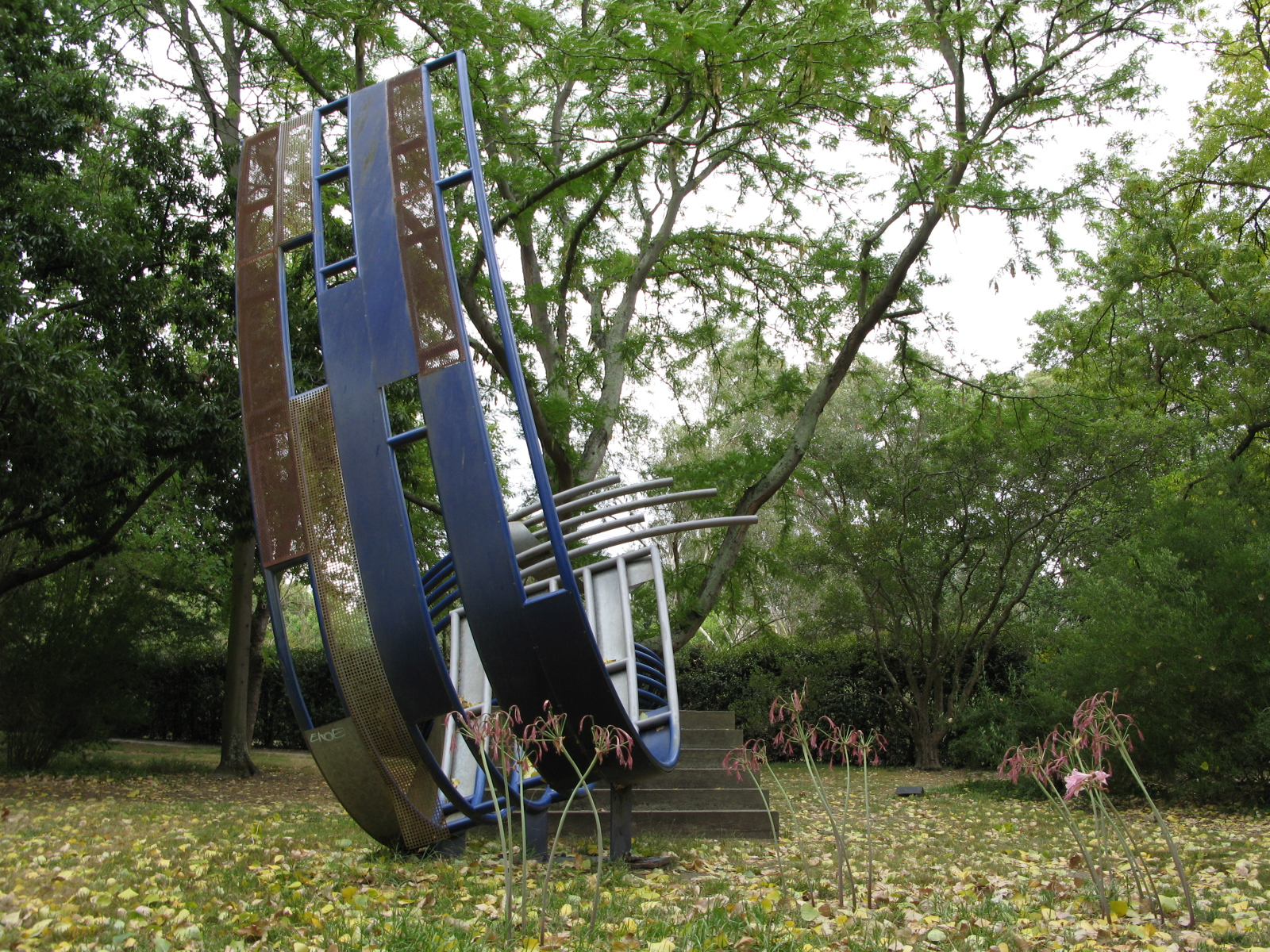

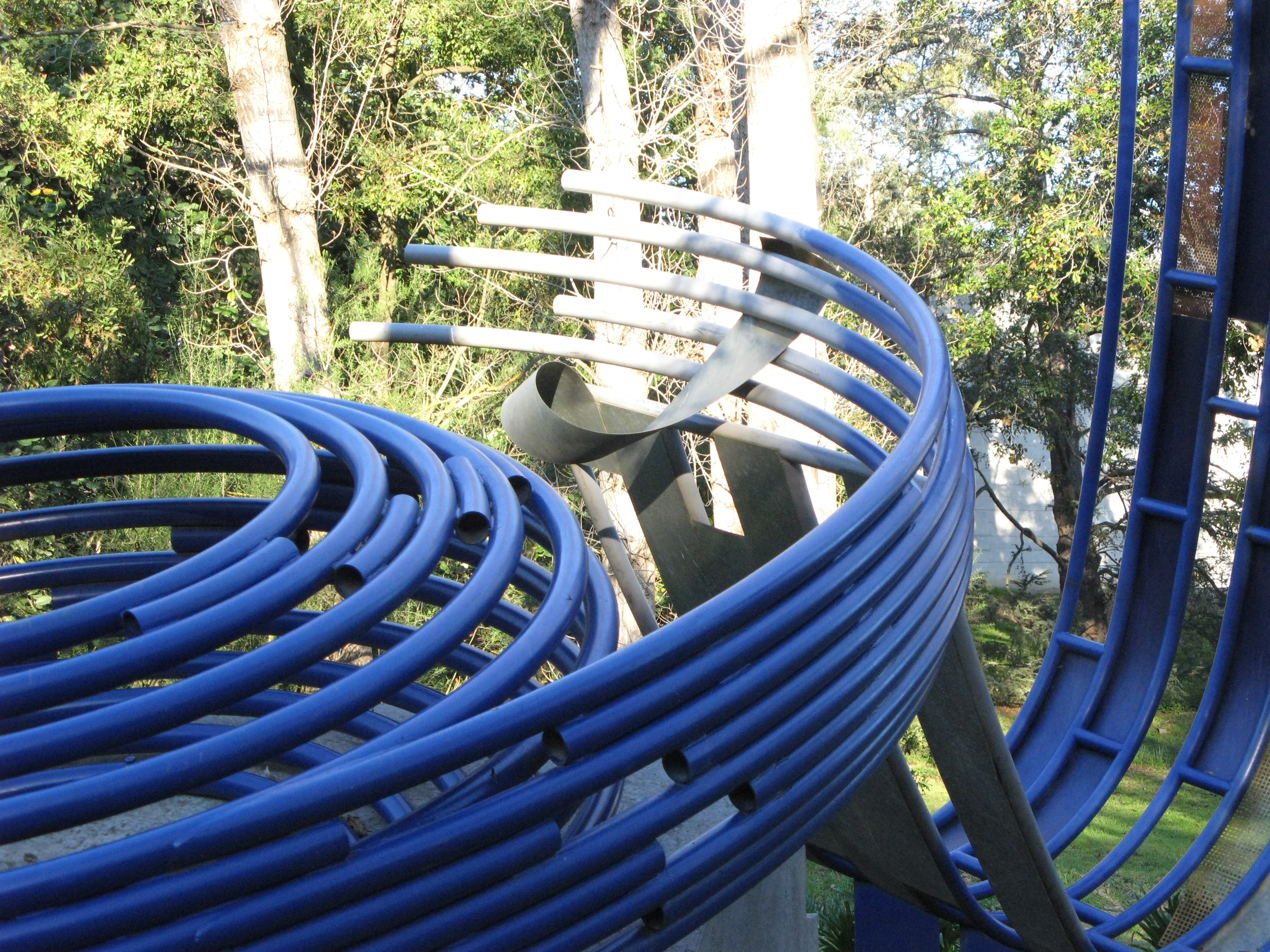
Dennis Oppenheim, Basket and Wave

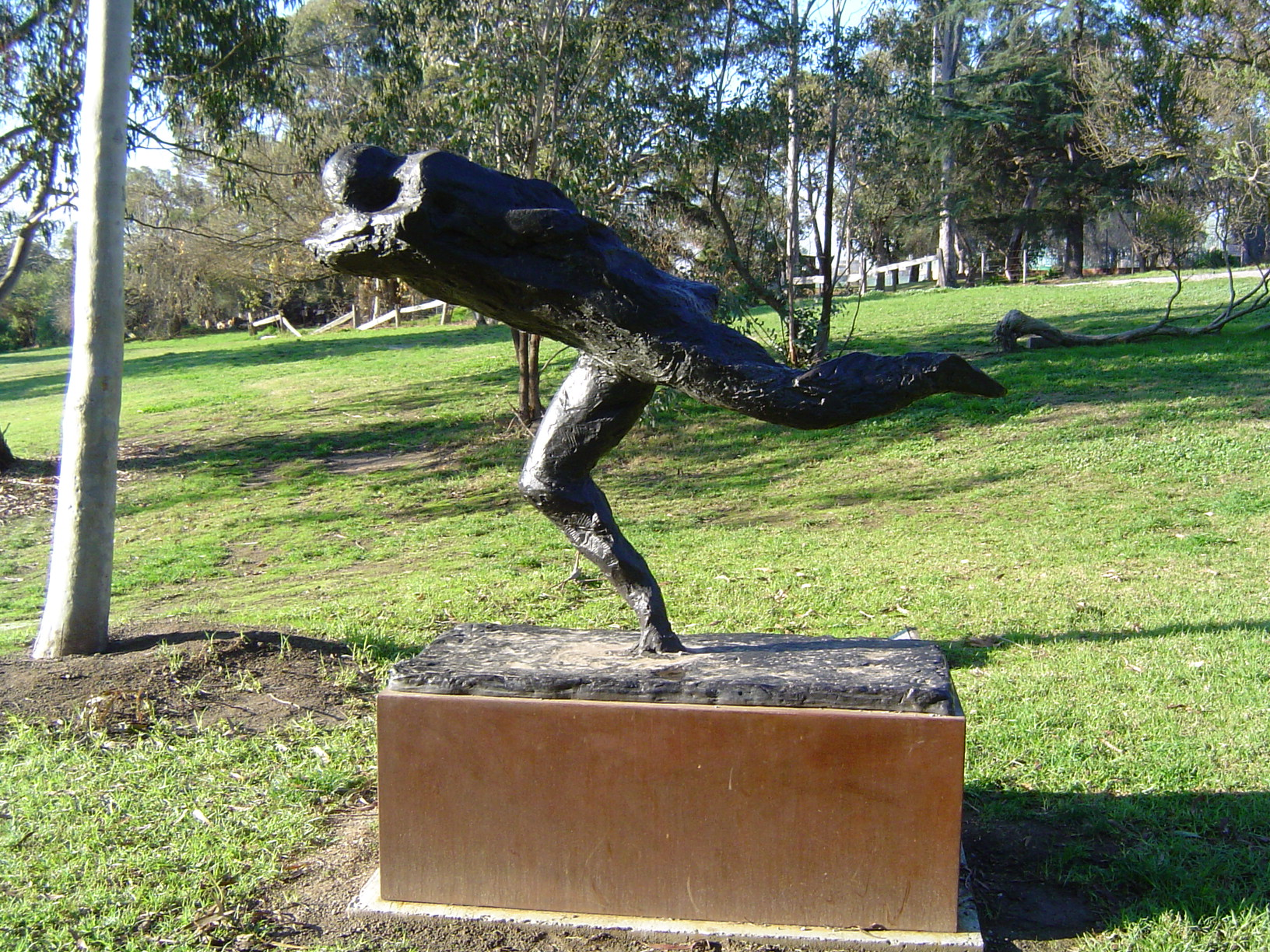
Rick Amor, The Running Man

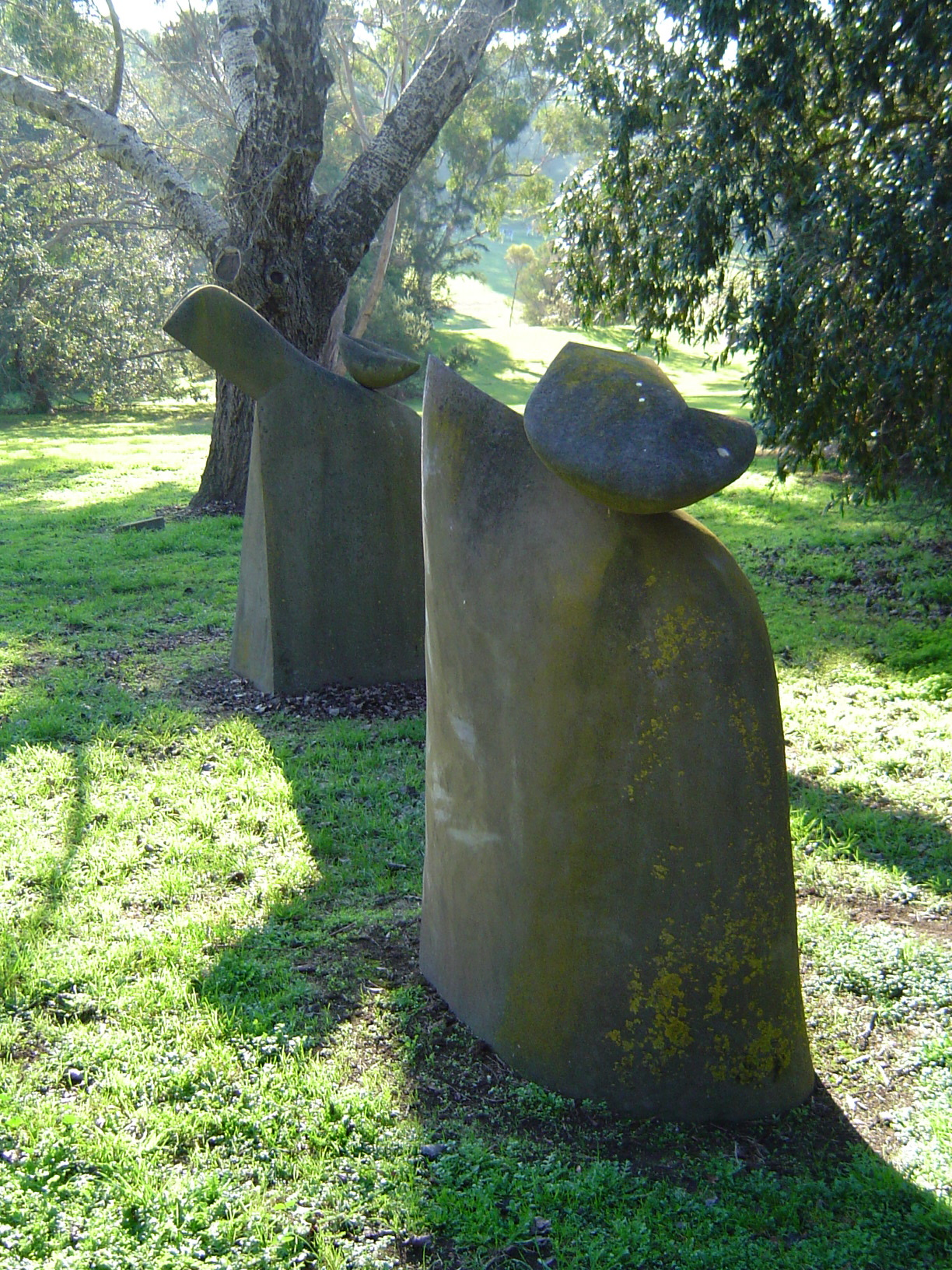
Ronald Upton, Stages 1, 2, 3

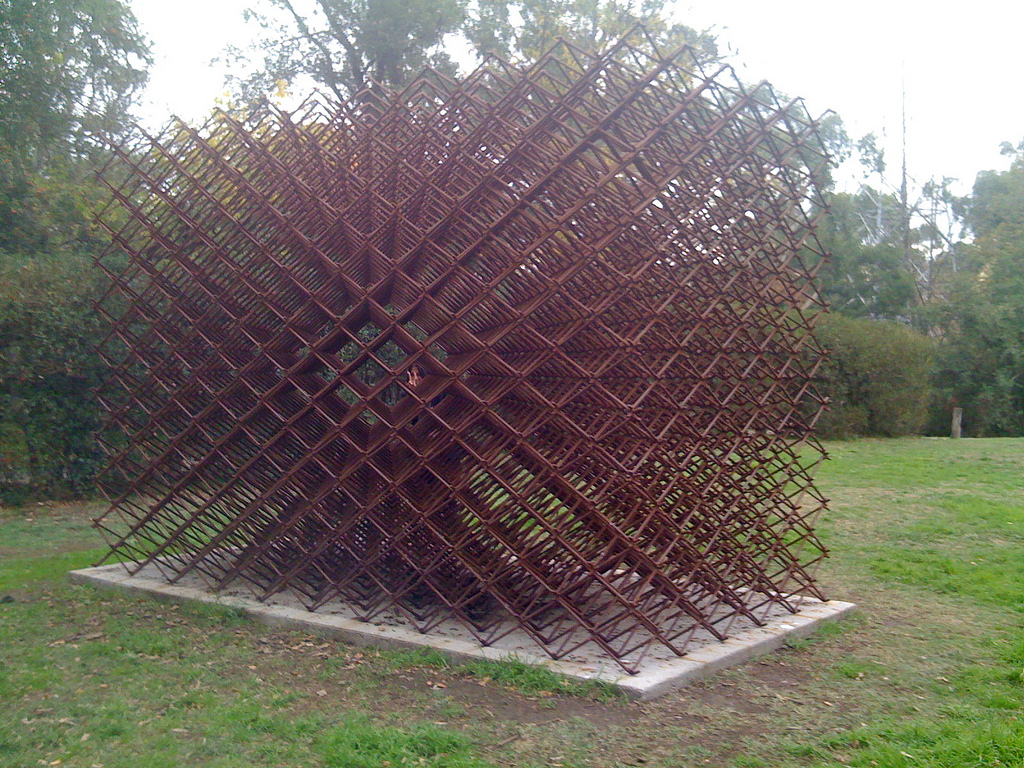
Neil Taylor, Theoretical Matter

== Access ==
- Heide I, II and III: Open Tuesday to Sunday, 10:00am–5:00pm
- Heide Store (in Heide III): Open Tuesday to Sunday, 10:00am–5:00pm
- Gardens & Sculpture Park – FREE

== The Heide Collection ==
The core of the museum's collection was assembled over five decades by Heide founders John and Sunday Reed, who collected a broad range of art from the 1940s to the 1970s, both figurative and abstract. The collection includes works by artists such as Moya Dyring, Sidney Nolan, Albert Tucker, Joy Hester, Gray Smith, John Perceval, Arthur Boyd, Charles Blackman, Peter Booth, Mike Brown, Richard Larter, Wolfgang Sievers.

== See also ==
- Art of Australia
- National Gallery of Victoria
- National Gallery of Australia
- Heidelberg School
- Montsalvat
- Box Hill artists' camp
- Heide Circle
