= National Works on Paper =

Australian art award

National Works on Paper Award
- Description: Contemporary art made on or with paper
- Location: Mornington, Victoria, Australia
- Presented by: Mornington Peninsula Regional Gallery
- Website: mprg.mornpen.vic.gov.au/Exhibitions/National-Works-on-Paper

The National Works on Paper (NWOP) award is an Australian art award presented by the Mornington Peninsula Regional Gallery in Mornington, Victoria.

== History ==
The National Works on Paper, or NWOP, award Australia was established by Mornington Peninsula Regional Gallery in 1998. Its predecessors were the former Spring Festival of Drawing and Prints Acquisitive, established in 1973 and 1974.

== Description ==
The award comprises a body of related awards for contemporary art made on, or with, paper. Previous entries have included drawing, printmaking, digital prints, and paper sculpture.

The award is made biennially, except during the years 1998 to 2000, and 2002 to 2004, when it was made annually. The award and its accompanying exhibition are hosted by the Mornington Peninsula Regional Gallery, located in Mornington, Victoria.

== Prizes ==
In 2008, the total prize pool of the National Works on Paper Award was worth A$45,000 and had three components:

- The John Tallis Acquisitive Award, valued at A$15,000
- The Mornington Peninsula Regional Shire Acquisition Fund awards, valued at up to A$20,000
- The Friends of the Mornington Peninsula Regional Gallery Acquisition Fund awards, valued at up to A$10,000

In 2024, the awards comprised:

- Major Acquisitive Award, worth A$20,000
- Emerging Artist Award, worth A$5000

Several artists were also beneficiaries of the Friends of the MPRG Acquisition fund and the MPRG Acquisition fund (amount undisclosed).

== Winners of the major award ==
- 1998 - Christopher Hodges
- 1999 - Jennifer Buntine
- 2000 - Matthew Butterworth
- 2002 - eX de Medici
- 2003 - Lisa Roet
- 2004 - Paul Boston
- 2006 - Gareth Sansom
- 2008 - Danie Mellor
- 2010 - Richard Lewer
- 2014 - Jess Johnson
- 2016 - Daniel O'Shane
- 2018 - James Tylor & Laura Wills
- 2020 - Annika Romeyn
- 2022 - Anna Hoyle
- 2024 - D Harding
