= Marciano (disambiguation) =

Marciano is both a given name and a surname.

Marciano can also refer to:

- Léo Marciano, French luxury fashion house founded in 1970 by the eponymous designer Léo Marciano
- Marciano Stores, an American clothing line, owned by Guess? Inc.
- Marciano della Chiana, municipality in the Province of Arezzo, in the Italian region Tuscany
  - Battle of Marciano (also known as the Battle of Scannagallo), in Marciano della Chiana, Tuscany, in 1554
- Rocky Marciano (film), 1999 TV-film presented by MGM
- Marciano, a 1979 TV movie directed by Bernard L. Kowalski
- Roque Marciano, album by Brazilian rock band, Detonautas
