= Castel Felice =

Ocean liner (1930–1970)

Postcard purchased in 1955 depicting the liner 'Castel Felice'

Castel Felice was an Italian ocean liner built in 1930 and owned by Società Italiana Trasporti Marittimi (SITMAR) from 1952 until being broken up in 1970.

== History ==
The Castel Felice, as she was eventually named, was built in Glasgow by Alexander Stephen & Sons in 1930 for the British India Company as the Kenya, launched 27 August 1930 and commencing her maiden voyage to Bombay on 18 December 1931, then operated with sister ship Karanja between India and Africa carrying 66 first class, 120 second class and 1700 third class passengers (mainly Indian immigrants) and cargo.

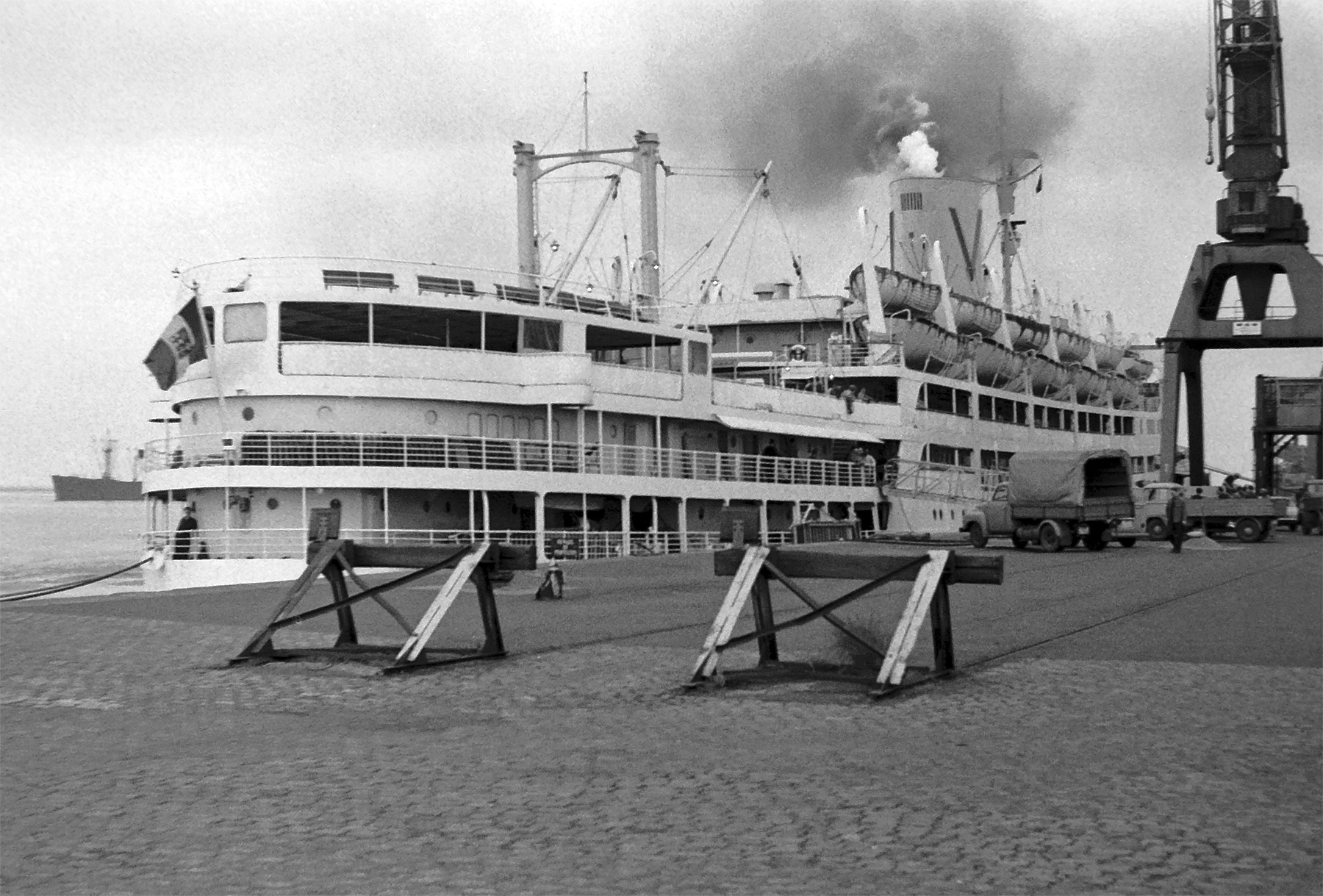
Castle Felice 1965 in Bremerhaven

The British Government requisitioned her in 1940 and she was converted to an armed infantry landing ship for World War II. Renamed first HMS Hydra, then HMS Keren, she was used to land troops for action in Madagascar, Sicily and North Africa.

The British India Line refused an option to resume ownership after the war in 1946 and consequently she was purchased by the British Ministry of Transport. Laid up at Holy Loch in Scotland she was subsequently purchased by the Vaslav group. In 1949 the vessel broke moorings and was swept ashore in a heavy storm, refloated and towed to Glasgow for repairs where name reverted to Kenya. Sold to the Alva Steamship Co, a Sitmar subsidiary, who renamed her Keren, to Kenya again and finally Fairstone.

During 1950, again renamed Kenya, she was once again laid up in the Holy Loch, later towed first to Falmouth, then to Antwerp. Ownership was transferred to the Sitmar Line in October of that year and the vessel was later towed to Genoa for refitting, arriving on 22 August 1951. The ship was delivered to the company the following month and was renamed for the last time to Castel Felice (‘Happy Castle’) for her inaugural Australian voyage from Genoa to Melbourne.

She began the South American immigrant service in 1952. Two years later she was refitted with air conditioning and a swimming pool to commence the Atlantic service to New York, a year-round service from New York to Bremerhaven via Plymouth and Le Havre being announced by the Overseas Charter and Shipping Company, General Passenger Agents for the Sitmar Line being announced in 1957. On 15 August 1970, while docked in Southampton, a fire broke out in a cabin which was quickly extinguished, however the damage was never repaired and instead was sealed off from passengers. The ship arrived in Sydney on 26 September 1970 on her final voyage, departing on 7 October bound for Kaohsiung, Taiwan to be broken up, arriving on 21 October. The ship's cutlery and linen were transferred to Cunard for use on the Fairsea and Fairwind. Between 1952 and 1970, on a total of 101 voyages, she carried over 100,000 immigrants to Australia and New Zealand, of these, 16,126 were breadwinners and the others dependents.

== Configuration ==
- Engines: 11,000 s.h.p. six single-reduction-geared steam turbines / twin screws
- Rigging; 1 tripod style communications mast (2 masts, with cargo cranes)
- Surface Speed:15 knots, later 16 knots
- Dimensions: 150.3 x 19.6 m
- Depth: 7.6 m draught
- Tonnage: 12,150 GRT
- Passengers: 1,400 one class - based on her final configuration.
- Previous names: Kenya (1930), Hydra (1941), Keren (1941), Kenya (1949), Fairstone (1950), Kenya (1950), Keren (1951–52)

== Notable passengers ==
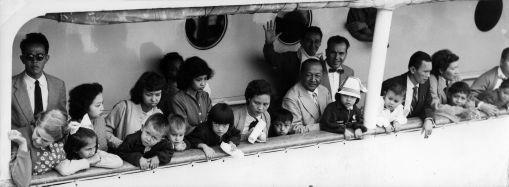
Arrival of the "Castel Felice" with Indo Eurasian repatriates from Indonesia; on the Lloydkade in Rotterdam, Netherlands, 20 May 1956

- Giorgio Mangiamele (13 August 1926 – 13 May 2001) was an Italian/Australian photographer and filmmaker, creator of Sebastian the Fox who migrated to Australia aged 26, on the Castel Feilce in 1952.
- Gino Nibbi, influential Italian-Australian author, art critic and bookseller, sailed on the Castel Felice to Lisbon from Sydney via the Panama Canal (during the Suez Crisis) in 1957.
- The Groop travelled to UK on the Sitmar line cruiser Castel Felice on 31 January 1968. Traveling with them was Molly Meldrum
- The Twilights, an Australian rock and pop music group of the mid- to late 1960s with vocalist Glenn Shorrock, in July 1966 at Festival Hall, Melbourne, won the Hoadley's Battle of the Sounds prize of a trip to the UK. On 26 September 1966, the group embarked for London on the Castel Felice.
- Ray (Raymond Frank) Mathew (14 April 1929 – 27 May 2002), an Australian author, was born in Sydney, New South Wales. Mathew wrote poetry, drama, radio plays and film scripts, short stories, novels, arts and literature criticism, and other non-fiction. He left Australia in 1960 on the Castel Felice and never returned, dying in New York where he had lived from 1968.
- Andrea Dworkin, while a student, was arrested in 1965 during an anti-Vietnam-War rally and imprisoned at New York Women's House of Detention, later testifying before a Grand Jury about her maltreatment there, receiving national and international news coverage resulting in the closure of the prison. Soon after, Dworkin left on the Castel Felice to live in Greece and to pursue her writing.
- Chantal Contouri, a Greek/Australian television and film actress and former dancer, best known for her role in the 1970s soap opera Number 96, migrated as a child to Australia on the ship in 1954.
- Clive Shakespeare (3 June 1947 – 15 February 2012), co-founder of pop rock group Sherbet, migrated with his family to Australia in August 1964 via Castel Felice. The family emigrated under the Government Assisted Passage Scheme to Sydney.
- Marina von Neumann Whitman (born 6 March 1935) is an American economist. She is a professor of Business Administration and Public Policy at the University of Michigan's Ross School of Business as well as The Gerald R. Ford School of Public Policy. Her father was John von Neumann, mathematician. She traveled from the US to Europe on the Castel Felice in 1954.
- Jeffrey Smart departed Australia for London on the Castel Felice out of Sydney on Christmas Day, 1963, driving to Greece fellow painter Justin O'Brien. On the same sailing was Margaret Reynolds (born 19 July 1941), Australian Labor Party Senator for Queensland from 1983 to 1999.
- Robyn Williams AM (born 1944 in Buckinghamshire, England) is a science journalist and broadcaster resident in Australia who has hosted the Science Show on the Australian Broadcasting Corporation since 1975, Ockham's Razor (created 1984) and In Conversation (created 1997). He immigrated to Australia from England in 1964 on the Castel Felice, and remembered the ship 'was off-white, and stank of stale fat.'
- Jutta Feddersen, tapestry and installation artist migrated alone from Germany to Australia on the Castel Felice in December 1956 at 26 years of age.
- Bruce Beresford, Australian film director, moved to the UK, sailing from Sydney 25 December 1963.
- Dr Denis Stark (Ophthalmologist) and Mary Jane Stark with children Tony, Sean, Tim and Denis, moved to the UK in 1968.
- Mervyn McLean University of Auckland ethnomusicologist traveled to Genoa in 1959 after completing his MA from the University of Otago

Bruce Beresford film maker, left Sydney on 25 December 1963 sailing to Southampton, England Jeffrey Smart, artist, sailed from Sydney 25 December 1963 to Naples, Italy Margaret Clingan Wright OAM CF FLS(London) scientific illustrator, recorder teacher and conductor of Canberra Recorder Orchestra sailed from Sydney 25 December 1963 to Southampton, England

== Literary references ==
- Events on the Castel Felice are at the centre of action in Calvin C. Hernton’s novel Scarecrow (Doubleday, 1974) which explores the fatal psychosexual, racial conflicts of voyagers on board.
- Mention in Gee, Maurice (1992). Going west. Penguin Books, Auckland, N.Z., 158.
- Hungarian playwright Kornél Hamvai's Castel Felice (2003) masquerades as a naturalist drama, but becomes surreal as passengers on the Castel Felice find themselves in a no-exit situation with national and existential dimensions.
- Mentioned in Adam Shand's (2010) King of Thieves: The Adventures of Arthur Delaney and the Kangaroo Gang, 44,49.
- Dave Diss, idealistic activist, Speakers’ Corner orator, broadcaster, author and visual artist, writes in chapter twenty-five 'Castel Felice' of his autobiography Creatures of our time, in a land fit for heroes, of fondly of 'sailing away on the Castel Felice, freed for once from the need to work for my crust. The novelty was that I could relax and enjoy the voyage with my family, in the luxury of idleness. When would I ever get the chance to have five unbroken weeks of it again?
- Columnist Irma Kurtz recounts her travel from New Jersey to Europe in 1954 as an 18-year-old student on the ship in Then Again : Travels in Search of My Younger Self.
- Paul D. Stolley dedicates his 1994 Foundations of Epidemiology co-authored with David E. Lilienfeld, 'To Jo Ann and the luck of the Castel Felice'.
- Australian historian Glenda Sluga includes Mario Maganj's photograph of the Castel Felice leaving Trieste on 26 February 1955 as an illustration (Fig. 6.3) in her 2001 The problem of Trieste and the Italo-Yugoslav border

== Bibliography ==
- Burdett, Sandra (2013) Ten Pound Poms. Author House. ISBN 9781491878019
- Jones, Lloyd (2013) A History of Silence: A Memoir. Text Publishing ISBN 9781922148360
- Baty, S. 1984. Ships That Passed – The Glorious Era of Travel to Australia and New Zealand. Reed Books Pty Ltd. Frenchs Forest.
- Plowman, P. 1992. Emigrant Ships to Luxury Liners. New South Wales University Press. Kensington.
- Plowman, P. 2004. The Sitmar Liners – Past and Present. Rosenberg Publishing Pty Ltd. NSW.
- Miller William H. Transatlantic Liners 1945-1980. Arco Pub 1981.
- Miller William H. The Last Blue Water Liners. 1st U.S. ed. St. Martin's Press 1986.
