= Realities Gallery =

Australian art gallery in Melbourne, closed 1992

Realities Gallery was a Melbourne gallery which showed work of Australian art of the western and indigenous traditions, and Pacific and international art. It operated from 1971 to 1992.

== History ==
=== Ross Street 1971–75 ===
In 1970 Danish-born Marianne Baillieu (1939–2012) set up business importing artworks for sale. With her husband, solicitor and businessman Ian Baillieu, they purchased a small retail property in Ross Street, Toorak, which they renovated to open Realities gallery there in April 1971. The Bulletin magazine described the gallery in up-market Toorak Village as having "the air of a sparkling white eggshell with almost every surface glazed white, including the floor which means the public must put on Abominable Snowman socks to be able to walk on it."

In October 1974 the gallery presented old master drawings, watercolours and prints rarely seen for sale in Australia. The works were acquired from London, Boston, and New York. A catalogue of 35 pages, including 12 pages of plates, displayed works in the exhibition from Italian, Dutch and French schools from the 16th to 18th centuries, including Annibale Carracci's Head of a Boy Wearing a Flat Cap priced at $A12,500; Giovanni Battista Tiepolo with two drawings ($A7,000 and $A8,000); and Jacob Jordaens' The Martyrdom of St Sebastian ($A7,500), with others by Bonasone, Boschi, Busiri, Cipriani, Ferri, Garzi, Graziani, Martini, Novelli, and Pinelli. Another achievement of this early period was Baillieu's sale of works to the Sydney Opera House which was then completing construction.

Realities attracted crowds of students and the general public and Baillieu expressed her delight in giving wide exposure to a broad range of the art that she showed, which included dolls, weaving and electronics as well as the traditional media:

“I like to produce exhibitions which have purpose. I like to classify, not just show things indiscriminately. I like to put together a formal survey which will produce an emotional reaction for the community, one aspect of an artist’s work, a trend or movement. For instance I have had exhibitions showing artists work today beside their work [of] 20 years ago."

=== Jackson Street 1975–1992 ===
The early 1970s brought a boom in sales of locally produced art, joining a worldwide upward trend in the art market that did not pause until the early 1990s. The major state galleries, especially those of Victoria and New South Wales which were glamorously re-housed, were collecting Australian works and receiving blockbuster exhibitions from overseas, and art was seen as a viable investment, with incentives provided by the culturally activist Whitlam government.

Deciding to concentrate on Australian artists, in 1975, Baillieu moved Realities to 33-35 Jackson Street, Toorak. Incidentally, the same year saw the closure of neighbouring Toorak Gallery 1.3 km away at 277 Toorak Rd., South Yarra, which had for ten years shown mainly contemporary Australian art.

Realities' new venue was on a larger site of 1,117 sq. metres occupied by historic buildings; a schoolhouse (c.1867), parish hall (c.1912), verger’s cottage (1928) and a small ablutions block, and had them renovated and combined by architect Ross Ramus of Gunn Hayball Pty. Ltd. The adaptation of the building as a gallery (most particularly the work to the Hall) was documented in a contemporary national survey as an example of the recycling of heritage buildings. George Baldessin's three-part sculpture in bronze, rusted steel and chrome was sited at the entrance, and the first exhibition was Roger Kemp's. Brigid Cole-Adams described the space in an April 1980 article on the occasion of Bailleu's departure;

"It is housed in an old church covered in morning glory which once echoed to the dibbing and dobbing or small scouts. Now the wooden ceilings have been opened with skylights and the white walls will take even the largest modern paintings. The main hall is used for exhibitions and a second room, through the office, displays work in stock…Off this room Is a small courtyard with [a sculpture of a woman in her bath] in polyester and epoxy resin by Port Fairy sculptor Don Stewart."

Aboriginal art also enjoyed unprecedented interest, and in August 1977, Baillieu presented Paintings by the Desert Tribes of Central Australia at Realities, the first exhibition by Papunya Tula artists at a commercial gallery, and sold Clifford Possum Tjapaltjarri's Warlugulong (1977), an acrylic on canvas painting, for A$1,200 to the Commonwealth Bank. After being on-sold several times, the work was auctioned in 2007 for $2.4 million, beating all previous records for Aboriginal artwork.

Realities was one of few contemporary art galleries to show photography just as it too became collectible. Photographer-exhibitors included Bill Henson, Mark Strizic, Grant Mudford, American Leigh Weiner, and Joyce Evans.

In 1981 as Gough Whitlam launched a biography of Melbourne artist Clifton Pugh at the gallery, he joked about having to make his speech in front of his nemesis Sir John Kerr in a controversial portrait painted by Pugh in 1975; "I'll have you know I had nothing to do with the placing of the exhibit." In the same year, a joint exhibition by Pugh and Frank Hodgkinson of works they made in Arnhem Land was sold out for $100,000 before opening, the works all purchased by the one buyer, the multi-millionaire former car salesman Dennis Gowing.

Baillieu was notably coy about money matters, saying "I never try to sell paintings, people have to ask me to buy them," and prices were not displayed on the works on exhibition, nor in the catalogues.

=== Administration ===
Baillieu remained director from 1971 until 1980. In 1976 Evi Robinson, as administrator, and Rhonda Senbergs, both partners of artists who exhibited there, joined her. Following her mother's death, in 1980 Baillieu sold the gallery to Pauline Wrobel for $365,000 (a value of $1,574,000 in 2019), and moved in 1981 to a studio house in Williamstown to paint full time, becoming a finalist in the 1988 Archibald Prize with a controversial three-metre tall semi-abstract portrait of filmmaker Paul Cox which attracted further notoriety when it was cut and smeared by vandals.

The gallery continued under the management of Wrobel and Robinson who retained most of the stable of artists. The scale of most paintings exhibited meant they were rarely purchased for domestic settings, so buyers were museums, public galleries, banks and corporations, and amongst the purchasers of artworks from Realities were Government departments including, for example, the Department of Home Affairs and Environment ($3,500 and $6,150 in 1982), and New South Wales Artbank ($11,900 in 1988, and $2,950 in 1989).

== Closure ==
The gallery was forced by the economic recession in July 1992 to shut its doors, and on its announcement of closure Luba Bilu, Chair of the Australian Commercial Galleries Association, remarked that "important things had happened at Realities" which helped to establish its reputation for "honesty and integrity." The building was sold for $840,000 in November 1992.

== Exhibitions ==
=== Exhibitions held at the gallery while at Ross Street, Toorak ===
- 1971, 14 May – 5 May: Group exhibition: Jutta Feddersen tapestries; Richard Anuszkiewicz silkscreen prints; Michael McKinnon kinetics; Oiva Toikka glass sculptures
- 1971, 9 June – 3 July: Douglas Annand, Cresside Collette, the Optronic Kinetics group founded 1970 at Tin Sheds at Sydney University and including Bert Flugelman, Jim McDonnell, David Smith
- 1971, from 4 August: Mirka Mora solo show, dolls and drawings
- 1972, 6–29 April: Richard Brecknock (sculptures), Tim Benson (jewellery), West African masks; New Guinea pottery.
- 1972, 31 May – 24 June: Robert Boynes, Helge Larsen, Darani Lewers
- 1972, 28 June – 22 July: Victor Vasarely, Michael McKinnon, Clifford Frith, John Hansen
- 1973, 8 February – 3 March: Drawing exhibition I - Australian artists born before 1930, including "Ringer, 1972" by Russell Drysdale.
- 1973, 7–31 March: Drawing exhibition II - Australian artists born after 1930
- 1973, July: Roger Kemp solo
- 1973, 24 October – 24 November: Sculpture survey: including small sculptures at Realities and large sculptures at Como Gardens, Como Avenue, South Yarra with 8-page catalogue
- 1973: Grant Mudford
- 1974, April: Mark Strizic, Realities 74, photographs
- 1974, 2–18 May: Mirka Mora, Erotic Drawings and Figures
- 1974, from 1 October: Old master drawings, watercolours and prints
- 1974: John Robinson: Paintings and screenprints

=== At Jackson Street ===
- 1975: Roger Kemp
- 1975, 1 October – 1 November: Sculpture survey: 500 BC - 1973 AD
- 1976: David Aspden
- 1977, 24 February – 23 March: Drawing exhibition, including John Perceval, Noel Counihan, Arthur Boyd, Mirka Mora.
- 1977: John Robinson, Paintings
- 1977: Clifton Pugh
- 1977: Inge King
- 1977, from 9 August: Paintings by the desert tribes of Central Australia and carvings by the Tiwi tribe of Bathurst and Melville Islands
- 1977, 26 October – 18 November: 19th and 20th century prints from P. & D. Colnaghi, Ltd, London, with 11 page illustrated catalogue
- 1978, 2–29 March: Frank Hodgkinson
- 1978, 4 May – 2 June: Selected fine prints from 1860-1910 from the Impressionist period to the beginning of Art Nouveau, from David Tunick, Inc., New York, USA, with catalogue of 13 pages.
- 1978, from 25 April: Artists' choice at Realities, organised by the Green Hills Foundation Limited with proceeds to Aboriginal education programs conducted by The Foundation.
- 1978, March: Donald Friend
- 1978: Baldessin Memorial Exhibition
- 1978, 5–28 October: Exhibition of old master drawings, watercolours and prints from Thos. Agnew & Sons Ltd., London
- 1979, April: Noel Counihan
- 1979: Clarice Beckett Retrospective
- 1979, 28 June – 21 July: Selected modern prints from 1905-1955 from David Tunick, Inc., New York, USA.
- 1979, 9 August – 15 September: Pre-Columban art of Mexico
- 1979: Asher Bilu Infinities
- 1979, Klaus Zimmer: Realities Gallery window installation

=== Under the direction of Pauline Wrobel ===
- 1980, 6 May – 14 June: Group exhibition with Rick Amor, Asher Bilu, Robert Boynes, Noel Counihan, Frank Hodgkinson, Gil Jamieson, Roger Kemp, Sandra Leveson, John Money, Ross Moore, Mirka Mora, Trevor Nickolls, Clifton Pugh, John Roninson, Andrew Sibley, Edwin Tanner, Robin Wallace-Crabbe, John Wolseley.
- 1980, from 24 November: Aboriginal bark paintings, Tiwi poles and carvings and Yirrkala carvings, including "Mimi spirits and Namorodo spirits" by George Djayhngurru, Oenpelli and "Bima and Waijai bird" by Paddy Henry Tiempi, Bathurst Island.
- 1980: Mike Green
- 1981: Leigh Weiner photographs
- 1981: David Aspden
- 1981: Clifton Pugh and Frank Hodgkinson. Arnhem Land series.
- 1981, from 1 December: Summer exhibition. John Money, John Wolseley, Mirka Mora, Inge King, John Robinson, Gareth Sansom, Colin Lanceley, Brian Dunlop, Frank Hodgkinson, Roger Kemp, Noel Counihan, Brett Whiteley.
- 1982, 1–26 March: Lloyd Rees
- 1982: Gareth Sansom
- 1982, June–July: Anthony Pryor
- 1982: John Robinson, Paintings
- 1982: David Aspden
- 1983: Print exhibition with "The Bodford Terrace Folio" by various print makers, John Brack, Noel Counihan (Images of Opoul), John Courier, Jeffrey Makin, Colin Lanceley, John Money, Brian Dunlop, Leonard French, Frank Hodgkinson, Robert Jacks, Roger Kemp, Les Kossatz, Jan Senbergs, John Olsen, Andrew Sibley, Lloyd Rees (New lithographs 1982), John Robinson, Andrew Southal, Fred Williams.
- 1983: Garet Sansom
- 1983: David Aspden
- 1983: Jon Cattapan, Paintings, Constructions And Works On Paper
- 1984: Jeffrey Makin, Ash Wednesday series
- 1984: John Robinson, Paintings, Drawings
- 1984: Selected Works
- 1984 Terry Matassoni: Recent Paintings
- 1985: Mike Green
- 1985: Kerry Gregan
- 1985: John Beard
- 1985: Realities Salutes, Prints by Australian Artists
- 1985: Roar Studios artists, Raw Reality
- 1986: Joyce Evans, But I Know What I Like, photographs
- 1986: Terry Matassoni: Paintings and Gouaches
- 1986: David Aspden
- 1986: Kerry Gregan
- 1986: John Robinson, Paintings, Drawings
- 1987, September–October: Anthony Pryor
- 1987: Kerry Gregan
- 1987, November: Bill Henson: Untitled 1985-86
- 1988, 3–21 December: Selected original prints exhibition by Noel Counihan, John Brack, Fred Williams, Roger Kemp.
- 1988, 10 June – 7 July: Group exhibition
- 1988: Rachel Rovay, Once Upon a Time
- 1988, October–November: Paul Partos, Calendar Paintings
- 1988: Mike Green
- 1988: David Aspden
- 1989: Terry Matassoni: Paintings and Works on Paper
- 1989: John Robinson, Paintings, Lithographs
- 1989: Jeffrey Makin
- 1989: Bill Henson, Untitled 1987-88
- 1990: Terry Matassoni: Works on Paper
- 1990: Peter Horak
- 1990, September: Anthony Pryor
- 1990, October: John Beard
- 1991: Terry Matassoni: Recent Work
- 1991: John Robinson, Survey Exhibition 1979 - 1991
- 1991: 17 August – 5 September: Jennifer Marshall, paintings
- 1991: Bill Henson, Paris Opera Project
- 1991, November: Anthony Pryor
- 1991: Jeffrey Makin
- 1992, 7–26 March Selected prints exhibition.
- 1992: Kerry Gregan
- 1992, 12–27 June: A tribute to Anthony Pryor
- 1992: Terry Matassoni: Recent Work’
