= Beyond Reason =

Beyond Reason may refer to:

- Beyond Reason (1970 film), an Australian feature film
- Beyond Reason (TV series) (1977–80), a Canadian television quiz show
- Beyond Reason (1977 film), an American feature film
- Beyond Reason (1995 film), directed by Jim O'Brien
- Beyond Reason (book), a book by Margaret Trudeau

== See also ==
- Love Beyond Reason, an album by Randy Stonehill
