= Giorgio Mangiamele =

Italian/Australian film director

- Born: 13 August 1926; Catania, Sicily
- Died: 13 May 2001
- Occupations: Film director, screenwriter, cinematographer, actor and photographer
- Years active: 1953–2001

Giorgio Mangiamele (13 August 1926 – 13 May 2001) was an Italian/Australian photographer and filmmaker who made a unique contribution to the production of Australian art cinema in the 1950s and 1960s. His films included Il Contratto (or The Contract) (1953), The Spag (1962), Ninety Nine Per Cent (1963) and Clay (1965). Clay was selected for competition at the Cannes Film Festival in 1965.

In 2011 the National Film and Sound Archive of Australia restored four of his most notable films and Ronin Films released them on DVD. Three of the films also screened at the 2011 Melbourne International Film Festival.

== Early life ==
Mangiamele, born in Catania, Sicily on 13 August 1926, was the son of a toymaker. He enjoyed drawing and painting as a child but bought his first still camera after he decided that 'painting was too slow' and that cameras were able to catch 'that fraction of a second'. After leaving school he studied fine arts in Catania and joined the State Police in Rome. As a police stills photographer for the Polizia Scientifica (Police Forensics), he captured images of crime scenes including fingerprints. He also learned the essentials of filmmaking by shooting 16mm surveillance footage of demonstrations and riots intended for screening to magistrates in court. During his fifth year with the police, Mangiamele studied journalism at Rome University, 'learning to see the essentials, to use the minimum of words', a principle he was to apply to his Australian filmmaking.

In 1952 Mangiamele boarded the Castel Felice to migrate to Australia.

== Career ==
Influenced by Bicycle Thieves (1948), Mangiamele directed and appeared in his first feature film, Il Contratto, on a £500 budget. The story tells of the challenges faced by four Italian migrants after their arrival to Australia, and was based on the stories that Mangiamele had heard from the Melbourne Italian community around him. The film was shot without sound on 16mm stock with the intention of adding an Italian-language soundtrack later. But Il Contratto was never completed and the version that survives is a mute rough cut.

Subsequent films included The Brothers (1958) and two versions of The Spag (1962). The released version of The Spag won an Honourable Mention in the 1962 AFI Awards, the judges calling it 'a remarkable attempt at creative filmmaking'.

The 47-minute Ninety Nine Per Cent (1963) was Mangiamele's only comedy and the last of his films to deal with migrant themes. Ninety Nine Per Cent blends the influences of Italian stage farce and the knockabout comedy of silent era and silent-influenced films including the 1940s–1960s features of French director-actor Jacques Tati.

Next came the feature-length Clay (1965). Costing £10,750, it was shot over a seven-week period at the Montsalvat artists' colony in the Melbourne suburb of Eltham. Clay employed a mixture of Australian and European-born actors in a story of a man on the run from police who falls in love with the woman who shelters him. Mangiamele mortgaged his home and studio to make the film, and eight of its actors and technicians contributed to the budget by agreeing to accept payment when the film moved into profit.

In 1965 Clay was chosen for competition at the Cannes Film Festival, where it was acclaimed for its visual potency. The film won the Silver Award, the Silver Medallion and Kodak Silver Trophy at the 1965 AFI Awards. Following Clay's commercial disappointment, Giorgio Mangiamele didn't make another film until Beyond Reason (1970), which did not receive commercial acceptance.

Mangiamele continued to earn a living as a portrait and event photographer, and worked as a cinecameraman for Tim Burstall, shooting 13 episodes of the Sebastian the Fox (1963) TV series, and documentaries on the artworks of Gil Jamieson and Matcham Skipper. He travelled to New Guinea in June 1979 and until 1982 made five documentaries on contract to the Papua New Guinea Office of Information. These films were promotional as well as educational, with one, Sapos (1982), being made in PNG pidgin language. During this time Mangiamele also trained a PNG crew in all aspects of filmmaking, forming the basis of an ongoing PNG government film unit.

Mangiamele always planned to make more films and he worked as a stills photographer and screenwriter, doing occasional lectures for film courses until he was diagnosed with motor neurone disease in 2000. He died on 13 May 2001.

== Personal life ==
Mangiamele met his first wife, Dorotea Hofmann (born 20 May 1922, in Leipzig, Germany), at the Rushworth Migrant Camp in Victoria after migrating to Australia in 1952. They had two daughters, Suzanne and Claudia. They couple divorced in 1977.

Mangiamele married occupational therapist (and later, abstract painter) Rosemary Cuming (born 19 October 1943, in Melbourne) in New Guinea in 1979, a year after they first met in Carlton. He is the grandfather of Australian record producer Gabriel Gleeson (known professionally as Indian Summer).

== Filmography ==
- The Contract (1953) (short)
- Unwanted (1955)
- The Brothers (1958) (short)
- Sebastian the Fox (1960) (TV) – photography
- The Spag (1962)
- Ninety-Nine Per Cent (1963)
- The Boys in the Age of Machines (1964)
- Clay (1965)
- Beyond Reason (1970)
- Sapos (1979–82)
