= Marciano =

Marciano is both a surname and a given name. It originates from Latin Marcianus or Marcian (Saint Marcians) or "Martians" or Martianus. Also from the cult of Roman god Mars.

Notable people with the name include:

Surname:

- David Marciano, American actor
- Elizeu Ferreira Marciano, Brazilian footballer
- Enzo Marciano, Italian conductor, composer, and organist
- Joey Marciano, American baseball player
- Luella Marciano, Northern Mariana Islander politician and educator
- Noa Marciano, Israeli soldier and hostage
- Ofir Marciano, Israeli footballer
- Paul Marciano, Moroccan fashion designer, and co-founder of Guess? Inc
- Rob Marciano, American journalist and meteorologist
- Rocky Marciano, Heavyweight boxing champion of the world from 9/23/1952 to 11/30/1956
- Rosario Marciano, Venezuelan classical pianist, musicologist, and teacher
- Saadia Marciano, Israeli social activist and politician, and founder of the Israeli Black Panthers
- William Marciano (born 1947), American theoretical physicist
- Yoram Marciano, Israeli politician

Given name:

- Marciano Bruma, Dutch footballer
- Marciano Cantero, Argentine singer and musician
- Marciano Guzman, Filipino poet, philosopher, and certified public accountant
- Marciano José do Nascimento, Brazilian footballer
- Marciano Saldías, Bolivian footballer
- Marciano Sanca, Bissau-Guinean footballer
- Marciano Vink, Dutch footballer
