= Leigh Wiener =

American photojournalist (1929–1993)

Leigh A. Wiener
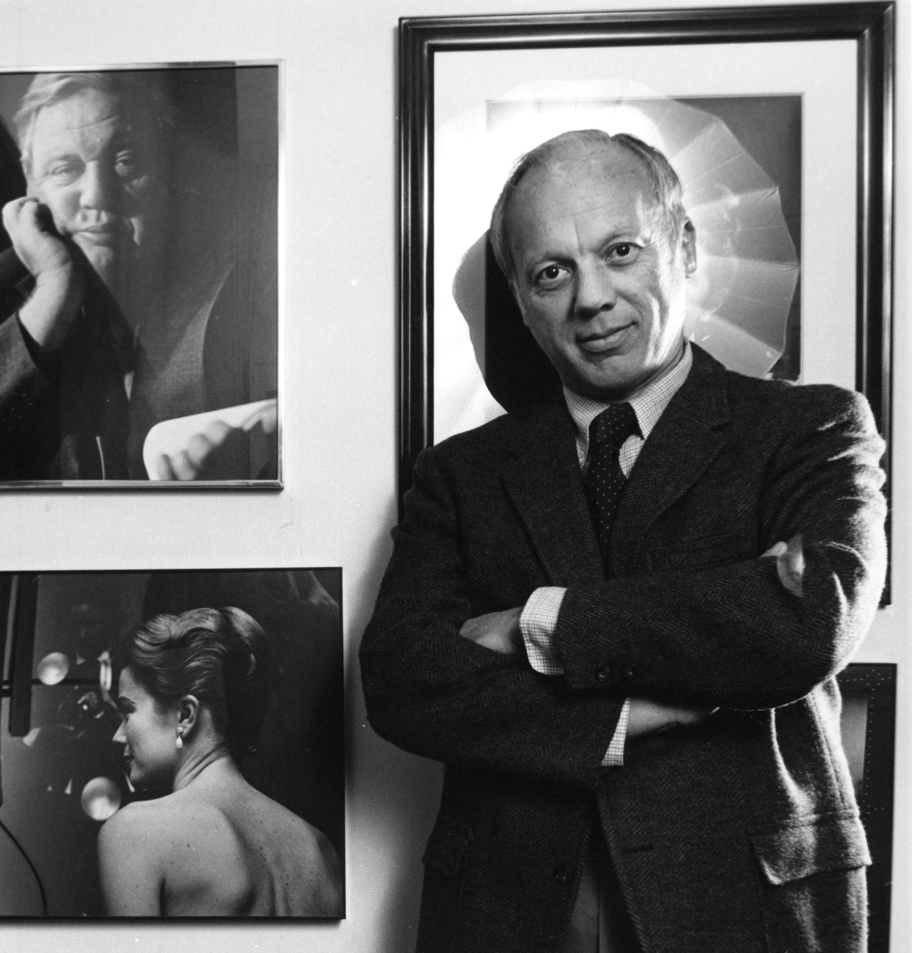
- Born: August 25, 1929; New York, New York
- Died: May 11, 1993 (aged 63); Los Angeles, California
- Occupations: Photographer, Photojournalist
- Spouse: Joyce Walker-Wiener
- Children: Devik H. Wiener
- Writing career
- Notable awards: Emmy Award
- Website: leighwiener.com

Leigh Austen Wiener (August 25, 1929 – May 11, 1993) was an American photographer and photojournalist. In a career that spanned five decades, he covered hundreds of people and events. His images captured the public and private moments of entertainers, musicians, artists, authors, poets, scientists, sports figures, politicians, industrialists, and heads of state, including every U.S. president from Harry Truman to Ronald Reagan and illustrated every sector of industry including farming, steel mills, auto manufacturing, aerospace, medicine, research, early computing and semi-conductor manufacturing.

== Biography ==
Leigh A. Wiener was born in New York City to Grace and Willard Wiener. Wiener's lifelong love of cameras and photography began at an early age. Willard Wiener was a newspaper man who frequently brought family friend and colleague Arthur Fellig—the news photographer better known as Weegee—to the house for Sunday dinner. Felig always had a packet of his latest pictures with him which he would lay out, asking a young Leigh for his opinion. By the age of 14, Wiener sold his first commercial photograph to Collier’s Weekly.

In 1946, he moved to Los Angeles. While attending UCLA, where he majored in Political Science, Wiener also worked as a news photographer for The Los Angeles Times. After college, he joined the Times as a staff photographer, but his years there were interrupted by military service in Europe as an Army photographer for Stars and Stripes.

=== Career turning point ===
On April 8, 1949, in San Marino, California, three-year-old Kathy Fiscus, while playing in a field with three other children, fell down an abandoned well, only fourteen inches wide, and became wedged ninety-seven feet below the ground.

Arriving on the scene, Wiener came upon hundreds of other newspeople, photographers, and television crews. Believing there was little else at the scene that could be photographed, Wiener left the field and walked to the Fiscus home. There in the rear yard, using his 4x5 Speed Graphic, he photographed the child's empty swing.

Returning to the scene, Wiener waited along with everyone else. Despite the efforts of the rescue teams to reach her, Kathy's lifeless body was brought up two days later. Subsequently, Wiener's powerful photograph of the child's empty swing was used on the front page of over 150 newspapers nationwide.

== Work ==
During his decades-long career as a photographer and photojournalist, Wiener consistently produced front-page pictures and photo essays for the world's most prestigious newspapers and news magazines such as Life, Paris-Match, Fortune, Time, The Saturday Evening Post and Sports Illustrated.

Wiener formed his own company in 1958. He became noted for his innovative combination of cameras and lenses; setups he designed himself to achieve the images he desired.

In many ways, innovation is a photographer's lifeblood. He has an idea and wants to obtain a certain look. Just because there is no ready-made equipment available doesn't mean you can't develop the idea. Make it yourself. Sometimes innovation doesn't require special hardware or equipment; it might just involve a different method of lighting or a new technique. Try it. The worst that can happen is that you fail. On the other hand, there can be the excitement of success. It is no accident that great photographers are also great innovators.

When photographing people, Wiener had the keen ability to capture the context of the moment while focusing squarely on the subject, inherently isolating the essential from the non-essential; the emotional state of the subject at the precise moment of the shutter-click expressed. This was the hallmark of his work.

"For this reason, the photographs are not only significant records of celebrities and other important people, at critical moments in history, but more especially, they offer the interested student a glimpse into the human psyche. They tell us something about people and what it means to be alive."

— Armand Labbe, Chief Curator, Bowers Museum

On assignment for Life during the 1960 presidential primaries he would capture iconic images of John F. Kennedy and Lyndon B. Johnson. He extensively documented Kennedy's bid for the presidency when the senator retained him to record his campaign. Wiener traveled with Kennedy on the campaign trail through the Pacific Northwest.

He later expanded into the world of TV documentaries. The Eddy Award-winning “A Slice of Sunday” was his 1967 production on professional football shot with camera-optical systems of his own design. It would serve as the prototype for many of the sports programs on network television in the years to follow such as The NFL Today. In 1979, the Motion Picture Editors Guild recognized it as one of the three most innovative documentaries in the prior 25 years of broadcasting.

In 1975, Wiener created and produced the Emmy award-winning NBC-TV series “Talk About Pictures.” He co-hosted the program with George Fenneman. The series featured an eclectic cross-section of photographers and photo enthusiasts exploring photographs and photography. Guests included professionals such as Ansel Adams, Alfred Eisenstaedt, Edmund Teske, and Mario Casilli and buffs such as Edgar Bergen, Betty White, Richard Chamberlain, David Cassidy and Bob Crane.

In considering the decisive moment, he said:

Since the beginning of time, there has never been a decisive moment—or an indecisive moment, for that matter, as I told the film producer Dore Schary. Moments are like minutes and hours, days and weeks: one just follows another. It is people who are decisive or indecisive; not the moments in time. As a photographer, you created the image. You decide when to release the shutter. You, the photographer, are the decisive element in the taking of the photograph, not some hyped-up moment. Your sensitivity and your understanding of the subject matter, and your point of view, will determine whether your photograph is decisive or not.

In 1987 he was selected by the Vatican to photograph Pope John Paul II's visit to Los Angeles during his trip to the United States.

He produced nine books including Here Comes Me, Marilyn: A Hollywood Farewell; The Death and Funeral of Marilyn Monroe, How Do You Photograph People?, and Tijuana Sunday.

Wiener's work has been spotlighted in photographic art circles, viewed in solo and group exhibitions in museums and galleries across the U.S. Four of his photographs – of Sandy Koufax, Willie Mays, President John F. Kennedy, and Sidney Poitier — were acquired by the National Portrait Gallery in Washington.

He taught classes in photography at UCLA, and held lectures and seminars in the U.S. and abroad.

== Death ==
Leigh Wiener died on May 11, 1993, in Los Angeles after suffering a long illness. His obituary published in The New York Times following his death, described him as photographer of the famous and historic. He died from complications of Sweet's syndrome, a skin disease. His doctors attributed the disease possibly to radiation exposure he received while photographing atomic isotopes and atomic bomb tests in the Nevada-Utah desert and in the Pacific after World War II for Life magazine.

== Bibliography ==
- 1966: Here Comes Me, Odyssey Press
- 1969: Not Subject To Change, IBM Corporation
- 1982: How Do You Photograph People, The Viking Press
- 1986: Limited Edition Portfolio on Poet William Everson, Murray J. Smith/The Dawson's Book Shop
- 1987: Leigh Wiener: Portraits, 7410 Publishing, Inc.
- 1989: Tijuana Sunday, 7410 Publishing, Inc.
- 1990: Marilyn: A Hollywood Farewell, 7410 Publishing, Inc.
- 2006: Johnny Cash: Photographs by Leigh Wiener, Five Ties Publishing
- 2012: Alcatraz: The Last Day, Golden Gate National Parks Conservancy

== Books containing his works ==
- 1964: Industrial Design: Volume 5, by Henry Dreyfuss
- 1965: The Drug Takers, Time-Life Books
- 1968: The Selected Letters of Robinson Jeffers, by Ann Ridgeway and Leigh Wiener, The Johns Hopkins Press
- 1969: UCLA on The Move, by Andrew Hamilton and John B. Jackson, The Ward Ritchie Press
- 1973: The Best of LIFE, Time Inc.
- 1975: LIFE Goes To The Movies, Time Inc.
- 1975: Rainbow, by Christopher Finch, Grosset & Dunlap
- 1976: Violence and Aggression, by Ronald H. Bailey, Time-Life Books
- 1977: The Double Ax, by Robinson Jeffers, Liveright
- 1977: Dear Judas and Other Poems by Robinson Jeffers, by Robinson Jeffers, Liveright
- 1977: The Women at Point Sur and Other Poems, by Robinson Jeffers, Liveright
- 1982: Judy and Liza, by James Spada, Doubleday and Co., Inc.
- 1983: The Cliffs of Solitude, by Robert Zaller, Cambridge University Press
- 1985: Jubal Sackett, by Louis L'Amour, Bantam Books
- 1987: Robinson Jeffers, by Unterjochte Erde, R. Piper Gmb.H & Co.
- 1987: Robinson Jeffers, Poet, by Robert J. Brophy
- 1987: Fine Printing: The Los Angeles Tradition, by Ward Ritchie
- 1987: Masters of Starlight: Photographers in Hollywood, by David Fahey and Linda Rich
- 1988: Photography For The Art Market, by Kathryn Marx, Amphoto
- 1988: William Everson: The Life of Brother Antoninus by Lee Bartlett, A New Directions Book
- 2000: One Man's Eye: Photographs from the Alan Siegel Collection, Word Wise Press
- 2002: A Life in the Golden Age of Jazz: A Biography of Buddy DeFranco, by Fabrice Zammarchi and Sylvie Mas, Parkside Publications, Inc.
- 2007: Frank Sinatra: My Way Of Life, Sinatra Society of Japan, Dank
- 2008: This Side of Paradise, Jennifer A. Watts and Claudia Bohn-Spector, Merrell
- 2009: Los Angeles: Portrait of a City, by David L. Ulin and Kevin Starr, TASCHEN
- 2009: Against The Eternal Yesterday: Essays Commemorating The Legacy Of Lion Feuchtwanger, Figueroa Press
- 2011: Dennis Hopper: Photographs 1961–1967, by Dennis Hopper, Victor Bockris, Walter Hopps, Jessica Hundley, Tony Shafrazi, TASCHEN
- 2014: Hollywood Digs: An Archaeology of Shadows, by Ken LaZebnik, Kelly's Cove Press

== Exhibitions ==
- 1975: Ray Cummings Gallery
- 1975: Gallery On The Plaza, The New England Institute of Art, Brookline, MA, USA
- 1977: Moody Gallery, Houston, TX, USA
- 1978: Living Room Gallery
- 1981: Realities Gallery, Melbourne, Australia
- 1983: Carol Schlosberg Gallery, Montserrat College of Art, Beverley, MA, USA
- 1985: Zeitlin & Ver Brugge Gallery, Los Angeles, CA, USA
- 1986: Irvine Fine Arts Center, Irvine, CA, USA
- 1987: Downey Museum of Art, Downey, CA, USA
- 1987: Witkin Gallery, New York, NY, USA
- 1987: Valerie Miller Gallery
- 1987: California State University at Long Beach Gallery, Long Beach, CA, USA
- 1987: Santa Barbara Museum of Art, Santa Barbara, CA, USA
- 1987: Arpel Gallery, Santa Barbara, CA, USA
- 1987: Zeitlin & Ver Brugge Gallery, Los Angeles, CA, USA
- 1987: Bowers Museum, Santa Ana, CA, USA
- 1988: California State University at Long Beach Gallery, Long Beach, CA, USA
- 1998: The Craig Krull Gallery, Santa Monica, CA, USA
- 2001: Academy of Motion Picture Arts and Sciences, Beverly Hills, CA, USA
- 2006: The Craig Krull Gallery, Santa Monica, CA, USA
- 2009: The Ordover Gallery at the San Diego Museum of Natural History, San Diego, CA, USA
- 2010: Monroe Gallery, Santa Fe, NM, USA
- 2013: Alcatraz Island, San Francisco, CA, USA

== Group exhibitions - partial listing ==
- 1987: Museum of The Borough of Brooklyn, Brooklyn College, Brooklyn, NY, USA
- 1988: Los Angeles County Museum of Art, Los Angeles, CA, USA
- 1988: University of Judaism, Los Angeles, CA, USA
- 1988: The Art Institute of Boston, Boston, MA, USA
- 1997: The Witkin Gallery, New York City, NY USA
- 2008: The Huntington, San Marino, CA, USA
- 2009: Musée de l'Élysée, Lausanne, Switzerland
- 2009: Cité de la Musique, Paris, France
- 2010: Musée Nicéphore Niépce, Chalon-sur-Saône, France
- 2010: Montreal Museum of Fine Arts, Montreal, Canada
- 2011: Serviço Social do Comércio de São Paulo, Brazil
- 2012: Santa Barbara Museum of Art, Santa Barbara, CA USA
- 2014: Annenberg Space for Photography, Los Angeles, CA USA
- 2015: Forest Lawn Museum, Los Angeles, CA USA

== Notable subjects ==
=== Entertainment ===
- Dame Judith Anderson
- Ed Asner
- Fred Astaire
- Lucille Ball
- Warren Beatty
- Jack Benny
- Milton Berle
- Joey Bishop
- Ray Bolger
- Victor Borge
- Ernest Borgnine
- Marlon Brando
- George Burns
- Sid Caesar
- Imogene Coca
- Joan Collins
- Richard Crenna
- Tony Curtis
- Marion Davies
- Bette Davis
- Sammy Davis Jr.
- Angie Dickinson
- Walt Disney
- Patty Duke
- Jimmy Durante
- Linda Evans
- George Fenneman
- Errol Flynn
- Lynn Fontanne
- John Forsythe
- Redd Foxx
- Judy Garland
- George Gobel
- Sam Goldwyn
- Frank Gorshin
- Robert Guillaume
- Bob Hope
- Rock Hudson
- Mahalia Jackson
- David Janssen
- Carolyn Jones
- Danny Kaye
- Grace Kelly
- Don Knotts
- Bruce Lee
- Jack Lemmon
- Hal Linden
- Alfred Lunt
- Lee Majors
- Lee Marvin
- Groucho Marx
- Roddy McDowall
- Marilyn Monroe
- Elizabeth Montgomery
- Paul Newman
- Rudolf Nureyev
- Maureen O'Hara
- Ryan O'Neal
- Geraldine Page
- Mary Pickford
- Sidney Poitier
- Carl Reiner
- Don Rickles
- Ginger Rogers
- Mickey Rooney
- Pat Sajak
- Simone Signoret
- Red Skelton
- Barbara Stanwyck
- Jimmy Stewart
- Elizabeth Taylor
- Shirley Temple
- Danny Thomas
- Marlo Thomas
- Jerry Van Dyke
- Robert Wagner
- Jack L. Warner
- Billy Wilder
- Flip Wilson
- Jonathan Winters
- Shelley Winters
- Natalie Wood
- Darryl Zanuck

=== Music ===
- Gene Autry
- Big Miller (Clarence Horatius Miller)
- Blood, Sweat & Tears
- Ray Bolger
- Tommy Boyce
- The Brothers Four
- Les Brown
- Oscar Brown
- Budapest String Quartet
- Glen Campbell
- Diahann Carroll
- Johnny Cash
- David Cassidy
- Carlos Chávez
- The Clancy Brothers
- The Collins Kids
- Ray Conniff
- Sam Cooke
- Robert Craft
- Bing Crosby
- Bobby Darin
- John Davidson
- Miles Davis
- Sammy Davis, Jr.
- Dukes of Dixieland
- Jimmy Durante
- Duke Ellington
- Cass Elliot
- Dale Evans
- The Everly Brothers
- Percy Faith
- Pete Fountain
- Judy Garland
- Bobby Goldsboro
- Robert Goulet
- Chico Hamilton
- Bobby Hart
- Freddie Hart
- Joey Heatherton
- Don Ho
- Billie Holiday
- Mahalia Jackson
- Dr. Mantle Hood
- Bruce Johnston
- Al Jolson
- Shirley Jones
- Tom Jones
- Janis Joplin
- Kessler Twins
- Kimberleys
- The King Family
- Frankie Laine
- The Lennon Sisters
- The Mamas & the Papas
- Rose Maphis
- Dean Martin
- Johnny Mathis
- Guy Mitchell
- Joni Mitchell
- Jim Nabors
- Ricky Nelson
- The Los Angeles Philharmonic
- Michelle Phillips
- Cole Porter
- André Previn
- Lou Rawls
- The Righteous Brothers
- Roy Rogers
- John Sebastian
- Ravi Shankar
- Bobby Sherman
- Dinah Shore
- Frank Sinatra
- Nancy Sinatra
- Isaac Stern
- Kaye Stevens
- Igor Stravinsky
- The Turtles
- Art Van Damme
- Bruno Walter
- Andy Williams
- Frankie Yankovic

=== Politics ===
- Pat Brown
- Dwight Eisenhower
- Barry Goldwater
- Lyndon Johnson
- John F. Kennedy
- Robert F. Kennedy
- Richard Nixon
- Sam Rayburn
- Nelson Rockefeller
- Eleanor Roosevelt
- Pierre Salinger
- Adlai Stevenson
- Harry Truman
- Sam Yorty

=== Art/literature ===
- Marc Chagall
- Norman Cousins
- Christopher Isherwood
- Robinson Jeffers
- Louis L'Amour
- Norman Mailer
- Carl Sandburg
- Upton Sinclair
- Irving Wallace
- Jake Zeitlin

=== Sports ===
- Muhammad Ali
- Jim Brown
- Otis Chandler
- Don Drysdale
- Leo Durocher
- Sandy Koufax
- Willie Mays
- O. J. Simpson
- Y. A. Tittle

=== Industry ===
- Albert V. Casey, publisher of the Los Angeles Times
- Stuart Davis, CEO, Great Western Savings
- Henry Dreyfuss, industrial designer
- J. Paul Getty, industrialist
- Louis Lundborg, chairman, Bank of America
- Dr. Linus Pauling, chemist; peace activist
- Norton Simon, chairman, Hunt Foods; industrialist
- Ted Turner, media mogul

== See also ==
Saxon, W., "Leigh Wiener, 62, Photographer Of the Famous and the Historic", New York Times, May 14, 1993

Oliver, M., "Leigh A. Wiener; Nationally Known Photographer", Los Angeles Times, May 14, 1993

Ride, P., "Obituary: Leigh Wiener", The Independent, May 22, 1993

"Living Memories From The Last Days Of Alcatraz", National Public Radio, March 31, 2013

Freedman, Wayne, "Alcatraz Marks 50 Years Since Closure", KGO-TV, March 21, 2013
