= Marie Hagerty =

Australian artist (born 1964)

Marie Hagerty (born 1964) is an Australian artist, painter, sculptor and teacher.

== Biography ==
Hagerty was born in Sydney in 1964. After obtaining a certificate in Visual Arts, Meadowbank College of TAFE, Sydney, she moved to Canberra. In 1988 Hagerty obtained a BA in Visual Arts at the Canberra School of Art, later returning to the Institution in the 1990s to teach part-time.

Hagerty's first exhibition as an emerging artist in 1988 was reviewed by senior art critic for the Canberra Times, Sasha Grishin. He found the exhibition Marie Hagerty: Paintings "full of energy and mischievous wit" but identified the work as that of a recent graduate. The figurative works were painted with emotion and Grishin found some of the more successful paintings "powerful and moving". The exhibition included three sculptures.

In 1994, Hagerty was selected as a finalist in the Moet Chandon Travelling Exhibition. At the time of her selection, she referred to her creative inspirations as "manipulation, Spanish artists, and the Baroque period" and in particular Velasquez.

In 1998, Sebastian Smee, art critic for the Sydney Morning Herald, reviewed Hagerty's work, discussing in particular her technical skill which she had developed through close observation of the works of the Renaissance and early Dutch painters. The sensuous, almost voluptuous forms in her works combined elements of the figurative and non-figurative, and Hagerty unusually worked in both oils and acrylics.

Hagerty was commissioned by the architects Guida Moseley Brown to design the exterior of the Peter Karmel building, an extension to the existing School of Music at the Australia National University. The building was officially opened in October 2001. Her brief was to create "a patterning and enlivening of the glazed and solid surfaces of the building's exterior in a large-scale architectural form." Hagerty said of the commission: "…The end result is a design which concentrates on planar manipulation, palette and perception of space." Hagerty's design was predominantly white, framed with black defining the first floor with large areas of red utilised on the ground floor. Hagerty said of the final design: "The massed red of painted walls and white pillars underscores the motifs above and unifies the pictorial and architectural spaces, including the entrance court".

In 2016, her exhibition Blue Blooded, curated by David Broker, at the Canberra Contemporary Art Space was one of the Canberra Times art critic Peter Haynes's top five art picks for the year. In discussing what he regarded as a "standout exhibition" Haynes referred to Hagerty's talents and found her work "powerfully incisive and aesthetically beautiful". The Canberra Contemporary Art Space website has a short description of Blue Blooded found they were reminded of "Modigliani’s voluptuousness stripped of figurative connotation" and that Hagerty's "luxurious overlay of form and virtuoso use of colour is paradoxically best described as sculptural, and calls to mind the organic abstraction of Jean Arp".

In 2018 Hagerty was made Canberra Capital Arts Patrons' Organisation (CAPO) Fellow for 2018–19. The Fellowship Award was "to mount an exhibition of her paintings at Olsen Gruin Gallery, New York, as well as pursuing a new development in her practice incorporating assemblage".

== Awards ==
- 1994: Finalist, Moet Chandon Travelling Exhibition.
- 2003: Winner, Canberra Art Prize
- 2004: Joint winner of the John McCaughey Memorial Prize.
- 2005: Wynne Prize finalist
- 2006: Wynne Prize finalist
- 2007: Wynne Prize finalist
- 2008–09: ANU School of Art Schloss Haldenstein residency in Switzerland
- 2018: Canberra Capital Arts Patrons' Organisation (CAPO) Fellow for 2018–19.
- 2019: shortlisted for the Guirguis New Art Prize, a national acquisitive art prize at the Art Gallery of Ballarat.
