= John McCaughey Prize =

Australian art prize

The John McCaughey Prize, also known as the John McCaughey Memorial Art Prize, McCaughey Prize, McCaughey Art Prize or McCaughey Art Award, is an Australian art prize awarded to an artist or artists, under which the National Gallery of Victoria and the Art Gallery of New South Wales acquire work by the winning artist.

The John McCaughey Memorial Prize was instituted by Mona McCaughey in 1957, to commemorate her father John, an Irish-born pastoral industry investor who had died in Sydney on 20 June 1928. John was the younger brother of Sir Samuel McCaughey, also a pastoralist.

Two prizes were established, one in Melbourne (administered through the National Gallery of Victoria) and one in Sydney (administered through the Art Gallery of New South Wales). It is awarded periodically, typically every few years. As an acquisitive prize, it enables the National Gallery of Victoria to acquire works from each of the winning artists.

The prize fund is held by the John McCaughey Memorial Prize Trust.

== Recipients ==
- 1957 (inaugural prize)
- 1958 John Perceval (John McCaughey Prize, NGV)
- 1959 or 1960 Sali Herman (John McCaughey Prize, NGV)
- 1965 Gil Jamieson
- 1966 Ian Fairweather
- 1966 Fred Williams
- 1971 Fred Williams (2nd time) NSW?
- 1971 Lloyd Rees (John McCaughey Memorial Art Prize, NGV)
- 1975 Geoffrey Proud (John McCaughey Memorial Art Prize, NGV)
- 1975 John Firth-Smith (McCaughey Memorial Prize, NGV)
- 1981 John Hopkins (artist) (John McCaughey Memorial Art Prize, NGV)
- 1983 Craig Gough (John McCaughey Memorial Art Prize, NGV)
- 1986 Ann Thomson (John McCaughey Award, AGNSW)
- 1990 Rover Thomas (John McCaughey Prize, AGNSW)
- 1991 Paul Boston (John McCaughey Memorial Prize, AGNSW)
- 1994 Ginger Riley Munduwalawala (John McCaughey Memorial Art Prize, NGV)
- 1996 Jon Cattapan (John McCaughey Memorial Art Prize, NGV)
- 1997 Gordon Bennett
- 1998 Lorna Fencer Napurrula (John McCaughey Memorial Art Prize, NGV)
- 2004 Three joint winners (John McCaughey Memorial Art Prize, NGV):
  Jan Nelson from Melbourne,
  Marie Hagerty from Canberra
  Paul Wrigley from Brisbane
- 2008 Gareth Sansom (John McCaughey Memorial Art Prize, NGV, $100,000)
- 2013 Jess Johnson, Void Game (John McCaughey Memorial Prize, NGV)
- 2020 Trenna Austin – A Desperate Ride on a Terrible Course
