= Clay (1965 film) =

1965 film

- Directed by: Giorgio Mangiamele
- Written by: Giorgio Mangiamele
- Produced by: Giorgio Mangiamele
- Starring: Janina Lebedew
- Cinematography: Giorgio Mangiamele
- Edited by: Giorgio Mangiamele
- Distributed by: Giorgio Mangiamele
- Release date: 25 August 1965
- Running time: 85 minutes
- Country: Australia
- Language: English
- Budget: £12,000

Clay is a 1965 Australian drama film directed by Giorgio Mangiamele. The film was nominated for the Golden Palm award at the 1965 Cannes Film Festival, but it lost to The Knack ...and How to Get It.

== Plot ==
Nick is a murderer on the run from the police. He finds a remote artists' colony and takes shelter there. Whilst there, he falls in love with a sculptor named Margot. When Nick is betrayed to the police by a jealous rival, Chris, Margot kills herself.

== Cast ==
- Janina Lebedew as Margot
- George Dixon as Nick
- Chris Tsalikis as Chris
- Claude Thomas as Father
- Bobby Clark as Charles
- Sheila Florance as Deaf-mute
- Lola Russell as Mary
- Cole Turnley as Businessman

== Production ==
The film was shot in 1964, with the crew consisting of Mangiamele, a camera assistant and a sound technician. The budget was raised by Mangiamele mortgaging his house and the cast contributing £200 each. Filming started in May and took six weeks, mostly at an artist's colony in Montsalvat. Lead actor Janina Lebedew had her voice dubbed by Sheila Florance.

== Release ==
Clay was the first Australian film selected for competition at the Cannes Film Festival.

In March 1965, ABC bought the TV rights for £2,600 and the film won to awards for photography at the 1965 AFIs. However it was poorly received at the Sydney Film Festival and Melbourne Film Festival and struggled to get commercial release.
