= Museum of Contemporary Art, Brisbane =

Art gallery in South Brisbane

The Museum of Contemporary Art (MOCA), incorporating the Young Artists Gallery, was a private gallery in South Brisbane that existed from 1987 to 1994. Situated in adjacent buildings in South Brisbane, MOCA's address was 164 Melbourne Street, while Young Artists Gallery's entrance was at 23 Manning Street.

The two-storey gallery was established in 1987 by accountant and art collector James Baker, guided by art dealer Ray Hughes, with the intention of focusing on contemporary Australian art. It was set as a non-commercial gallery, free to the public but with no government funding or subsidies. Sasha Grishin, senior art critic of The Canberra Times, reviewing the gallery's inaugural exhibition, compared it favourably with a contemporaneous exhibition at the Queensland Art Gallery, saying that it "wins hands down on calibre and choice". Grishin described Baker's "megalomaniac vision" of the gallery as studio space, publisher and major education centre as somewhat "unreal", but praised his success so far.

Its inaugural exhibition in August 1987, entitled Contemporary Art in Australia – A Review, featured the work 67 artists, including of Vivienne Binns, Fred Williams, Albert Tucker, Danila Vassilieff, Jan Senbergs, Ian Fairweather, Keith Looby, Robert Klippel, George Baldessin, John Brack, Davida Allen, Peter Booth, and Paul Boston.

The second exhibition, also in 1987 and accompanied by a catalogue of the same name, was Minimal Art in Australia, a major survey of minimalism.

The third exhibition, also in 1987, was a major retrospective of Queensland artist Davida Allen.

In June–July 1988, the gallery featured an exhibition entitled Hilary Boscott: Anamnesis.

The gallery published several books, as well as a monthly periodical entitled M.O.C.A. Bulletin, from September 1987 to issue 75 in May 1994.
