= Ginger Riley Munduwalawala =

Australian artist

- Born: circa 1936; Arnhem Land, Northern Territory, Australia
- Died: 1 September 2002 (aged 65–66); Borroloola, Northern Territory, Australia
- Known for: Painting
- Awards: National Aboriginal and Torres Strait Islander Art Award (1987); Alice Prize (1992); John McCaughey Memorial Art Prize (1993); National Aboriginal and Torres Strait Islander Heritage Commission Award (1993); Australia Council Fellowship (1997)

Ginger Riley Munduwalawala (c.1936 – 1 September 2002) was an Aboriginal Australian contemporary artist. He was born in South East Arnhem Land in the Northern Territory of Australia in the Limmen Bight area, 45 kilometers inland from the Gulf of Carpentaria coast. Riley was of the Marra people, with ties to other language groups in the Ngukurr region due to the Mission's inter-clan settlement. His first language was Marra, now critically endangered.

Riley was known for his distinctive landscape style and daring use of bright acrylic colors to paint the land surrounding the Limmen Bight River, situated along the Gulf of Carpentaria coast southeast of Arnhem Land—and the mythological figures who created the region. This region is Riley's mother's land, of which he served as its guardian/custodian. Adhering to Marra customs, Riley was not allowed to portray the Dreamings, or ancestral stories from his father's Marra land and therefore stuck to the song lines on his matrilineal side. The landscape of Ginger Riley's mother country includes coastal saltwater that enters the Limmen Bight River, passes through mudflats and Marra territory, and finally reaches the ravine in the middle of the Four Archers – Gurrialadagauwulu.

Riley's use of color sets him apart from many Aboriginal artists in Arnhem Land. By painting with acrylic paints on canvas, he diverged from the conventions of the more traditional Aboriginal art, restricted to natural materials sourced from the land, such as bark and ochre pigments. On his use of light and color, Riley has said "I have to see it, it mist be bright." Riley's distinctive landscapes and bright, brilliant colors defied categorization and challenged stereotypes about what represented 'authentic' Aboriginal art. His art can be seen as a fusion of 'Aboriginal' and 'contemporary.'

Through Riley's portrayal of the landscape, he tells a story of its creation and the mythical events that the Marra people believe shaped the country. Despite taking a Western perspective in his landscapes, his art still draws on spiritual traditions and places emphasis on the intimate relationship his people have with the country that surrounds them. His work is often cited in discussions about the emergence of contemporary Aboriginal art and its resistance to binary classifications like "urban" vs. "traditional.". His work exemplifies what curator Judith Ryan called a "synthesis of traditional Aboriginal thought and contemporary personal vision."

In 2002, the Australian expressionist and Riley's longterm friend David Larwill, gave Riley the moniker "The Boss of Colour," while he was nearing the end of his life due to lung cancer. The story goes that Larwill visited Riley in Melbourne, and greeted him with the words, "Ginger Riley, the boss of colour," highlighting Riley's accomplished skill of painting with radiant colors.

Riley was awarded the National Aboriginal and Torres Strait Islander Art Award in 1987, the Northern Territory's Alice Prize in 1992, John McCaughey Memorial Art Prize in 1993, the first National Aboriginal and Torres Strait Islander Heritage Art Award in 1993 and an Australia Council Fellowship for 1997/98. He was also in the Top 100 Aboriginal Artists by sales value.

His work has been exhibited nationally and internationally including at the 4th, 9th, 10th and 11th National Aboriginal Art Award, the 12th Telstra National Aboriginal Art Award, and the 13th and 14th Telstra National Aboriginal & Torres Strait Islander Art Award.

The National Gallery of Victoria held a 10-year retrospective of his work in 1997, titled Mother Country in Mind: The Art of Ginger Riley Munduwalawala. It was the first time a public institution in Australia honored a living Aboriginal artist in this way.

He developed a unique artistic style to honor and depict the landscape of Southeast Arnhem Land, for which he is the djungkayi (caretaker) and now holds native title. In July 2000, the Federal Court of Australia recognized native title rights in this region, affirming Riley's right to live on his ancestral land as a traditional owner and caretaker, further developing his artwork.

== Early life and influences ==
Ginger Riley was born c.1936 in Marra Country, in South-Eastern Arnhem Land near Ngukurr, the former territory of the Roper River Mission. In the 1950s, Riley began working as a stockman and laborer on the Nutwood Downs Station and other establishments in the Northern Territory. Riley held a number of jobs before his painting career including his work as a police warden at Larrimah, a school groundsman in Darwin, a general maintenance worker for the Numbulwar Council and as a cleaner for Gemco mines at Groot Eylandt.

During his time as a stockman, Riley met the renowned Western Aranda watercolorist, Albert Namatjira, whose art was among the first to be exhibited by an Aboriginal. This encounter left a profound impact on Riley, eventually prompting him to explore painting with acrylics three decades later. After work declined in the late 1970s following the Aboriginal Land Rights Act, he moved back to Ngukurr and began painting round 1986–87, quickly finding his style as a landscape painter. Riley utilized Namatjira's influence by recognizing the possibilities within different artistic styles. He integrated elements of Modernism and other inspirations into his traditional art. Through his artwork, Riley showcased various perspectives on Aboriginal art. One key aspect of this evolution was his exceptional use of color. Namatjira's colorful work inspired Riley to capture the colors of his mother's land, which he referred to as 'color country.' Riley has said he "saw Namatjira painting his color country," planting the seed that the colors of his mother's land that he sees in his mind can be captured and represented artistically. Upon his return home, Riley attempted to paint, yet the earthy ochre colors he used proved to be unsatisfactory in depicting the colors he saw in his imagination, leading Riley to work with acrylic paints later on.

In 1987, the Northern Territory Education Department established painting workshops in an old hospital in Ngukurr, where Riley had been residing since the late-1970s. These workshops provided access to acrylic paints and served as the catalyst for Riley's distinguished career. The art center, named "Beat Street," became a hub for extraordinary creative paintings in its first year. Alongside fellow Ngukurr artists Willie Gudabi and Djambu Barra Barra, Riley entered the Aboriginal art scene and quickly gained acclaim for his colorful landscapes and mythic narratives.

The artists working alongside Ginger Riley in Ngukurr reflected the diversity of the region traced back to the establishment of the Roper River Mission in 1908. The significant historical migration to the Roper River Mission played a pivotal role in shaping the unique style and thematic focus of art from the region. The Roper River Mission (Ngukurr) brought together diverse Aboriginal clans, creating a melting pot of artistic traditions in Ngukurr. The mission brought together clans from the surrounding regions, comprising 8 different language groups. The budding artists in Ngukurr drew upon their different stylistic traditions and iconography combined with the development of their individual creative styles.

After painting seriously for about seven years, Riley traveled to London in 1993 for the Aratjara Aboriginal art exhibition. During this visit, he saw works by Picasso and Van Gogh for the first time at the Tate Gallery and the National Gallery. Riley began signing his paintings following this visit to London where he saw signed artworks by Picasso and other artists.

In 1999, Riley reported that artworks he had not created were being sold under his name, stating that he had signed some pieces while intoxicated. The Northern Territory police investigated the matter, but no charges were filed.

== Visual Iconography ==
Riley is remembered for working with a whole visual composition, mixing and layering paint, and experimenting with different colors and effects. Riley's paintings depict his mother's country, the Limmen Bight area surrounding the Limmen Bight River and the rocky outcrop known as the Four Archers (Barrkuwiriji). His characteristic landscape style and brilliant use of color brought Riley into the spotlight as an Aboriginal artist working with contemporary mediums. Aside from the adventurous use of color, Riley's works are also characteristic of unique iconography, depicting natural and supernatural narratives which take place in the Limmen Bight area, the coastal saltwater country of the Marra people, for which he is both a traditional owner, as well as a custodian (Djungkayi).

Riley's use of colour goes beyond aesthetics, tapping into psychological and spiritual symbolism. He primarily worked with the four psychological primaries of red, blue, yellow, and green, all at full intensity. Each colour holds symbolic meaning: red often signifies the power and aggression of Garimala or Bulukbun, while blue suggests calmness, mythic time, or the depths of sea and sky. This use of colour reflects Riley's belief in the spirit-imbued nature of the landscape, and his compositions evoke not just place but presence. His intense colour contrasts, such as complementary hues of red and green or blue and yellow, enhance the spiritual tension between ancestral forces in his scenes.

Riley's technique of painting also contributes to the spiritual power of his work. He would lay the canvas flat on the ground and build the painting in layers, saying, “building up country,” just as the land itself is layered. This metaphor aligns with Aboriginal understandings of land as layered with ancestral presence and meaning. This method results in rich, glowing effects as the underpainting peeks through successive layers, contributing to the sense of a landscape that is alive and incorporating spiritual aspects.

In 1999 Riley revealed that his works follow a continuous song-line known as Gudjika. He expressed, "Gudjika is a road - a line; you cannot make it up or steal it, you must follow that line. Gudjika goes forward, never back. Gudjika is about little picture - you think this series of pictures in your mind." This song-line comes from the beginning of time, and while Riley retells his creation story over and over, using different perspectives and variations, he claims that he does not look backward, but forward. This manifested itself in the way he refused to paint on demand or produce replicas of his previous work, always ensuring his work remained fresh. His art remained a reflection of what he saw in his mind, a process of discovery in which Riley was uninterested in regurgitating past artworks or conventional formulas, instead chasing new paints, textures, and perspectives for his works. This highlights the spontaneity and adventurous nature of his artistic method, on which Riley has stated "I see me country when I wake up, think what I am going to do--sometimes one color, sometimes three." Yet within his forward creativity, Riley continues to communicate tradition.

In his paintings, Riley depicts the landscape of the land and the ancestral beings that created all of its natural features. The most prominent recurring motifs in his work include: Garimala, the snake who created the Four Archers, the Four Archers themselves, Ngak Ngak, a white breasted sea eagle, the Limmen Bight river, the ceremonial shark's liver tree, so-called because a shark gave his liver to create the tree, and additionally, clouds or sun which generally represent Riley's mother.

The Four Archers geological formation is commonly represented in Riley's work, described as "the center of the Earth, where all things start and finish." He represents the formation in a variety of different perspectives, including close-up and cut off from the surrounding flat landscape, and long-range in a singular composition where the formation is simultaneously in the foreground and background. The Four Archers formation and the sacred ceremonial rock, Ngamiyukandji, is described to be formed by the twisting and winding movements of Garimala, the creator-snake ancestor. The ceremonial rock is not painted or discussed, but is the meeting place of the kangaroo creation story that explains the population of the earth. Additionally, the kangaroo is Riley's totem.

Garimala is an important creation being who shaped the country, forming and living in the Four Archers geological formation and nearby waterhole. Garimala is the two-snake form of the supernatural King Brown snake, Bandian, of the species Pseudechis australis. When Giramala is shown as multiple snakes, it represents the meaning that he is everywhere. Bandian is often depicted as Garimala, sometimes also called Kurra Murra, a two-snake form which remains one entity. The snakes in double form are often depicted in Heraldic symmetry, arching to face one another, above the Four Archers, on either side of a shark's liver tree. In his work, Riley will sometimes depict Garimala as adopting the identity of the Rainbow Serpent, Wawalu, or the mythic fire-breathing serpent-dragon Bulukbun. The identity of the rainbow serpent, Wawalu, was adopted when Garimala travelled from the Four Archers formation to the sacred rock in the Limmen Bight River and disappeared underwater to transform. Wawalu is associated with the regeneration of the earth during the wet season, and is considered present when a rainbow is visible in the sky. In the singular form of Bulukbun, the creator-snake is an angry fire-breathing dragon, visually identified by fiery breath, a horn on his head, a forked tongue, and scaly spines that are described by Riley to raise up when he is aggressive. One story involving Bulukbun takes place on Beatrice Island during an initiation ceremony where some of the initiates misbehaved, causing Bulukbun to smell their blood. He trapped them in a cave by making it rain and killed them with his fiery breath, leaving their bones in the cave. Another story about Giramala punishing a group of youths was when they killed some flying foxes in the ravine of the Four Archers formation, causing Giramala to chase them through caverns and kill them with his fiery breath. Giramala's anger stemmed from the boys not keeping themselves hidden after their initiation, resulting in their blood being smelled.

Ngak Ngak, the white-breasted sea eagle, is another central motif in Riley's paintings. Ngak Ngak appears as a single or multiple eagles, often in profile, as a guardian being, actively looking over the country and protecting it. The sea eagle is Riley's totem who created the Yumunkuni island in the mouth of the Limmen Bight River and protects the land. Ngak Ngak is almost always painted much larger in proportion to the rest of the composition or can also be painted green in some of his artwork. Riley explained that he knew Ngak Ngak should be white, but chose green “because it looks better—more powerful.” This surprising color choice shows how Riley prefers to focus on spiritual meaning and strong feelings instead of realistic details. The sea eagle, standing out brightly against its background, becomes a symbol of protection and watching over ancestors. This also reflects his bird's eye view as the prominent perspective, exhibiting Riley's exploration of aerial perspectives to capture the land, as Ngak Ngak sees it, in flight. Ngak Ngak is also credited with creating Beatrice Island, also known as Yarramandji ("shark") by flying over the mouth of the Limmen Bight River. Yarramandji is Riley's mother's totem, deepening the connection between his artwork and his mother's country.

Riley commonly depicts the landscape as if seen from a vantage point above the clouds. This type of surveying gaze, emblematic of Ngak Ngak's viewpoint, can also be seen as a metaphor for Riley's own protective eye and responsibility, as custodian of his mother's country. This perspective is an assertion of Riley's knowledge of the land, as if he is painting a map, in which he knows all of the details, creatures, and ancestral stories. In addition to an aerial viewpoint, Riley explored multiple perspectives in one scene, combining both plan and frontal perspectives, demonstrating the different experiences of one narrative. In some paintings, the inclusion of the sun and clouds in this view can express the relationship between Riley, the sun, and his mother, the clouds. For example, in his 1993 painting Limmen Bight Country, the Story of Creation, Riley used a red sun and white cloud above Ngak Ngak to symbolize himself and his mother, further reinforcing familial and spiritual ties through colour symbolism.

The shark liver tree is another recurring figure in many of Riley's artworks, depicted alone or in multiples, and as living or dead. The shark is Riley's mother's totem, and the name of the tree results from a creation story in which the shark ancestor gives his liver to create the tree. This makes the tree a ceremonial totemic construction instead of a naturally occurring tree. The tree is sometimes depicted with eggs laid by Giramala at its base, and can sometimes be distinguished from other trees in Riley's landscapes by two guardian snakes surrounding it.

Along with the physical motifs outlined above, including the ancestral beings and natural features of the land, Riley incorporated traditional objects and designs associated with sacred ceremonies. This includes his depiction of rectangular heraldic "message sticks," or "letter sticks," Marra ritual objects decorated with zigzag patterns and dots, which are known to announce initiation ceremonies and serve as invitations to his country. Including "number seven" hooked boomerangs and spears indicates the importance of the ceremony. The heraldic message sticks are often depicted being guarded by two snakes, and sometimes by humans. More noticeable perhaps are the triangular motifs Riley used to border many of his paintings, speculated to relate to sacred ceremonial body painting designs. These message sticks were not only visual but perform communicative roles in ceremonial invitations which enhanced the sacred layers in his work.

Riley was known to lead an adventurous and independent life, contrasting the constant iconography in his works that focused on the figures and landscapes relevant to the stories of his mother's country. He was described to have a strong sense of identity as a coastal saltwater man, which served as an anchor of certainty he would return to throughout his artistic career. He represented this heritage differently in each painting to avoid repetition, and his paintings gradually became more delicate and sophisticated over time.

== Significant Exhibitions ==
In 1987, Gabrielle Pizzi, who was in the process of opening one of Australia's only galleries specializing in Aboriginal art, visited Ngukurr to select pieces for their exhibition. Opened in 1988, this was the second exhibition at the new Gabrielle Pizzi Gallery, featuring five works by Ginger Riley Munduwalawala. Ginger Riley Munduwalawala also traveled to Melbourne to attend the opening and speak about the works.

Ginger Riley Munduwalawala's works are held in the collections of several major institutions, reflecting his significance in Australian contemporary art. Notably, his work was featured in a 10-year retrospective at the National Gallery of Victoria in 1997, titled 'Mother Country in Mind: The Art of Ginger Riley Munduwalawala,' marking the first time a public institution in Australia honored a living Aboriginal artist in this way.

National Gallery of Victoria (NGV), Melbourne: Hosted a major retrospective titled Mother in Mind: The Art of Ginger Riley Munduwalawala in 1997, the first time a public institution in Australia honored a living Aboriginal artist in this way

Riley's work has also been exhibited internationally, including in the exhibition 'Porta Oberta al Dreamtime: Art Aborigen Contemporani d’Australia' at the Fundació Caixa de Girona in Spain in 2004.

Worked with William Mora at the Paddy Bedford Estate to show his individual artwork as a solo artist, unlike a representation of the Aboriginal Community.

In 1992, Riley produced a series of artworks for the new Australian Embassy building in Beijing, China.

Tyerrabarrbowaryaou II in 1994, an exhibition prepared for the Havana Biennale in Cuba.

Mother Country in Mind: The Art of Ginger Riley Munduwalawala, National Gallery of Victoria, 17 July – 22 September 1997

The exhibition Ginger Riley/Native Title, celebrating Ginger Riley Munduwalawala's victory in gaining native title rights, was held at Alcaston Gallery in Melbourne from May 18 to June 8, 2001.

Ginger Riley: The Boss of Colour, Castlemaine Art Museum, January – 19 April 2015

Country and Western: Landscape Reimagined

== See also ==
- Australian art
