= Jan Nelson =

Australian artist, photographer (born 1955)

Jan Nelson (born 1955) is an Australian artist who works in sculpture, photography and painting. She is best known for her hyper real images of adolescents. She has exhibited widely in Australia as well as Paris and Brazil. Her works are in the collections of Australian galleries, including the National Gallery of Australia, National Gallery of Victoria, Art Gallery of New South Wales, Museum of Contemporary Art, Sydney and the Gallery of Modern Art Brisbane, as well as major regional galleries. She represented Australia in the XXV biennale in São Paulo, Brazil.

== Early life and education ==
Nelson was born in Melbourne in 1955 and attended the Victorian College of the Arts, graduating in 1983.

In 2018 she completed a PhD at Deakin University, Faculty of Arts & Education, School of Communication and Creative Arts, Melbourne. Her thesis, titled Lasagna composting: strategies for painting in a digital age proposed strategies for the survival of painting in a digital age.

== Career ==
As a painter, Nelson originally explored landscape and in the 1980s focused on politics of occupations and space. Nelson produced drawings in crayon. After the mid-1980s, Nelson focused on ideas about woman's place in society, and the invisibility of women in society. Her works incorporated traditional crafts including plaster work and basket weaving.

In 1989–91 Nelson produced a series of works called The Long Century.

In her work International Behaviour (2000) she imposed a photograph of Vietnam refuges in boats on a background of vivid, psychedelic colours and patterns. In 1994, Nelson exhibited sculptures recalling the grand canyon and the Amazon jungle: simple shapes on plinths. Even then critics noted her theatricality and comment on the traditional presenting of works on plinths.

Nelson's more recent works are hyper realistic, and recall the gloss of advertising and magazine. Her works portray people between their worlds and their desires, often adolescents.

Nelson's best known series is Walking in Tall Grass, portraits of adolescents, that Nelson worked on for fifteen years, ending in 2016. Nelson began with photographing people she knew as well as strangers. She drew on the photographs for the paintings, which may combine a head, a torso and features from multiple subjects she has photographed. When she paints the portraits, Nelson adds vibrant colours and often paints reflections in eyes or sunglasses. To heighten vibrancy, Nelson has painted exhibition walls in vibrant colours. Each young adolescent is dressed and accessorized to express individuality as well as fashion at the time the painting was done. Yet each individual looks away from the viewer, suggesting they are looking inward uncertain of where they are going. In an interview, Nelson noted that when walking in tall grass you can't go back, you have to go forward, but you can't see where you are going.

== Work ==
Jan Nelson's works exploit emotional, textural and chromatic intensity, oscillating between fear and power, complacency and dissent. Layered within the artist's work is the personal experience of her own formative years during the social, political and cultural tumult of the 1970s. Nelson's multi-disciplinary practice, which encompasses painting, sculpture, photography and installation, concentrates on the role of the visual in the construction and experience of the developing self. Both alluring and disquieting, her work's dynamism stems from the artist's preoccupation with states of change.

Nelson's suggested narratives frequently involve pivotal moments, transformations and the in-between spaces in which the potential for change and transcendence operate. For instance, in the 1990s her paintings (Anticipating Transcendence, 1996 and An Ordinary Life, 1997) explored iconic tropes of modernism by refiguring the work of Yves Klein and Piero Manzoni. The series culminating in the exhibition Incident 1960, which examined issues of simulation and the relationship between painting, photography and 3D objects.

In the early 2000s Nelson began her hyperrealist, hyper coloured painting series, Walking in Tall Grass. As MCA senior curator Rachel Kent writes: 'Nelson's paintings are unapologetically representational, their subjects painted meticulously from photographs taken by the artist, rather than from studio sittings. Collectively titled Walking in Tall Grass, her works take as their subject a young person – male or female – on the cusp of adolescence. Highly individual, with distinctive features, clothing and other pieces of visual information (a pom-pom hat, badges, a particular anorak), they are one step removed from their viewer in that they are discretely turned away and do not meet the eye directly. This 'disconnect' or refusal to engage has been described by some critics as reflecting the nature of adolescence, with its solitary introspection and avoidance of adult engagement. Each portrait is singular, the figure presented against a simple, coloured background.' 'Increasingly, they are a composite of several people who are digitally combined, the head of one, the torso or arms of another, and so forth…. This subsequent step then becomes an exercise in going beyond the truth of the photograph, introducing a hyper-reality and powerful intensity of colour and emotion so that, in Nelson's words, the painting "begins to vibrate". [Further intensifying the scene Nelson often exhibits these works on] hand-painted striped gallery walls which introduces an abstract, chromatic intensity and contrast to the figuration of the canvases.

In 2013, her exhibition Strange Days grafted symbols of 1970s idealism onto Occupy Melbourne and the activities of the local environment movement. Riffing on her earlier 'bleached' cast 3D works, ... Nelson's installation continued to vibrate with the energy of 'the real' and to oscillate between the often-conflicting states of vulnerability and defiance. The three works that made up the exhibition (each 1:1 cast replicas of objects from real life) specifically came from the artist's own experience. For instance, Defiance, a rendered water barrier, meticulously detailed in shape and surface but devoid of any colour other than that of the cast, was lifted from the Occupy Melbourne protest in Melbourne's City Square, when on the 21st October the camp was barricaded by police using water barriers and cyclone fencing. Within the circle of linked barriers, one lone barrier sat abandoned inside the camp. The solitary unit, useless without its connection to its fellow barriers, becoming a potent symbol of how power is only achieved when individuals join together. This image was further galvanized as a symbol of defiance when a single graffitied tag appeared. This irreverent gesture later reconstructed by the street artist Sirum 1's Venom tag which was applied to Nelson's Defiance as a reiteration of the act of reclamation.

Importantly for Nelson the labour of the human hand is perceived as a performative act, exposing the gap between the constant striving towards perfection and the flawed reality of our idiosyncratic humanity. As she writes "as with all of my work, the meaning is contained within the process where the handmade meets acute industrial precision. Whether it is a hyper-real exact replica of a photograph or screen, an abstracted minimal rendering of stripes on a wall or the incessant manufacture of 3D objects, all are managed from a set of instructions, followed exactly to perform a kind of perfection, and more importantly, to give rise to problematising the very nature of representation. In acting out this exactness it is my aim to claim a type of witness to the anxiety and struggle of contemporary living."

== Awards and recognition ==
- 1983–1984 Australian Council for the Arts grant awarded to support her residency at the Owen Tooth Cottage, Vence, France
- 1984–1985 Australian Council for the Arts Project Grant awarded
- 1986 Artist in Residence, Victorian College of the Arts
- 2003–2004 Australia Council grant awarded
- 2004 John McCaughey Memorial Art Prize at National Gallery of Victoria
- 2009 Arthur Guy Memorial Painting Prize, Bendigo Art Gallery, for Walking in Tall Grass (Tom)

== Collections ==
- Art Gallery of New South Wales
- Bendigo Art Gallery
- Museum of Contemporary Art, Sydney
- National Gallery of Victoria
- National Gallery of Australia
- Queensland Art Gallery/Gallery of Modern Art
- Art Gallery Western Australia
- Monash University Museum of Art
- Ian Potter Museum of Art
- Heide Museum of Modern Art
