= Irma Kurtz =

American-born UK-based writer (born 1935) writer

- Born: September 3, 1935 (age 90); New Jersey, US
- Education: Barnard College, Columbia University
- Children: 1 son
- Writing career
- Notable works: Agony aunt Cosmopolitan Magazine; My Life in Agony

Irma Kurtz (born September 3, 1935) is an American-born UK-based writer and agony aunt. She has worked in that capacity for Cosmopolitan magazine for over 40 years. She lives in London's King's Cross.

== Early life ==
Born in New Jersey, United States, on September 3, 1935, Kurtz was raised in Jersey City, and spent time in New York City growing up. Her father was a dentist. She has a bachelor's degree in English literature from Columbia University.

== Career ==
=== Journalism ===
After university, Kurtz undertook the Study Abroad program, traveling to Europe in 1954 as an 18-year-old on the Castel Felice liner, an episode she recounts in Then Again: Travels in Search of My Younger Self. She returned and worked as a journalist, traveling in Europe and living in Paris, France, before settling in London, England. She worked for Nova magazine from its beginning in 1965, and joined Cosmopolitan in the United Kingdom in 1972. Kurtz also wrote for the American edition for 10 years.

Kurtz has written three self-help books, two novels and three travel books.

=== Television ===
Kurtz was the writer and presenter of Mediterranean Tales, a 10-part television series for BBC4.

== Bibliography ==
- Grand Dragon (1981)
- Loneliness (1983)
- Beds of Nails and Roses (1983)
- The Great American Bus Ride (1993)
- Dear London (1998)
- My Life in Agony: Confessions of a Professional Agony Aunt (2014)

== Personal life ==
She has a son, Marc, a television director, who is married with four children.
