= Paul Boston =

Australian artist

- Born: 1952; Melbourne, Australia
- Known for: Painting, Drawing, Works on Paper
- Awards: John McCaughey Memorial Art Prize, National Gallery of Victoria, Melbourne

Paul Boston (born 1952) is an Australian artist.

== Life and work ==
Paul Boston was born in Melbourne in 1952. While with at art school he developed an interest in Zen. After graduating, Boston travelled to Japan and South East Asia, where he spent time developing his Zen practice which informs much of his later work. Taking inspiration from Cubist and Abstract art, Boston has explored the nature of paradox in his paintings and drawings and has shown an interest in the interchangeability of form and space. Taking from his involvement with Zen practice, Boston is interested in creating a sense of the meditation experience for the viewer through his work, something he calls a contemplative presence, showing a careful consideration for tone and a refinement towards the fabrication of forms, whereby his shapes come to mean different things to different people. Boston has produced an impressive body of work that has been shown in solo exhibitions throughout Australia and in group shows in Australia and overseas. He is the recipient of a number of prizes and his work is included in the collections of all major Australian public galleries and a number of important private and corporate collections throughout the world. As of 2014 Boston lived and worked in Melbourne.

== Exhibitions ==
Throughout his 30-year career Boston has held 20 solo shows in Australia and has participated in over 45 group exhibitions in Australia and overseas. Since 1993 he has shown regularly at Niagara Galleries, Melbourne and has represented them at the Korea International Art Fair in 2010, 2011 and 2012 and at the Auckland Art Fair in 2007 and 2011. He also participated in the Melbourne Art Fair in 2002, 2004, 2006, 2010 and 2012. Boston has shown extensively across Australia as well as internationally, participating in Group Show at the David McKee Gallery and A Survey of International Painting and Sculpture at the Museum of Modern Art in New York, as well as Contemporary Australian Art to China 1988–1989 which toured from Beijing to Guangzhou. His most recent shows have included the Paul Boston Survey Exhibition: 1980–2010 at Ray Hughes Gallery, Sydney and Abstraction 10 at Charles Nodrum Gallery, Melbourne in 2011.

== Collections ==
Boston's work is represented extensively in public and private collections throughout Australia. He features in major state galleries such as the National Gallery of Australia, National Gallery of Victoria, Art Gallery of NSW, Art Gallery of Western Australia and Museum of Contemporary Art, South Brisbane, as well as regional galleries and corporate, university and private collections across Australia and overseas.

== Awards ==
Boston has won several awards throughout his career, including the National Works on Paper Award, Mornington Peninsula Regional Gallery in 2004, the John McCaughey Memorial Art Prize, National Gallery of Victoria in 1991, and the inaugural Savage Drawing Prize, Melbourne in 1987.
