= Beyond Reason (1970 film) =

- Directed by: Giorgio Mangiamele
- Written by: Oriel Gray; Robert Garlick
- Based on: a story by Giorgio Mangiamele
- Produced by: Giorgio Mangiamele
- Starring: George Dixon; Maggie Copeland; Ray Fellows; Louise Hall; Ollie Ven Skevics
- Cinematography: Giorgio Mangiamele
- Edited by: Russell Hurley
- Music by: Enzo Marciano
- Distributed by: Columbia Pictures
- Release date: 1970
- Running time: 84 minutes
- Country: Australia
- Language: English
- Budget: $130,000

Beyond Reason is a 1970 Australian post-apocalyptic drama film.

== Plot ==
Nuclear war breaks out and the staff and patients of a mental hospital take refuge in an underground bunker and accidentally get locked in. Discipline soon disintegrates and the patients, led by Richard, start to resist authority. Richard devises a scheme for a new social order where the sane will take no part. The doctors try to resist but are ultimately overcome.

== Cast ==
- George Dixon as Dr Sullivan
- Magie Copeland as Marion
- Ray Fellow as Dr De Groot
- Louise Hall as Rita
- Ollie Ven Skevics as Richard
- John Gauci
- Pat Palmer
- Robert Henderson
- Victor Pandov
- Glenda Wynack
- Tom Melvold
- Joan Hall
- Lola Russell
- Andrew Gaty

== Production ==
The film marked an attempt by Giorgia Mangiamele to make a more commercial feature than his first, being shot in colour, and using professional writers. The budget was raised by private investors and Magiamele's camera and recording equipment were sold after shooting to help pay lab charges. It was shot over three weeks in August 1968 mostly at a large underground room at the Royal Melbourne Institute of Technology.

== Release ==
Although the film obtained distribution from Columba Pictures, commercial reception was poor.

The director expressed dissatisfaction with the final product, saying that "I had no time to make the images look good. It was shot in a couple of weeks for TV."
