= Il Contratto =

- Directed by: Giorgio Mangiamele
- Starring: Giorgio Mangiamele; Luigi Borso; Giuseppe Cusato; Halina Kisilevski; Giuseppe Michelini
- Release date: 1953
- Running time: 92 minutes
- Country: Australia
- Languages: English; Italian

Il Contratto (also known as 'The Contract') is a 1953 Australian film from Giorgio Mangiamele and Italian migrants in Australia. It was completed within a year of Mangiamele's arrival in Australia from Italy.

== Plot ==
Four young single Italian men (Giuseppe Michelini, Luigi Borsi, Giuseppe Cusato, Giorgio Mangiamele) travel to Melbourne by boat. Their trip was financed by loans from a travel agency, attracted by an Australian government scheme that promises them two years' guaranteed employment. They settle in inner-city accommodation, but find it impossible to obtain work in the midst of Australia's 1952–53 recession. Together with a woman friend, the men move to a farm outside Melbourne. After some initial setbacks, they earn enough money to pay off the agency loans.

== Cast ==
- Giorgio Mangiamele
