= Jutta Feddersen =

German-born Australian fibre artist, sculptor, lecturer (1931–2021)

- Born: Jutta Schley; August 5, 1931; Briesen (Spreewald), Germany
- Died: December 19, 2021 (aged 90); Sydney
- Education: Handwerkskammer, Bremen; City Art Institute, Sydney
- Known for: Fibre art, sculpture, teacher
- Spouse: Lorenz Feddersen
- Children: Kirsten, Melanie

Jutta Feddersen (5 August 1931 Briesen –19 December 2021, Sydney) was a German-born Australian fibre artist, sculptor, lecturer.

== Early life and education ==
Born Jutta Schley in Briesen, Germany on 5 August 1931 into a prosperous farming family, Feddersen was orphaned with her four siblings during WW2. In the care of her aunt Dora Wedding they fled the Russian soldiers. Separated from her family she endured privation, typhoid and imprisonment, before she was able to rejoin them. She undertook a Diploma Fibre Art at the Handwerkskammer (Chamber of Crafts) in Bremen in 1953, and was employed as a weaver.

== Australia ==
At age 25 Feddersen made a successful application to teach hand-weaving at Sturt College, part of the Frensham School in Mittagong, Australia, departing Germany 19 Dec 1956 on the Castel Felice for a two year visit, and there met mechanic Lorenz Feddersen who had come from Germany in 1955. In 1959 they married after her return to Australia. Daughter Kirstin was born in 1963 and they revisited Germany in 1968 before the birth Melanie the following year. Jutta meanwhile worked as an occupational therapist at Concord Repatriation Hospital and in factories and the couple moved to Elanora Heights. She purchased looms and began to weave at home, marketing her ties, curtains, carpets and dresses.

Her work was exhibited in her first solo shows in 1965 and 1967 at Hungry Horse and Aladdin galleries, and at a 1971 Design Centre exhibition opened by Bernard Smith her work was described by The Sydney Morning Herald as "a free-hanging, stainless steel rope. Strands of rope fell and twirled in a parallel linear movement at once mobile yet rigid." In interview, Feddersen explained that *Actually it's fishing tackle rope. I dyed it in tar but it didn't take the tar properly, so that's why its a rather interesting brownish black. This hanging is just an example of a different use of a material." At her solo show at Realities Gallery in Melbourne Fedderson explained: "Over the years my work has changed greatly, at first, weaving was a craft I enjoyed, but slowly as it took on a sculptured look it became more of an art. I get most of my inspiration from nature. When I get a new idea I put it into practice several times and then tire of it and go on to another idea. So I suppose I am improving all the time."

== Artist-educator ==
In 1972, Feddersen taught weaving to the local indigenous people in Santa Teresa Mission, 150 kms from Alice Springs. After a sojourn in Africa in 1974 where she researched textiles she returned to Australia suffering from a tropical disease. She found the trip tough and lonely, and contrary to her grandfather's experiences as a government official there, being a white woman on her own was threatening, but in works exhibited at her 1975 solo show at Bonython Galleries she "tried to catch the mood of that strange land the flash of blue water, the yellow glow of a valley of houses the deltas, the erosion and the subtleties of the Sahara.” Around this time she and husband Lorenz amicably separated.

Producing large-scale weavings and wall hangings incorporating mixed media including jute, linen, steel and rubber and with a more artistic intention, she exhibited with Bonython Galleries. The work proved popular with collectors and interior decorators, and she was sought out as a teacher, taking simultaneous positions at Newcastle University, Willoughby Arts Centre and Alexander Mackie College before being taking full-time position at Newcastle and commuting from Sydney.

== Critical reception ==
Alan McCullouch describes her as "a leading creative weaver [whose] work includes tapestries, and woven soft sculptures as well as plaster life-size organic forms, adorned with feathers and twigs which offer wry statements on animal/human life and suffering in wars and inhumanity."

Elwyn Lynn was fulsome in his praise at the July 1970 group show with Ken Reinhard, Fred Cress and Jamie Boyd at Bonython Galleries;

"Jutta Feddersen’s tied, handspun, woven and knotted wallhangings deserve the highest praise; space, not some critics’ quaint notion that silence is the right attitude before really fine art, limits expression of one’s enthusiasm for these heirs of Abstract Expressionism and opponents of Bauhaus propriety; there are splendidly deep-textured rugs ($300 and $360), a five-foot-high orange ogre-like jelly-fish with hanging green, crimson, and purple legs or roots; a heavily knotted black-green jute banner has two threatening steel eyes; a linen-and-rayon hanging has tails of the old grey mare bound into loops with brilliant colors. In the centre, a 78in.-high black piece of twine twists from one ceiling hoop to three at the bottom; it’s a fantastically fragile piece, and is at the other end of the imaginative spectrum from Reinhard; her material and imagination grow together."

Ann Galbally reviewed for The Age the group show inaugurating the Realities Gallery, Melbourne; "Most attractive of the presentations are the six tapestries by Jutta Feddersen. Her inspiration is undoubtedly the totems of primitive art. But these forms are exorcised of their original awesomeness and baptisted into respectability by the pleasing materials used knotted jute, tied linen, silk and wool - and by the appealing simplicity of their construction."

== Education ==
- 1953: Dip. Fibre Art, Bremen, Germany
- 1988: Master of Visual Arts, City Art Institute, Sydney

== Exhibitions ==
=== Selected solo ===
- 1965, June: Jutta Federsen. Hungry Horse Gallery
- 1967, June: New Weaving by Jutta Feddersen. Aladdin Gallery, 45a Elizabeth Bay Road, King's Cross
- 1975, December: Bonython Galleries
- Roslyn Oxley9
- Coventry
- Ivan Dougherty
- 1971, from 26 October: Realities Gallery
- McClelland Galleries
- Greenaway (Adelaide)
- NERAM
- 1996, August: Jutta Feddersen : a survey exhibition - the last decade

=== Selected group ===
- 1969, February: Entries for the Stuttgart Craft Exhibition. Bonython Gallery, Sydney; Macquarie Galleries, Sydney
- 1969, from 16 September: Second biennial exhibition, N.S.W. branch of the Craft Association of Australia, opened by Professor of Fine Arts at the University of Sydney, Professor Bernard Smith. Design Centre, Sydney.
- 1970, July: Ken Reinhard; Fred Cress; Jamie Boyd; Jutta Feddersen. Bonython Galleries.
- 1971, 14 May – 5 May: Jutta Feddersen tapestries; Richard Anuszkiewicz silkscreen prints; Michael McKinnon kinetics; Oiva Toikka glass sculptures. Inaugural exhibition of Realities Gallery, Melbourne
- 1988: Mildura Sculpture Triennial
- 1995: Ironside Gallery
- 2001: Tactility. Object Centre for Art and Design, Sydney

== Commissioned tapestries ==
- 1971: Sebel Town House, Sydney
- 1973: Sydney Opera House boardroom
- 1979: Westmead Hospital

== Collections ==
- Art Gallery of Western Australia
- National Gallery of Victoria
- Queensland Art Gallery
- Museum of Applied Arts & Sciences
- Ararat Regional Art Gallery

== Publications ==
- Feddersen, Jutta (1993). Soft sculpture and beyond : an international perspective. Craftsman House. ISBN 976-8097-38-8. OCLC 30544253.
- Feddersen, Jutta (2010). Substance of shadows : the life and art of Jutta Feddersen. Murdoch Books. ISBN 978-1-74196-455-4. OCLC 723535994.

== Awards ==
- 1974: Visual Arts Board Grant
- 1978: Craft Board Grant $250 toward costs associated with participating in the first German Tapestry Exhibition
- 1978: Warringah Shire prize
- 1982; Visual Arts Board Grant
- 1992, 1993, 1994: research grants, Uni. Newcastle
- 2004/5: $25,000 New Work - Developing Writers Grant. Australia Council
