= Gareth Sansom =

Australian artist (born 1939)

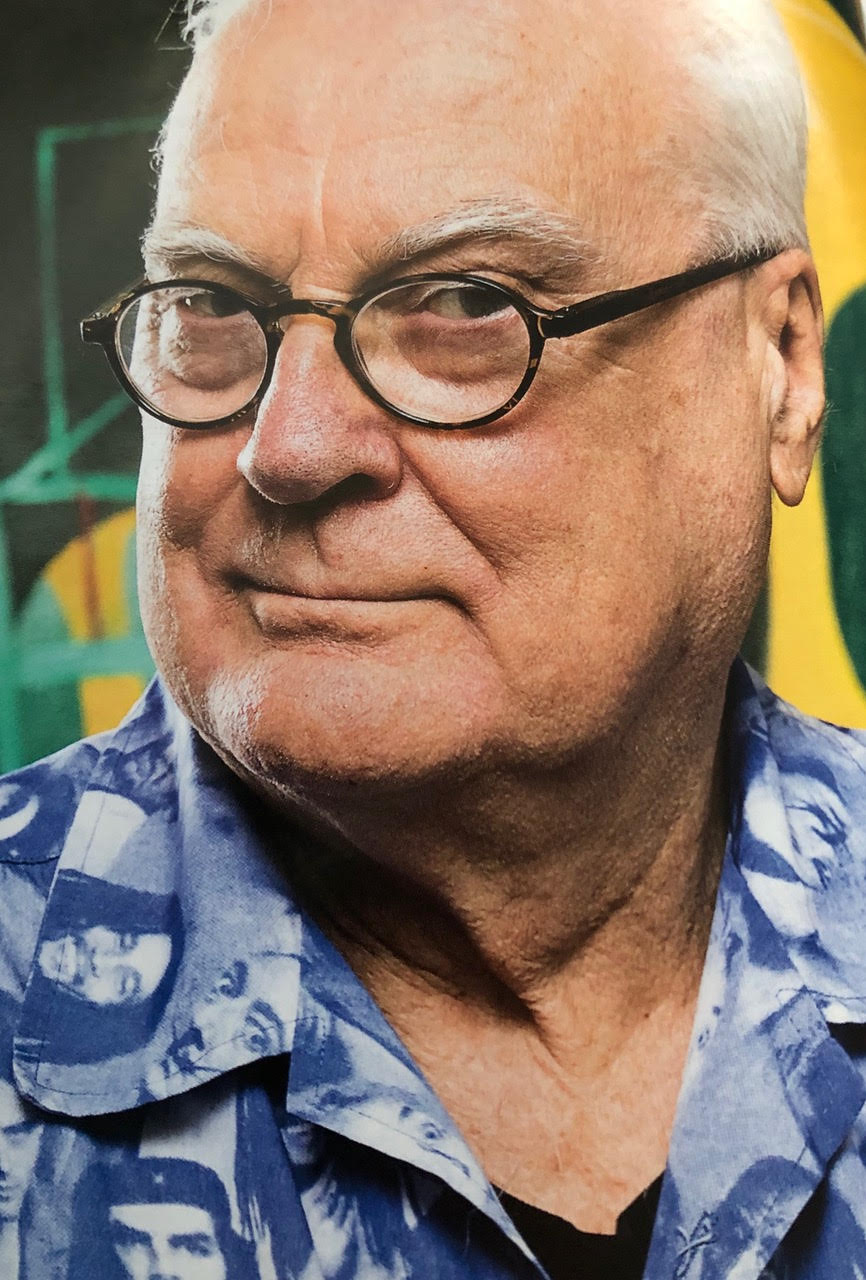
- Gareth Sansom.
- Born: 19 November 1939 (age 86); Melbourne, Victoria, Australia
- Education: RMIT (Royal Melbourne Institute of Technology)
- Known for: Oil on canvas, collage, printmaking, mixed media
- Awards: John McCaughey Memorial Prize 2008

Gareth Sansom (born 19 November 1939) is an Australian artist, painter, printmaker and collagist and winner of the 2008 John McCaughey Memorial Prize of $100,000.

Best known for introducing new themes and subject-matter into Australian art and being one of the first Australian artists to be influenced by Pop art, particularly British Pop artists like Peter Blake, Allen Jones, Derek Boshier, Joe Tilson and the formal strategies of the post-modernist R. B. Kitaj. Another major Influence was and remains the British painter Francis Bacon. He was an associate of Brett Whiteley and there was a likely mutual influence. Sansom has had a distinct influence on subsequent Australian art, paving the way for later notable artists such as Juan Davila and Howard Arkley. His work is represented by the National Gallery of Australia, the National Gallery of Victoria, the Art Gallery of New South Wales, the Metropolitan Museum of Art, New York and the Mertz Collection. His paintings are eclectic, studded with allusions both historical, cultural and personal. There is something almost diaristic about his work, but its presentation is anything but linear and logical. Abiding themes are mortality, ageing, sexual identity, popular and youth culture and cinema. There is also a strong element of humour, iconoclasm and irony in his work, from their titles, such as "Art Can't Fart (for Rose Selavay)", "Four Wise Men Looking for God in Abstract Art", "Dr Fu Manchu's Death by Gyro" or "Ship of Fools (Hello sailor!)" to comic and grotesque figurative elements and their sometimes lurid but highly resolved colour schemes. On a technical level his paintings combine oils, enamels (both sprayed and applied with brush) and collaged elements from personal photographs to objects stuck on or painted over. Stylistically Sansom uses a wide array of painting techniques but signature devices include allowing earlier layers of paint to remain visible, hard-edge geometric shapes juxtaposed with playful, lyrical, more organic or atmospheric passages of paint and figurative "doodles", often at the margins of the paintings.

Gareth Sansom, Bates Motel, 2011, oil, enamel, collage photographs on linen.

== Early career ==
Sansom studied at the Royal Melbourne Institute of Technology, (now RMIT University), from 1959 to 1964. He held his first solo exhibition in 1959 at Richman Gallery in Melbourne. He asked Arthur Boyd to open the exhibition and Boyd agreed. Boyd also purchased a painting from the show. After his studies at RMIT, two exhibitions were at South Yarra Gallery, in 1965 (from which the National Gallery of Victoria purchased the work, 'He Sees Himself'), and Gallery A, in 1966 (from which The National Collection - now Australian National Gallery - purchased the work 'Leaving that well known void'). In 1968 he painted 'The Great Democracy, where his influences can be readily discerned. (This painting is now in the collection of the Australian National Gallery, Canberra).

During the 1970s, Sansom began to experiment with self-portrait photographs involving images of himself dressed as a woman. In particular Sansom developed a series of photographs in which he portrayed Hollywood film noir icons such as Barbara Stanwyck and Joan Crawford. Two series of works on cardboard using these photographs as collaged items within graphic media and paint were shown at Warehouse Gallery, Melbourne, in 1975 and 1977.

In 1978, RMIT Gallery presented a major survey of Sansom's paintings and graphic works covering the period 1964–1978. Sansom was head of painting at the VCA School of Art, prior to becoming Dean in 1986.

== Mid career ==
In 1982, Sansom was a visiting artist at the Stedelijk Museum in Amsterdam and in 1985 he was Artist-in-Residence at The University of Melbourne.

In 1991, Sansom represented Australia at the Indian Triennial held in New Delhi. At this event he exhibited watercolours made while he lived for six months in New Delhi, in 1989. His aim had been to make one watercolour per day during this period, using humble materials, but on archival paper. Many aspects of contemporary Indian life and culture infiltrated the modus operandi of these works.

Back in Australia these watercolors were exhibited at Roslyn Oxley9Gallery in 1990 ('Out of India'), and at the Ian Potter Museum of Art at the University of Melbourne in 1991. From 1986 to 1991 Sansom was Dean of the School of Art at the Victorian College of the Arts (VCA).

In 1991 Sansom resigned from the VCA.

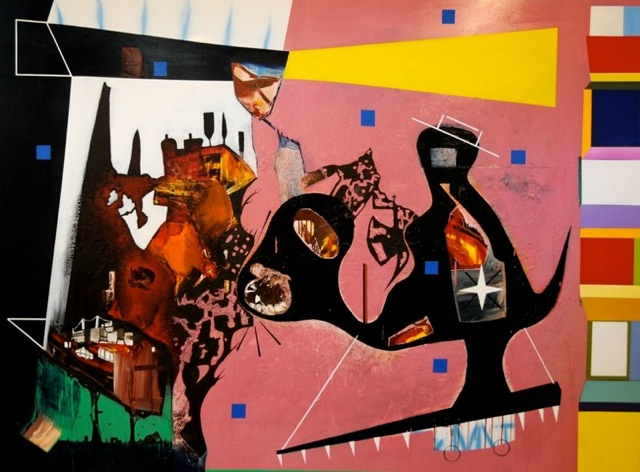
Gareth Sansom, Skateboarding punk video shit, 2009, Oil and enamel on linen

== Recent career ==
In 2005, a career survey of Sansom's work, titled "Welcome to my mind: Gareth Sansom, a study of selected works 1964-2005 ", was held at the Ian Potter Gallery at The University of Melbourne. In 2008, Sansom won the John McCaughey Memorial Prize. The judge, Alex Baker, the National Gallery of Victoria's senior curator of contemporary art, said of Sansom's work:

"The balance between figuration and abstraction, the self-investigatory aspect of the work, the psychedelic aspect, all really hit me as being very much of the moment. I think younger artists should really look at this guy's work to understand what's going on in contemporary painting."

Sansom stated recently that

"In my earlier days it was always firmly about being anti-intellectual and beating my chest. It seems somewhat foolish now. Nowadays I am open to anything that's going to make my paintings better. Where I had always relied on spontaneity I've realised you have to raise the bar and part of that is intellectually."

Sansom (now in his eighties) has recently returned to earlier themes in his paintings by inserting digital photographs of himself in various disguises using latex horror masks and realistic female masks, as well as incorporating latex prosthetics of female body parts; his aim being to create an uneasy tension between the literalness of the photographs and the painterliness within the paintings, which can veer wildly between abstraction and figuration.

Sansom is married to the painter Christine Healy. He lives and works in Melbourne and Sorrento, and is currently represented by STATION Gallery, in Melbourne: the Milani Gallery in Brisbane, Queensland; and the Roslyn Oxley9 Gallery in Sydney, NSW.

In 2016 the artist participated in the exhibition 'Magic Object' - Adelaide Biennial at the Art Gallery of South Australia. He also featured in the important survey show of Australian painting, Painting, More Painting, mounted at ACCA (Australian Centre for Contemporary Art), Melbourne. Also in 2016, Sansom was included in Today, Tomorrow, Yesterday, held at the Museum of Contemporary Art Australia (MCA), Sydney.

In 2016 Sansom was interviewed in a digital story and oral history for the State Library of Queensland's James C Sourris AM Collection. Sansom spoke about his life, art practices and his success at winning the Hugh Williamson Prize; the McCaughey Memorial Prize; and the Dobell Prize for Drawing.

In October 2017, the artist was invited to speak at the seminar, 'Artist to Artist: Gareth Sansom', during which, he discussed his work as an artist, and his important and influential role as an art educator. This event was staged as part of 'ART150' at the Victorian College of the Arts, Melbourne, Australia, which celebrated 150 years of art in Melbourne.

In 2017–2018, the Ian Potter Centre: NGV Australia staged a major retrospective of Sansom's work, 'Gareth Sansom: Transformer'. Over 130 works were featured in the exhibition, including many ground-breaking pieces that had not been previously seen in public. The exhibition comprised: suites of works on paper; photography; watercolours; collages; and paintings - including many works from the past 15 years. The show was opened by Pulitzer Prize-winning writer, Sebastian Smee, whose essay about the show stated that Sansom had a lack of sentimentality about "our darker natures; for the parts of us that idle along during the day, purring harmlessly beneath the surface of our charming, careful, mildly-anxious social selves, but that intermittently growl, bark or stare inappropriately; that come out at night, and are liable to erupt in spasms of desire, violence and teeth-baring, and are tempted by self-annihilation. Art critic for the Sydney Morning Herald, John McDonald, wrote of the exhibition's: "sheer, crazed abundance. Part fun-house, part warehouse, the show is bursting with paintings, collages, photos, objects and memorabilia. There are veins of pure kitsch, grotesquerie, dark eroticism".

In 2019, Sansom was included in the exhibition, Ways of Seeing: recent acquisitions from the collection, staged at the Art Gallery of South Australia, Adelaide. In the same year, his work was showcased in Berlin, in the exhibition, STATION at Arndt Art Agency (formerly Arndt & Partner).

== Awards and Prizes ==
- 1975 Visual Arts Board, Special Projects Grant
- 1976 Visual Arts Board, Travel Grant
- 1979 Victorian Ministry of the Arts, Tram Project
- 1982 Visiting Artist Stedelijk Museum, Amsterdam, the Netherlands
- 1984 Hugh Williamson Prize, Ballarat Fine Art Gallery
- 1986 Henry Salkauskas Art Award
- 1987 ANZ Bicentennial Commissioning Series
- 1989 Victorian Tapestry Workshop Commission
- 1991 VII - The Indian Triennale, New Delhi
- 1993/94 Collie Fellowship, Australian Print Workshop, Melbourne
- 1994 Virtuosi - Youth Music Australia Portfolio of Prints
- 2006 John Tallis Acquisitive Award, Mornington Peninsula Art Gallery
- 2008 John McCaughey Memorial Prize, National Gallery of Victoria
- 2012 Dobell Prize for Drawing, Art Gallery of NSW.
- 2025 $125,000 Sorrento Prize, (& Gallery, Sorrento).

== Collections ==
- Metropolitan Museum of Art, New York
- National Gallery of Victoria, Melbourne
- Museum of New Zealand Te Papa Tongarewa, Wellington, New Zealand
- Museum of Contemporary Art, Sydney
- Australian National Gallery, Canberra
- Art Gallery of Western Australia, Perth
- Art Gallery of New South Wales, Sydney
- Art Gallery of South Australia, Adelaide
- Tasmanian Museum and Art Gallery, Hobart
- Artbank, Sydney
- Gallery of Modern Art, Brisbane
- Museum of Modern Art at Heide, Victoria
- Geelong Art Gallery, Victoria
- Shepparton Art Gallery, Victoria
- Benalla Art Gallery, Victoria
- Ballarat Fine Art Gallery, Victoria
- Bendigo Art Gallery, Victoria
- Mornington Peninsula Art Gallery, Victoria
- Wollongong City Art Gallery, New South Wales
- Newcastle Region Art Gallery, New South Wales
