= Gil Jamieson =

Australian painter

- Gil Jamieson's Self-Portrait
- Born: Hugh Gilmour Jamieson; 31 January 1934; Monto, Queensland
- Died: 14 June 1992 (aged 58); Monto, Queensland
- Education: Brisbane Central Technical College
- Known for: Romantic figurative art, Australian landscapes & portraits
- Notable work: Jay Creek
- Awards: McCaughey Prize (1965)
- Patrons: John Reed, Cliff Pugh, Arthur Boyd

Gil Jamieson (31 January 1934 – 14 June 1992) was an Australian painter. Jamieson was born in the central Queensland town of Monto in 1934 and died there in 1992.

== Career ==
Jamieson liked to be thought of as a Romantic. He objected to the labels of art commentators. He painted figurative art works, landscape art works, and portraits striking for their passionate intensity of both subject and colour. He wrestled with the tough reality of survival in the bush and lived the landscape that he painted.

He lived and worked on the land with his family raising cattle on a bush block near Monto. He embarked on extensive expeditions throughout Australia capturing the country in gouaches he called his 'sonnets'. His 72-foot 360 degree mural Jay Creek (depicting Jay Creek, Northern Territory), an oil on canvas, painted on location in Central Australia, his largest work was painted in four days in searing heat.

Jamieson regarded himself as a self-taught artist, however he attended Brisbane Central Technical College (with Melville Haysom), 1956–57. While in Brisbane he aspired to political cartooning, worked as a quick sketch artist outside a nightclub and held his first exhibition at a Brisbane pub

Jamieson and his wife Maureen moved from Monto to Melbourne and his career flourished. His work was taken up by John Reed of Heide Museum of Modern Art where he exhibited. He developed strong friendships with fellow artists: George Johnson, Fred Williams, John Perceval, Edwin Tanner to name a few. These friendships sustained and affirmed his contribution to Australian art as later in his career, fellow artists such as Cliff Pugh and Arthur Boyd supported his work. He chose to return to the bush and relative obscurity returning regularly to exhibit in Melbourne.

Throughout his career Jamieson had many supporters of his work including Kym Bonython and Rudy Komon. He had a long association with Rockhampton exhibiting there and in Brisbane regularly throughout his career. Rockhampton Art Gallery toured a retrospective for two years throughout regional Australia and overseas 1997–9.

== Exhibitions ==
- Museum of Modern Art, Melbourne 1960
- Rudy Komon Gallery, Sydney 1961
- South Yarra Gallery, Melbourne 1962
- Bonython Gallery, Adelaide 1963
- South Yarra Gallery, Melbourne 1964
- Australian Galleries, Melbourne 1966
- Rudy Komon Gallery, Sydney 1967
- Bonython Gallery, Sydney 1971
- Bonython Gallery, Adelaide 1971
- John Gild Gallery, Perth 1972
- Talamo Gallery, Melbourne 1972
- Talamo Gallery, Melbourne 1973 (Jay Creek exhibition, 72 ft landscape from Central Australia)
- Reid Gallery, Brisbane 1974
- Gallery Up Top, Rockhampton 1974
- Gallery Up Top, Rockhampton 1975
- Gallery Up Top, Rockhampton 1976
- Gallery Up Top, Rockhampton 1977
- Gallery Up Top, Rockhampton 1978
- Philip Bacon Gallery, Brisbane 1978
- CIEA Rockhamption 1978 ('Jay Creek' exhibit, opening library by HRH Princess Alexandra)
- Adelaide Festival Centre 1978 ('Jay Creek' complementary exhibit in theatre foyer)
- Bakehouse Gallery, Mackay 1978
- Gallery Up Top, Rockhampton 1979
- Gallery Up Top, Rockhampton 1980
- Realities Gallery, Melbourne 1981
- City Hall, Brisbane 1982
- Gallery Up Top, Rockhampton 1982
- Nerang Gallery, Gold Coast 1983
- Rudy Komon Gallery, Sydney 1983
- Realities Gallery, Melbourne 1983
- Northern Territory Museum of Arts and Sciences, Darwin 1984
- The Schubert Gallery, Broadbeach 1985
- William Mora Gallery, Melbourne 1988.
- Monto Art Gallery, Monto QLD Newton Street, 2023

== Collections ==
His work was represented in many major public collections, including:

- National Gallery of Australia
- National Gallery of Victoria
- Queensland Art Gallery
- La Trobe University Art Museum
- Parliament House, Canberra
- Parliament House, Queensland
- Monto Library, Queensland

== Awards ==
- 1965: McCaughey Prize, NGV Melbourne
- 1977: Maryborough Watercolour Prize
- 1978: Bundaberg Painting Prize
- 1978: Bundaberg Watercolour Prize
- 1978: Rockhampton Art Prize
