= Mornington Peninsula Regional Gallery =

Art gallery in Victoria, Australia

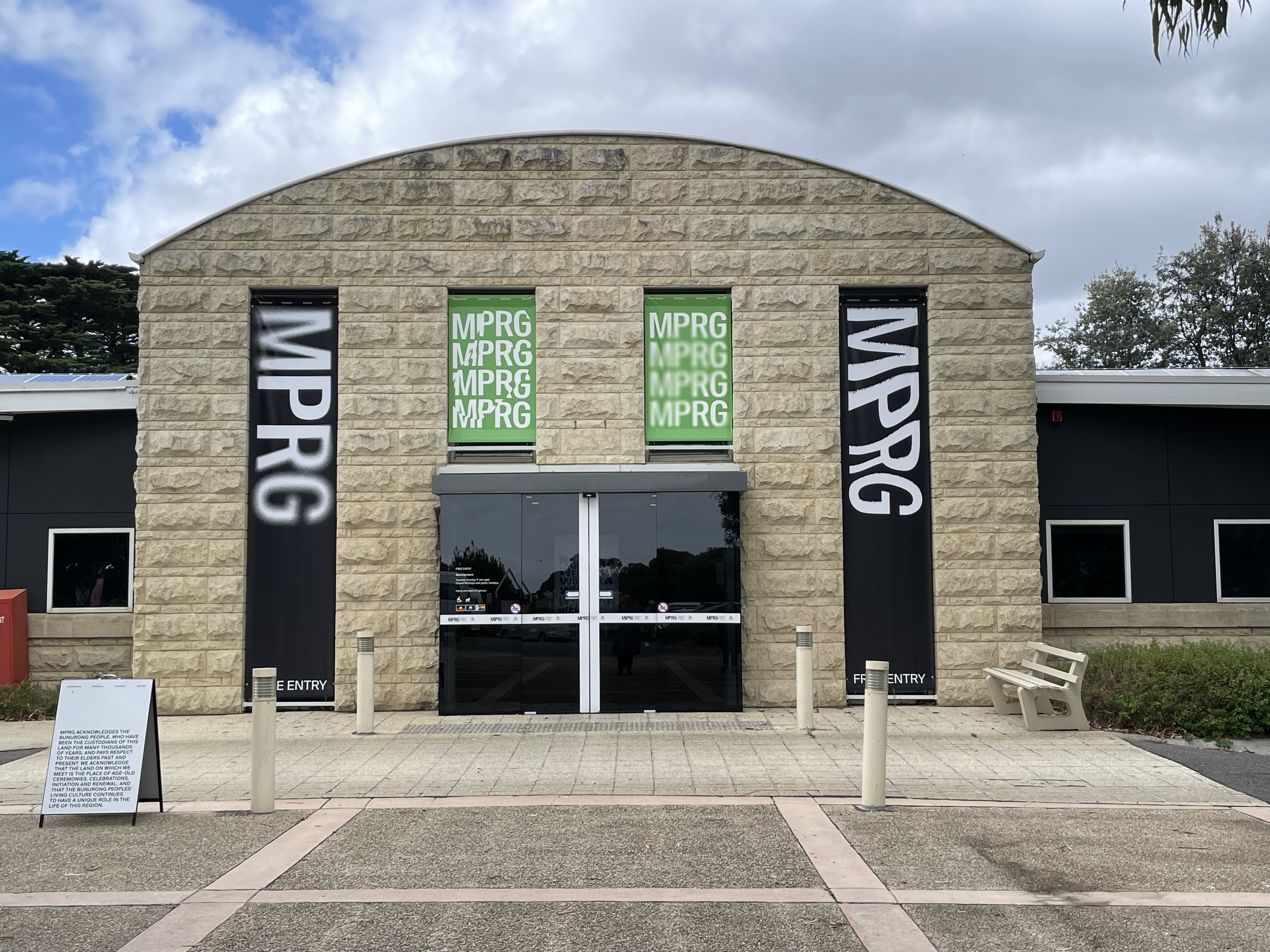
- Mornington Peninsula Regional Gallery entrance
- Coordinates: 38.237014°S 145.051875°E
- Website: mprg.mornpen.vic.gov.au/Home

Mornington Peninsula Regional Gallery (MPRG) is a public art gallery on the Mornington Peninsula, south-east of Melbourne, Australia. The gallery is host to the National Works on Paper (NWOP) acquisitive art competition

== History ==
Mornington Peninsula Regional Gallery opened in 1971.

== Description ==
MPRG is a public art gallery located in Mornington, Victoria, a south-eastern suburb of Melbourne on the Mornington Peninsula.

MPRG holds both traditional and contemporary Australian art, and includes works by Constance Stokes.

The gallery is a member of the Public Galleries Association of Victoria.

== Exhibitions ==
In 2013 the gallery hosted an exhibition of Archibald Prize paintings, setting a gallery attendance record of 48,000. The Archibald Prize Touring Exhibition returned to the gallery in 2023.

In November 2023, the gallery was the first stop for the National Gallery of Australia's Know My Name: Australian Women Artists touring exhibition.

== National Works on Paper ==
The National Works on Paper (NWOP) biennial acquisition award for contemporary Australian artists was established in 1998. Hosted by the gallery, the award is open to works in drawing, printmaking, digital prints, and paper sculpture.
