= The Adventures of Sebastian the Fox =

- Genre: Children's television
- Written by: Tim Burstall
- Directed by: Tim Burstall
- Composer: George Dreyfus
- Country of origin: Australia
- Original language: English
- No. of episodes: 13

Production
- Producer: Patrick Ryan
- Cinematography: Giorgio Mangiamele
- Running time: 10 minutes

Original release
- Network: ABC Television
- Release: 1963 – 1963

The Adventures of Sebastian the Fox is a 1963 Australian children's series. The show combined a string puppet, a mischievous fox named Sebastian, who was placed in real-life settings. It was among the first shows of its kind produced in Australia, as it was very different from earlier Australian children's series like Peters Club and Tarax Show. The Sebastian puppet was designed and operated by puppeteer Peter Scriven.

The music was composed by George Dreyfus, who became a leading Australian composer. The score was subsequently arranged by Dreyfus for various small ensemble combinations for performance by young musicians as a complete concert.

== Episodes ==
No.	Title
1	"Sebastian and the Sausages"
Sebastian steals sausages cooked by a tramp
2	"Sebastian and the Burglar"
Sebastian seeks refuge in a house at the same time as a burglar
3	"The Bomb"
4	"The Animal Catcher"
Sebastian is caught by a pet catcher
5	"The Sleepwalkers"
Sebastian dresses up as a ghost
6	"The Showman"
A greedy showman exploits Sebastian's talents as a violinist
7	"The Gold Mine"
Sebastian buys a gold mine
8	"The Painter"
Sebastian enters an artist's studio
9	"The Doll's House"
Sebastian decides to move into a doll's house
10	"The Castaway"
Sebastian gets shipwrecked
11	"The Classroom"
Sebastian plays up in a classroom
12	"The Potters"
Sebastian moves into a potter's studio
13	"The Fashion Parade"
Sebastian wanders into the middle of the judging of the Best Dressed Man of the Year Competition
