= Jess Johnson =

New Zealand artist

- Born: 1979 (age 46–47); Tauranga, New Zealand
- Education: Canterbury University
- Known for: drawings, virtual reality
- Notable work: Ixian Gate (2015) (w/ Simon Ward), Whol Why Wurld (2017) (w/ Simon Ward), TERMINUS (2018) (w/Simon Ward)
- Website: www.jessjohnson.org

Jess Johnson (born 1979) is a New Mexico-based New Zealand contemporary artist who works in drawing, installation, animation, and virtual reality. Her drawings depict alternative realms while her collaborations with Simon Ward and Andrew Clarke adapt the world of her drawings into video animations and virtual reality.

== Early Life and Education ==
Jess Johnson was born in Tauranga, New Zealand in 1979. She grew up in Mount Maunganui, New Zealand and attended University of Canterbury in Christchurch from 1997 to 2001, where she earned a BFA.

== Career ==
In 2004 she moved to Melbourne, Australia, where she co-founded and ran Hell Gallery from 2008 to 2011. She began exhibiting her work in group and solo shows throughout Australia and New Zealand, including shows at institutions such as the Museum of Contemporary Art in Sydney and the National Gallery of Victoria in Melbourne.

In 2016 she relocated to New York City after participating in the Australia Council's Greene Street residency in SoHo. In 2023-2024, she was part of the year-long Roswell Artist-in-Residence program in Roswell, New Mexico, and currently lives and works between New Mexico and New Zealand.

== Works ==
=== Drawings ===
Johnson's drawings typically include bold colors, repetitive and fractal geometric shapes, humanoid figures, alien creatures, and structures that draw from both classical and ancient architecture. They have been likened to the work of Japanese pop-psychedelia artist Keiichi Tanaami. Although the detail and precision of her drawings suggest digital composition, the drawings are all done by hand. Mistakes made during the creation of her drawings "act as mutational directions" that she incorporates into them. She has said: "If I were able to digitally erase my mistakes, I wouldn't necessarily get that organic growth in the world. I like that it's a little out of my control and driven by something else."

About Johnson's drawings, Chloe Mandryk of Art Almanac wrote:

Jess Johnson's complex and sensuous images use bold colour and a geometric bravura that conjure the glow and kinaesthesia of arcade video games and the 'wormholes' of speculative thought so key to good science fiction. Her humanoids occupy a virtual reality comprised of patterns and ancient architectural forms that delineate the boundaries of these imagined spaces.

Johnson has discussed the role of text in the creation of her drawings:

Whenever I start a new drawing I first choose a piece of text from one of my notebooks. The text is almost always the starting point. Whatever amorphous vibe the words give off determines the imagery that comes. The phrases are often rhythmic and I choose them because they get stuck in my head like thought-worms. The text plays a really practical role in the construction of the drawings. The letters and words are like scaffolding and I often arrange the composition around them. The number of letters gives me mathematical starting points for mapping out other areas.

=== Animation and Virtual Reality ===
In 2014, Johnson began collaborating with video artist Simon Ward to adapt her drawings into animated video. Their first collaborative work, the single-channel high-definition digital video Mnemonic Pulse, premiered at Gertrude Contemporary in Melbourne in March 2014. Composer Andrew Clarke created original audio for the piece and continues to collaborate with Johnson and Ward.

The first virtual reality work created by Johnson, Ward, and Clarke, Ixian Gate, premiered in 2015 as the centrepiece of Johnson's solo exhibition, WURM HAUS, at the National Gallery of Victoria in Melbourne.

Johnson and Ward then began creating a series of five HD video animations, each of which translated a single drawing by Johnson. In 2017, these videos premiered at The National 2017 at Carriageworks in Sydney as the installation piece WHOL WHY WURLD. The work was a finalist for the 2018 Walters Prize.

In May 2017, Johnson and Ward received a commission from the National Gallery of Australia (Canberra) for a major new virtual reality work as part of the Balnaves Contemporary Intervention Series. Five new VR pieces premiered as part of Terminus, Johnson and Ward's exhibition at the NGA, opening 4 May 2018.

=== XYZZY (Full-Dome Projection Film) ===
In 2023, Johnson and collaborator Simon Ward premiered XYZZY, a full-dome cinematic experience produced in conjunction with the planetarium at Tūhura Otago Museum. The film has since played at planetariums, film festivals, and venues around the around the world, including Liberty Science Center, Tallahassee Film Festival, Now or Never Festival in Melbourne, and Stardome Planetarium in Auckland. In 2025, XYZZY was nominated for a Best of Earth Award.

Johnson and Ward adapted XYZZY as a projection mapping experience at Hamer Hall in Melbourne as part of the 2026 Now or Never Festival. The soundtrack to XYZZY, composed by Lachlan Anderson, Stef Animal, Luke Rowell, and Andrew Clarke, was released as a special edition vinyl album and on SoundCloud in 2026.

== Influences ==
Johnson has identified a wide range of influences including the ideas of Terence McKenna; Frank Herbert's Dune and the works of Alejandro Jodorowsky; the dystopian novel Riddley Walker by Russell Hoban; early video games; and comics.

== Exhibitions ==
=== Selected Solo Exhibitions ===
- Skree Stakka (w/ Simon Ward), NightLights Denver, CO, USA, 2025
- Obelisks & Viroids, Sushi Saito Hanare, NANZUKA, Tokyo, Japan, 2025
- Necro Techno Flesh Complex, Meow Wolf Santa Fe, NM, USA, 2024
- g/re/p, Co-Lab Projects, Austin, TX, USA, 2024
- Honk if you don’t exist, Roswell Museum, New Mexico, USA, 2023
- We can't keep going the way we've been going but we know no other way to go, Shepparton Art Museum, VIC, AUS, 2023
- Terminus + XYZZY (w/ Simon Ward), Tuhura Otago Museum, Dunedin, NZ, 2023
- Killjoy & Bez, Darren Knight Gallery, Sydney, AUS, 2022
- Antireality Perversion Void, Wellington City Gallery, NZ, 2022
- Core Dump, Jack Hanley Gallery, New York, NY, 2022
- Neon Meat Dream, Nanzuka Gallery, Tokyo, Japan, 2019
- Panspermia, Sing Omega, Jack Hanley Gallery, New York, NY, 2019
- Terminus (w/ Simon Ward), National Gallery of Australia, Canberra, 2018
- Auckland Art Fair, Ivan Anthony Gallery, Auckland, New Zealand, 2018
- Everything not saved will be lost, Jack Hanley Gallery, New York, NY, 2017
- Jess Johnson at CLIFT, presented by FOUR A.M, San Francisco, CA, 2017
- Hex Nemesis, Fremantle Arts Centre, Fremantle, Australia, 2017
- Chondrule Terminus (w/ Andrew Clarke), Dark Mofo: Welcome Stranger, Tasmania, Australia, 2017
- Darren Knight Gallery, Discoveries Section, Art Basel, Hong Kong, 2016
- Eclectrc Panoptic, Talbot Rice Gallery, Edinburgh, Scotland, 2017
- Wurm Haus, National Gallery of Victoria, Melbourne, Australia, 2015
- Sensorium Chamber, Ivan Anthony Gallery, Auckland, New Zealand, 2015
- Endless Future Terror Forever, Darren Knight Gallery, Sydney, Australia, 2015
- Gertrude Edition 2015, Gertrude Contemporary Art Spaces, Melbourne, Australia, 2015
- Electric Affinity: Jess Johnson/Tina Havelock Stevens, Alaska Projects, Sydney, Australia, 2015
- Ratholes in the Babylon of Information, Ivan Anthony Gallery, Auckland, New Zealand, 2014
- Gamma World, Vivid Festival, MCA Facade, Sydney, Australia, 2014
- Mnemonic Pulse, Gertrude Contemporary Studio 12, Melbourne, Australia, 2014

== Awards ==
- John McCaughey Memorial Prize, acquisitive commission for National Gallery of Victoria, Australia, 2013

== Collections ==
Jess Johnson's works are held in the following permanent collections:

- Christchurch Art Gallery, New Zealand (3 works)
- James Wallace Arts Trust, Auckland, New Zealand (2 works)
- National Gallery of Australia, Canberra, Australia
- Museum of Contemporary Art, NSW Australia (1 work)
- Monash University Museum of Art, VIC Australia (3 works)
- Michael Buxton Collection] Melbourne, Australia (3 works)
- National Gallery of Victoria, Melbourne, Australia (14 works)
- Artbank, NSW Australia (2 works)
