= Enzo Marciano =

Italian composer

Enzo Marciano is an Italian conductor, composer and organist.

== Early life ==
Enzo was born in Corigliano d'Otranto (Lecce) into a musical family. He studied at the Santa Cecilia Conservatory in Rome with Barbara Giuranna, Fernando Germani, Franco Ferrara and Olivio Di Domenico. He also studied with Giovanni Orsomando and Peter Rorke. He first conducted at age of 10 when his father Donato (a conductor) pushed him on the podium and told him to conduct the opening item of a concert because he felt sick (it was not true).

== Career ==
Enzo has conducted orchestras in Italy and in Australia where he lives with his wife Marisa (a concert pianist) and two children Dony and Sebastian (both musicians). Some of his concerts have been recorded live and published on CDs. Much of his professional career has been spent in Australia where he is the organist at the National Shrine of St. Anthony in Melbourne. Enzo's compositions include music for films, TV shows, a Passacaglia for organ and orchestra, various orchestral and choral works, three Masses and orchestrations of the most popular organ music by Bach which have been recorded and published on CDs. His recording of the Beethoven's Eroica has been highly acclaimed. Orchestral works by Dvorak, Tchaikovsky, Beethoven (including Symphony No.9), Cimarosa, Pergolesi, Mozart, Vivaldi, Brahms, Barsanti, Smetan a, Rossini, Verdi, Puccini etc. have been recorded and published on CDs. He has recorded and published twelve CD's of popular church music used for various religious services. He has been organist at Fono-Roma (music for films) where he played Ennio Morricone's music. He has toured Italy and Australia as Organ recitalist and his organ repertoire includes music by Franck, Messian, Bach, Widor, Vivaldi (own arrangements), Kargt-Elert etc. He has been awarded the Medal of Solidarity by the Italian President.
