= Georges Mora =

German-born Australian businessman, gallerist, art dealer

- Born: Gunter Morawski; 26 June 1913; Leipzig, German Empire
- Died: 7 June 1992 (aged 78); Melbourne, Australia
- Other name: Georges Morand
- Occupation: Art Dealer
- Years active: 1954-1992
- Known for: Mentorship of Australian artists, establishment of Tolarno Galleries
- Spouse(s): Mirka Mora (m.1947, div.1979), Caroline Williams (m.1985)
- Children: Philippe (b.1949), William (b.1953), Tiriel (b.1958), Sam (b.1985)

Georges Mora (26 June 1913 – 7 June 1992) was a German-born Australian entrepreneur, art dealer, patron, connoisseur and restaurateur.

== Early life ==
Mora was born Gunter Morawski on 26 June 1913 in Leipzig, Germany, of Jewish Polish heritage. As a young medical student Mora became a member of a communist cell and fled Germany to Paris in 1930. When the Spanish Civil War broke out, Georges left Paris to join the cause. After a plane crash, he was a prisoner of war for a short time. He was active in the French Resistance in World War II, using the alias Georges Morand. After the War, Georges worked as a patent dealer and became the director of a Jewish rehabilitation home for children run by Œuvre de secours aux enfants (OSE) in Paris. Later In 1947 he married Parisian artist and fellow Jewish refugee Mirka Zelik, becoming a French citizen.

== New York and Melbourne ==
In 1949, after the birth of Georges' and Mirka's first son Philippe Mora (a filmmaker), they joined his family in New York, then in July 1951 moved on to McKinnon, Melbourne where he adopted the name Georges Mora. With characteristic adaptability he took up management of a matzo factory. Seeking more romantic quarters Georges and Mirka moved into Grosvenor Chambers (Ola Cohn's former studio) at 9 Collins Street Melbourne (the so called 'Paris End'). Sons William Mora, born in 1953, and Tiriel Mora (1958), are respectively an art dealer and an actor.

=== Mirka Café ===
Recognising that their hospitality and cuisine were marketable, the Moras opened a coffee lounge. Mirka Café was opened by Jean Sablon in December 1954 at 183 Exhibition Street and was the venue for the first major solo exhibition by Joy Hester. It was the first in Melbourne where patrons could eat at tables on the pavement in the Parisian style and the café became the watering-hole of Melbourne's avant-garde. Patrons ate from Expressionist crockery by Arthur Boyd and John Perceval, were seated on surrealist furniture, and surrounded by murals and sculptures by Clifford Last, Ian Sime and Julius Kane.

=== Contemporary Art Society and MOMAA ===
In 1956, Georges Mora was elected President of the Contemporary Art Society and declared at a CAS meeting that: "We must break down this prejudice in the world that Australia is an artistically backward country. There is only one solution: that is, the pushing of Australian artistic achievements into the world and to bring the world’s artistic achievements into this country." Artists donated paintings towards an inaugural fundraising exhibition in 1957. In 1958 Mora helped John and Sunday Reed transform the Contemporary Art Society gallery, where George's wife Mirka had exhibited in August the year before into the 'Museum of Modern Art (and Design) of Australia' (MOMAA), modelled on MoMA in New York, with John as its director and located in Tavistock Place, a lane-way off 376 Flinders Street, Melbourne.

=== Café Balzac ===
In 1958 Mora established Café Balzac in East Melbourne gaining a reputation as a restaurateur serving classic French cuisine to an eager clientele, which included a gathering of the most significant contemporary Australian artists, to whom he proffered the walls of his establishment. A mural commissioned by Mora in 1962 was painted as individual panels by three Sydney-based 'Annandale Imitation Realists'; Colin Lanceley, Mike Brown and Ross Crothall in exchange for meals and accommodation. It survives as the largest, and one of the best known, examples of the Australian Pop Movement of the early 1960s. Ross Crothall's panel has an inscription "To George(sic) Mora, with love."

=== Aspendale ===
The Moras' modernist house at bayside Aspendale was designed in 1961 by architect Peter Burns. The house opened onto a common courtyard shared by the Moras' close friends Sunday and John Reed art patrons and founders of the Heide Circle and was regularly visited by artists Charles Blackman, Albert Tucker, John Perceval, Sidney Nolan, Joy Hester, John Olsen, Colin Lanceley, Gareth Sansom, Mike Brown, Martin Sharp, Asher Bilu and Ivan Durrant. They were joined by prominent journalists and writers Barrett Reid, Brian McArdle and Philip Jones, who found company amongst the likes of French mime Marcel Marceau, Barry Humphries, photographers such as Robert Whitaker and Mark Strizic, and filmmaker Nigel Buesst.

== Tolarno Galleries ==
Georges and Mirka relocated their business, opening in 1965 the Tolarno Restaurant and Galleries in Melbourne's bohemian St Kilda. Mirka created a bas-relief behind the bar and painted murals on walls and windows of the restaurant and bistro, hallway and toilets, over the period 1965 to 1978. The rear of the building became a venue for exhibitions of avant-garde art and was soon surrounded by other galleries. In 1969, to avoid bankruptcy, Mora sold the Tolarno hotel and leased out the restaurant and gallery. In the early 1970s he separated from Mirka.

In 1979, Mora sold the restaurant to Leon Massoni and relocated the Tolarno Galleries to River Street, South Yarra. The opening show there included lithographs by Renoir secured through his work as a dealer for Daniel Wildenstein. Georges travelled to the USA and Europe promoting the international reputation of Australian art, and selling European, American and Australian art into his adopted country's national, state, regional and corporate collections, lending work for a very significant Bonnard exhibition touring Melbourne, Sydney, Adelaide and Perth state museums in 1971. Exhibitions in the first years (1967–69) of the new gallery also presented radical hard-edge abstractions by Dale Hickey and Robert Hunter and sculpture by Ti Parks. William Mora joined his father in running the gallery before setting up his own in the city. Jan Minchin, who came from a position at the National Gallery of Victoria, was Georges co-director from 1989. Throughout its career, Tolarno Galleries supported challenging contemporary art, including eight shows of highly-charged politico-sexual imagery by Juan Davila.

In 1985 Georges married artist Caroline Williams when their son, Sam, was born. Georges was made a Chevalier des Arts et des Lettres by the French government in 1989 and he was a strong supporter of the move toward multiculturalism in his adopted country.

== Death and legacy ==
On 7 June 1992, at the age of 78, and still energetically running the Tolarno Gallery, Mora died of a brain tumour. He was buried at Cheltenham New Cemetery, where his grave bears the quip 'Out to Lunch'.

Tolarno continues under the directorship of Jan Minchin in new premises at Level 4, 104 Exhibition Street, Melbourne, not far from the site of Mirka Café of the 1950s. George and Mirka's son William has continued the family line of dealer for many decades and his William Mora Galleries is at 60 Tanner St. Richmond.

Monsieur Mayonnaise, the 2016 documentary directed by Trevor Graham and named for Mora's nickname given him by the Resistance, features as interviewee and narrator his son Philippe Mora.

=== The Georges Mora Foundation ===
In Georges' memory The Georges Mora Foundation was established in 2006. It is a not-for-profit cultural foundation dedicated to the promotion of contemporary art and artists in Melbourne and Australia. In May 2006, the foundation was officially launched by Baillieu Myer with inaugural patron, Dame Elisabeth Murdoch. The Foundation awards a fellowship each year through the State Library of Victoria to a contemporary artist whose work conveys a sense of gravitas. Georges Mora Foundation Fellowships have been awarded to Ruth Höflich (2019), Jude Walton (2018), Catherine Evans (2017), Inez de Vega (2015), Brook Andrew & Trent Walter (2013), Linda Tegg (2012), Ross Coulter (2010), Philip Brophy (2009), Cyrus Tang (2008), and Trinh Vu (2007).

== Bibliography ==
- Beier, Uli.Mirka. 1980 Melbourne : Macmillan
- Blackman, Barbara. "The good ship Mora: Melbourne in the 1950s". Meanjin 2.1996 (winter), pp. 293–305
- de Berg, Hazel [Oral history tape]. 1965 Canberra, ACT : National Library of Australia
- Burke, Janine. The Heart Garden: Sunday Reed and Heide. 2004. Sydney: Knopf.
- Harris, Max; & Dutton, Geoffrey. The Vital Decade : ten years of Australian art and letters. 1968 Melbourne : Sun
- McCulloch, Alan. Encyclopedia of Australian Art. 1984 Melbourne : Hutchinson of Australia (2nd edition)
- Mora, Mirka. Wicked but Virtuous : My Life (autobiography). 2000 Ringwood, Vic : Viking
- Reed, John. New Painting 1952-62. 1963 Melbourne : Longmans
