= James McGrath =

James McGrath may refer to:

- J. Howard McGrath (1903–1966), sixtieth Governor of Rhode Island
- James McGrath (Australian politician) (born 1974), Senator from Queensland
- James McGrath (Canadian politician) (1932–2017), Lieutenant Governor of Newfoundland, Canada
- James McGrath (Wisconsin politician) (1836–?), Wisconsin State Assemblyman
- James Francis McGrath (1859–1902), fisherman and political figure in Newfoundland
- James Frank McGrath, religion professor at Butler University in Indianapolis, USA
- Jim McGrath (Australian commentator) (born c. 1952), Australian horse racing commentator, who works for the BBC
- Jim McGrath (British commentator) (born 1955), British horse racing commentator, and Managing Director of Timeform
- Jimmy McGrath (1907–?), English footballer
- James M. McGrath (1902–1975), physician and politician in Newfoundland
- James McGrath (artist) (born 1969), Australian artist and architect
- James McGrath (referee) (born 1977), Irish hurling referee
