= Napier Street Housing =

Coordinates: 37.803998°S 144.979875°E

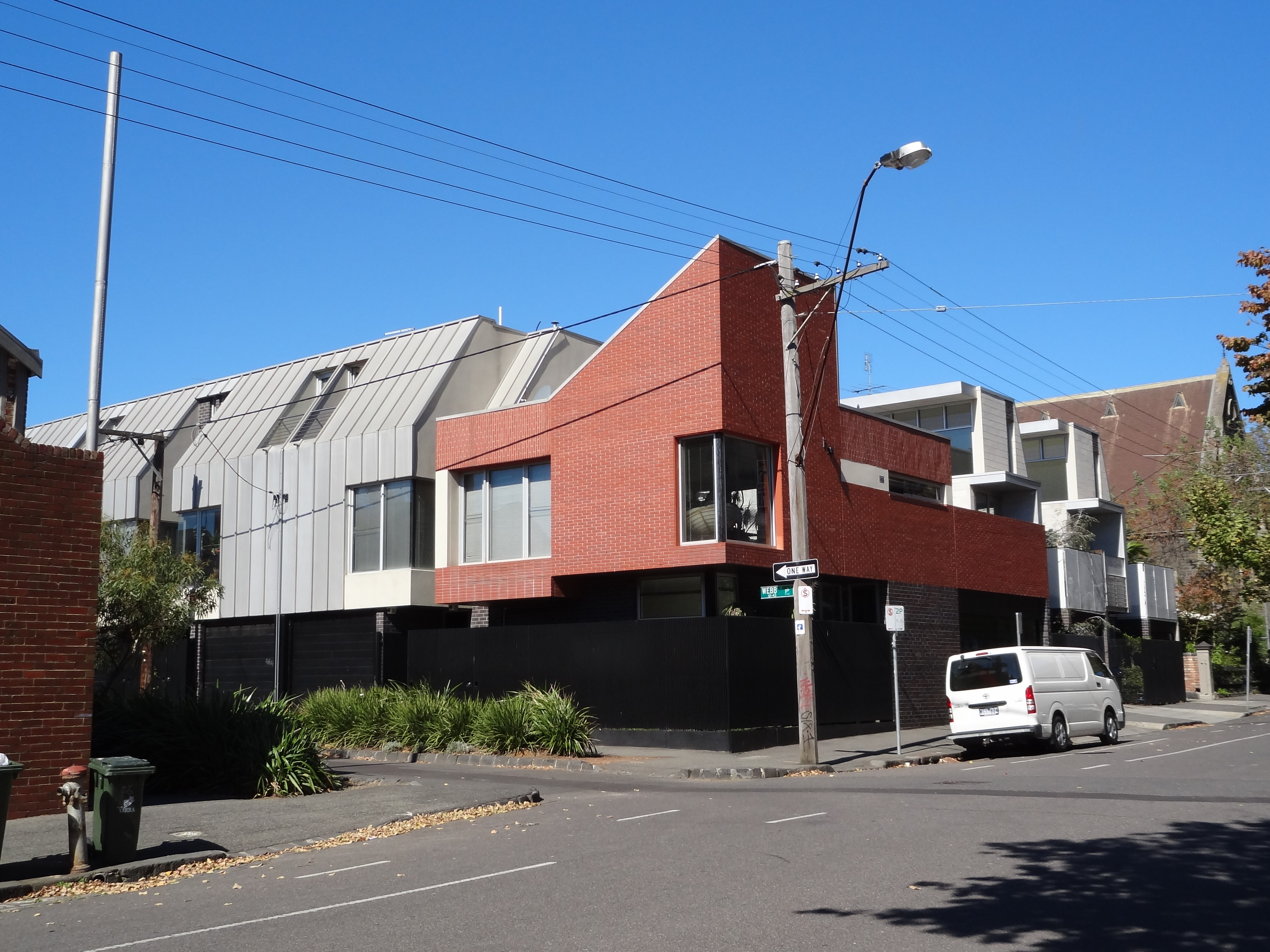
Napier Street Housing – Corner of Webb St. and Napier St., Fitzroy

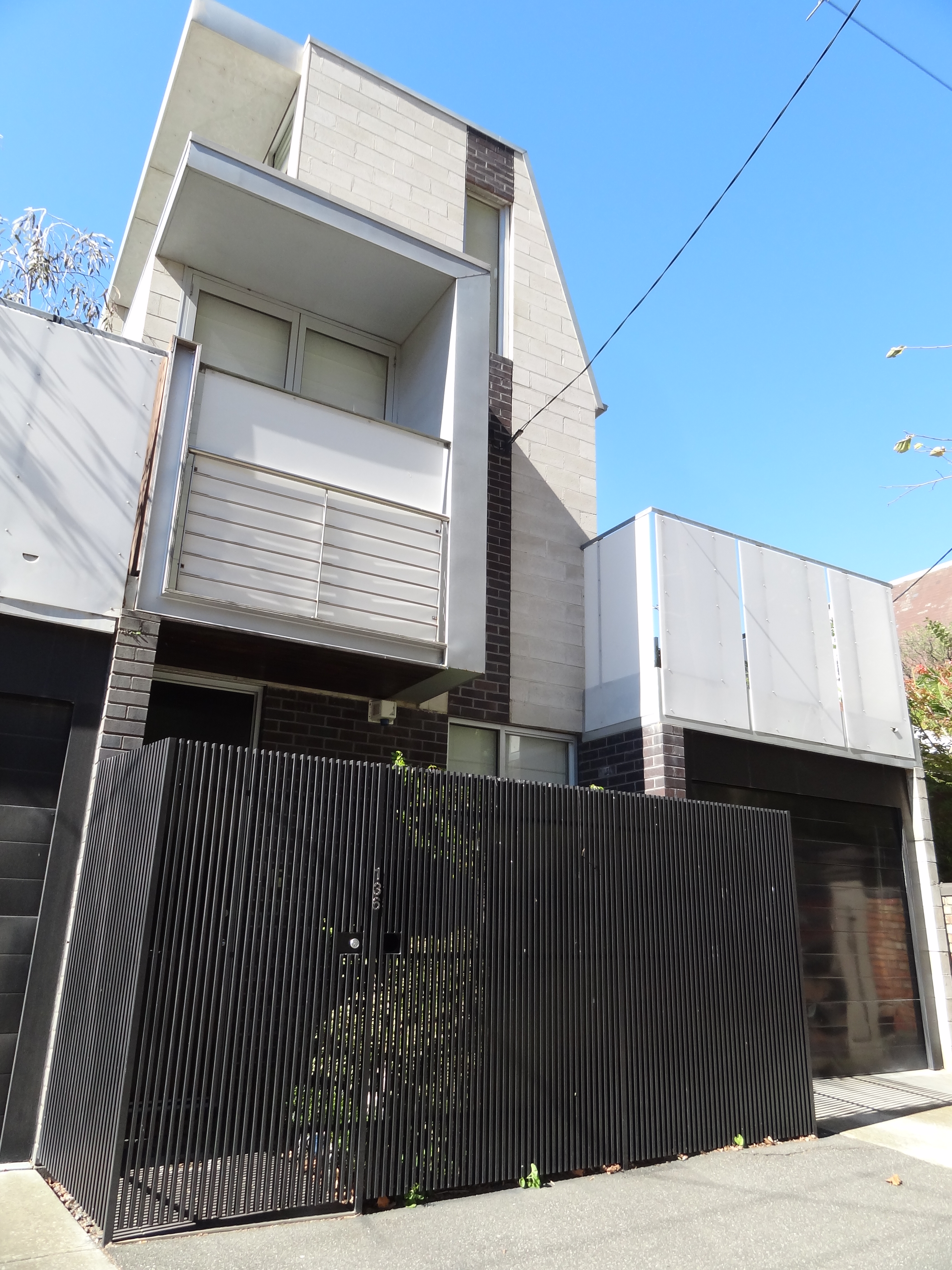
Napier Street Housing – Terrace Entrance on Napier Street

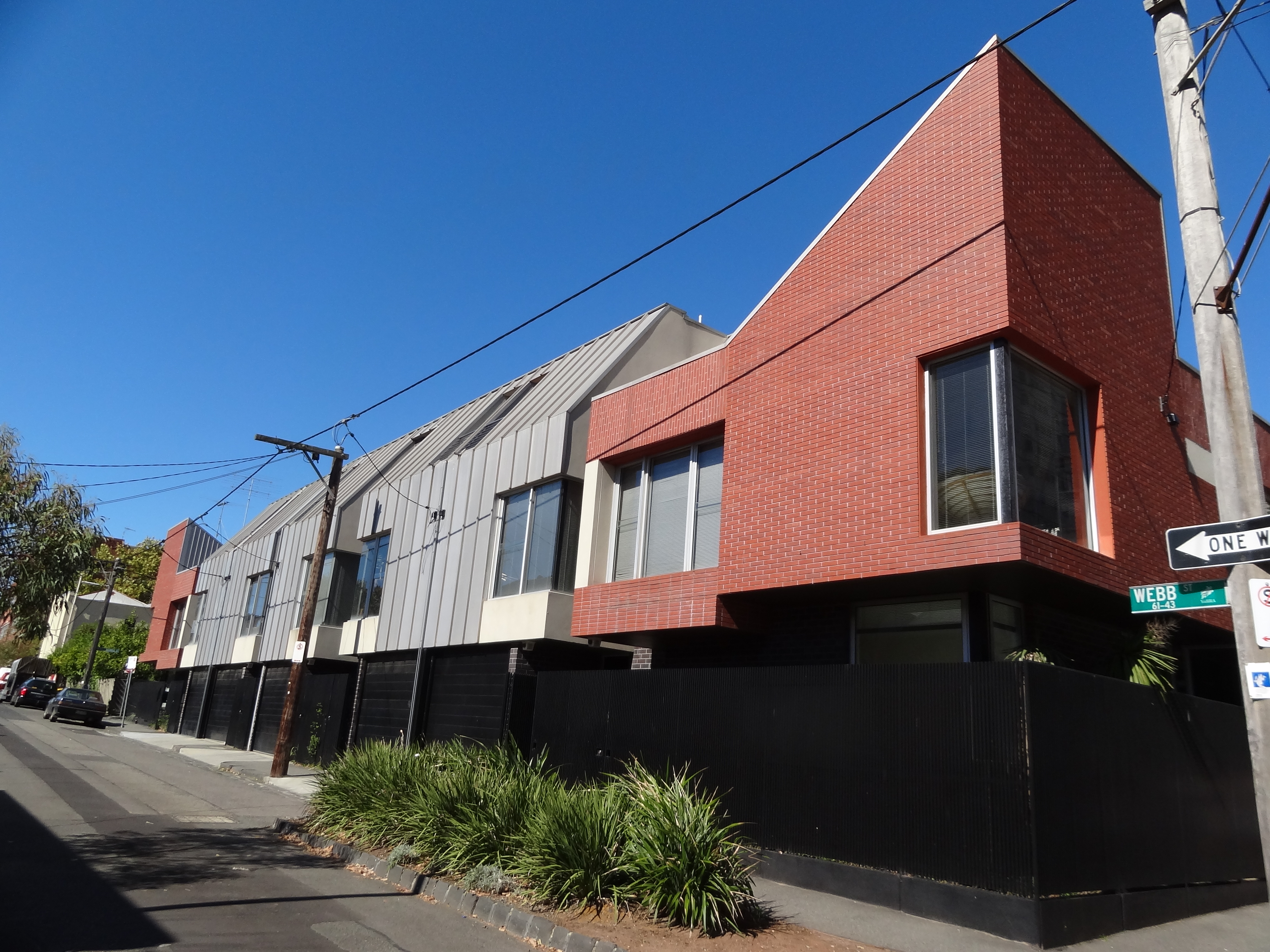
Napier Street Housing – Webb St. Elevation

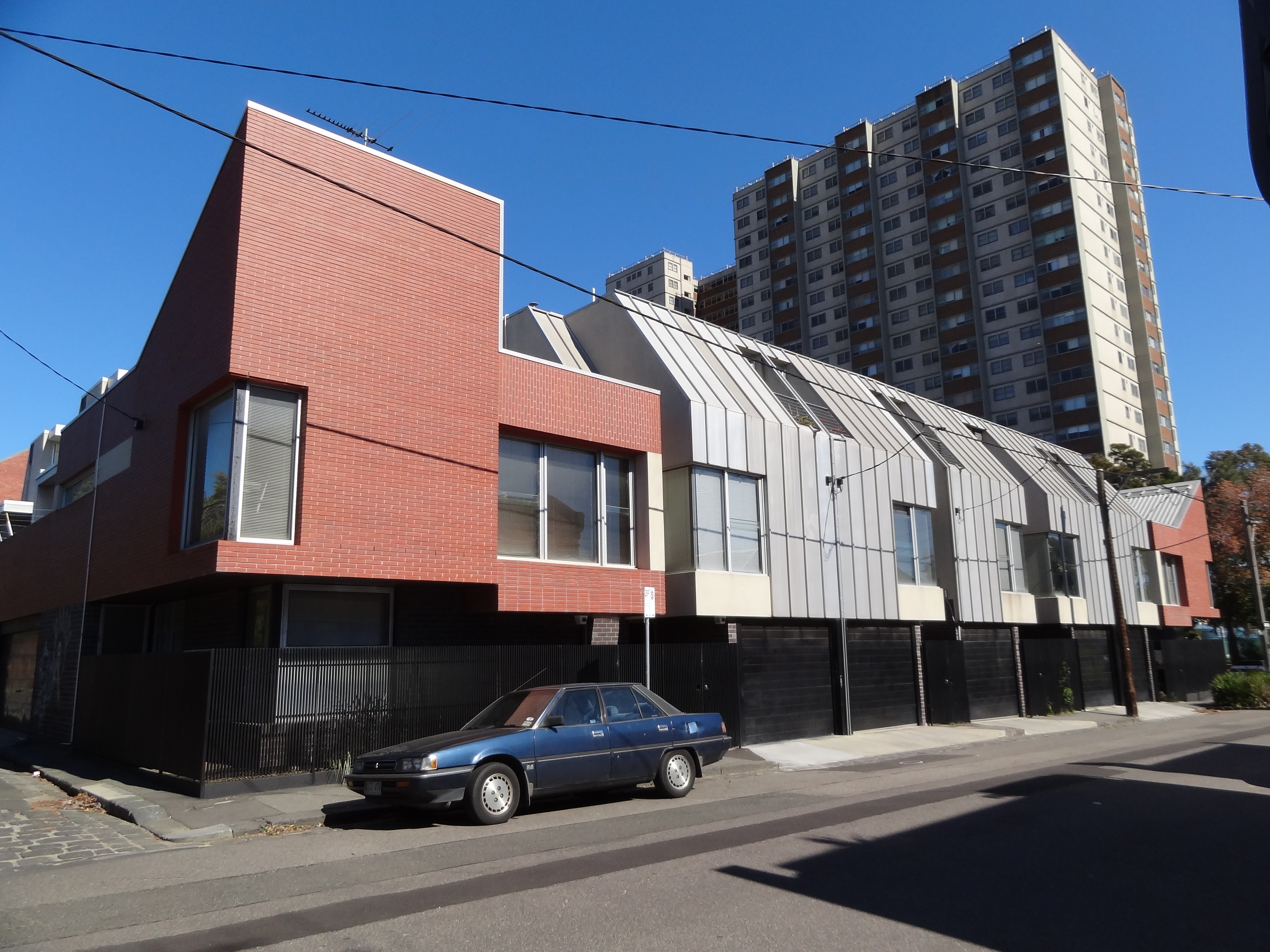
Napier Street Housing – Napier St. Elevation

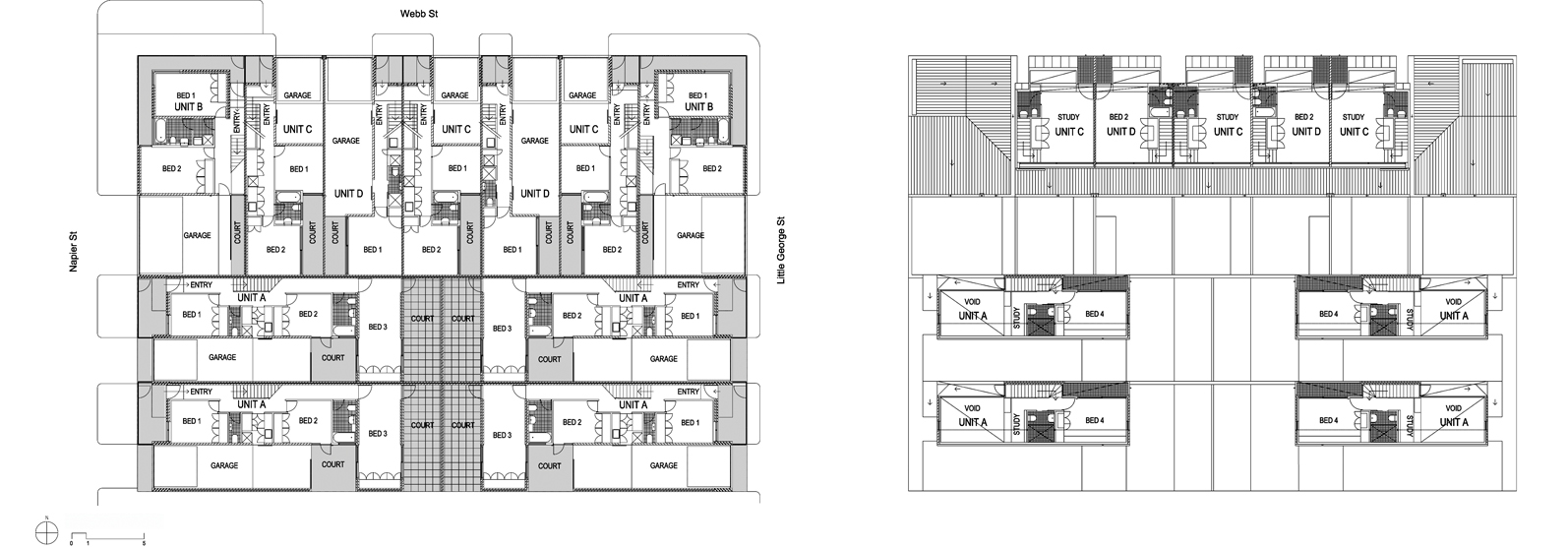
Floor plans by Kerstin Thompson Architects

Completed in 2001, Napier Street Housing is a residential complex in Fitzroy, Victoria, designed by Kerstin Thompson Architects. The design was awarded the RAIA Residential Multiple Award in 2002. The project is a medium-density development which articulates many of Kerstin Thompson's architectural ideologies regarding ideas on the "interstitial" as a mode of thinking around architecture, and a preference for hybrid and complex solutions rather than single expressions. These ideologies resulted in two strong themes, a distinctive entanglement with the idea of context and a creative approach towards dwelling configurations.

== Description ==
The personnel involved in the project include Kerstin Thompson, Michael Archibald and Simone Koch. The design includes eleven dwellings and each one includes a generous roof terrace and flexible options for occupation. The terraces are arrested at two corners by brick skillions, which, along with the use of materials, create a sense of continuity within the design. Running parallel to the rear of the terraces, four dwellings are arranged in two serial lines of extruded three-storey volumes. Large brick faces hover over the street, giving a visual connection to the larger brick forms beyond. The return sides of the radically sloping brick walls reconnect them to the scale of the five intervening terraces. On the lane-way corner, this system is reversed so that the terraces contrast in height to the reversed inclination of the skillion. The project is surrounded at street level by fine-gauge steel fencing which protects small threshold gardens at each dwelling's entry.

== Key influences and design approach ==
Located at the centre of an established residential precinct, this project responds to a variety of neighbouring building types ranging from historic terraces and row houses to converted industrial buildings and post-war housing towers. Napier Street Housing takes the linear disposition of the traditional terrace housing – formal rooms at the front, narrow services rooms into the depth of the block, indented side light court and rear pocket garden – and reconfigures it vertically. The ground floor includes the garages and secondary bedrooms which are placed around narrow internal light courts. The location of the bedrooms has allowed the architect to elevate the main living area to the first floor, where each dwelling leads out to generous open spaces. In response to the uncertainty of occupation often associated with speculative housing, Thompson has created a floor plan with flexible and innovative internal spatial solutions that encourages a variety of forms of use.

In the four detached rear dwellings, Thompson has continued her ongoing examination of appropriate housing models by creating street elevations that act as literal sections of their interior volumes. The change in materials therefore reflects the interior spaces, not only providing contextual engagement but also acting as a public expression of Thompson's ongoing research.

The skillions on either side of the building are reminiscent of Alvar Aalto’s work, an influence on Thompson's design. These "bookends" not only draw reference with the chronology of the adjoining context but also serve a formal purpose by creating the outline for the built form.

== Awards ==
- RAIA Residential Multiple Award, 2002
