= House at Lake Connewarre =

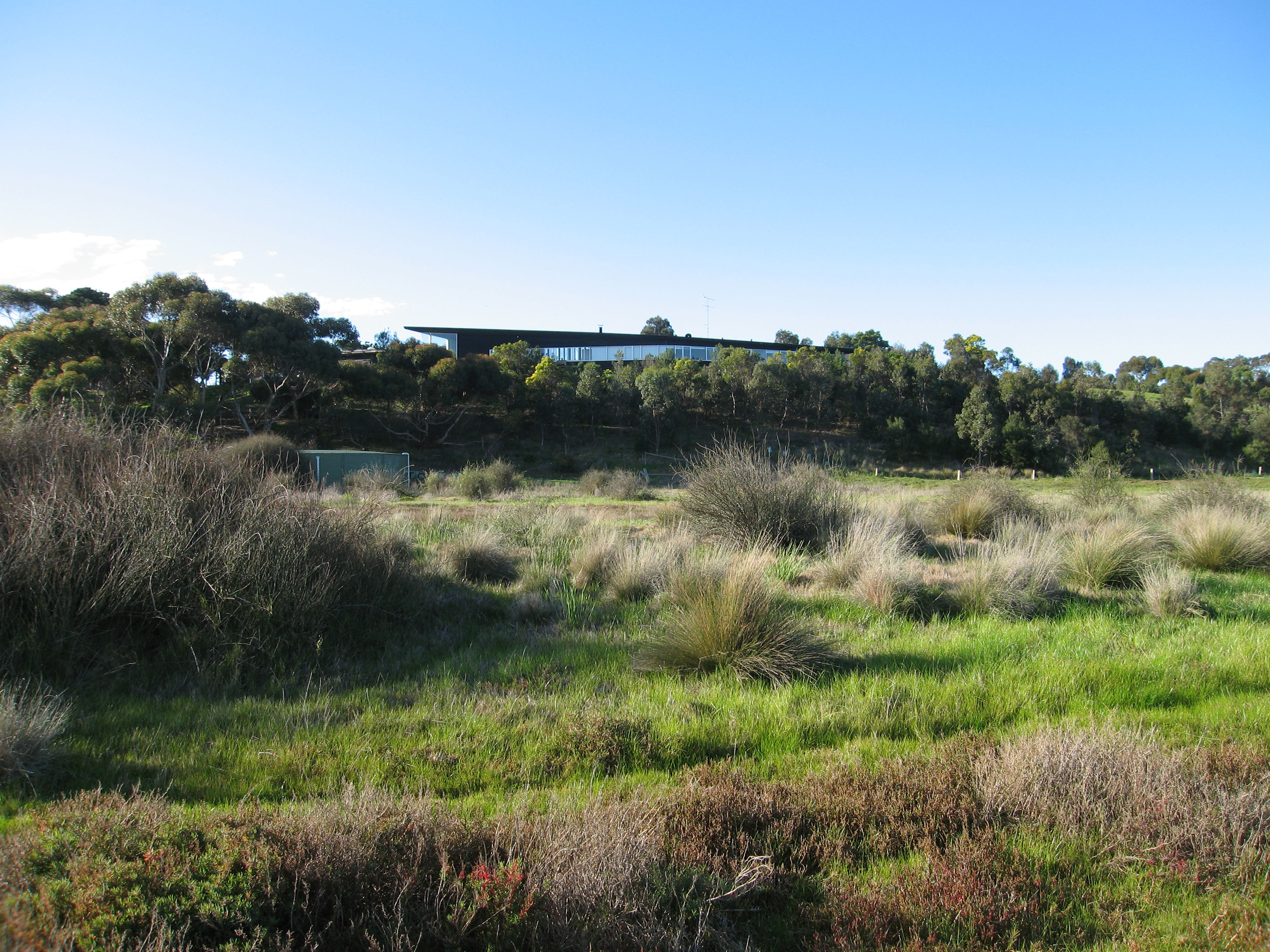
- Interactive map of the House at Lake Connewarre area

General information
- Type: Conventional house
- Architectural style: Contemporary
- Location: Lake Connewarre, Leopold, Victoria
- Coordinates: 38.209278°S 144.470364°E
- Construction started: 2002
- Governing body: Private

Technical details
- Floor area: 500 m^{2} (5,400 sq ft)

Design and construction
- Architect: Kerstin Thompson

Designed by Melbourne architect Kerstin Thompson from 1999–2002, House at Lake Connewarre is located in Leopold, Victoria. It is a house characterised by its black, flat, long roof blending into the landscape around Lake Connewarre. The architect described the house as “a simple gesture across the landscape”. The house is an attempt to create dialogue with nature in a poetic way and the house design is strongly influenced by the landscape.

== Site ==
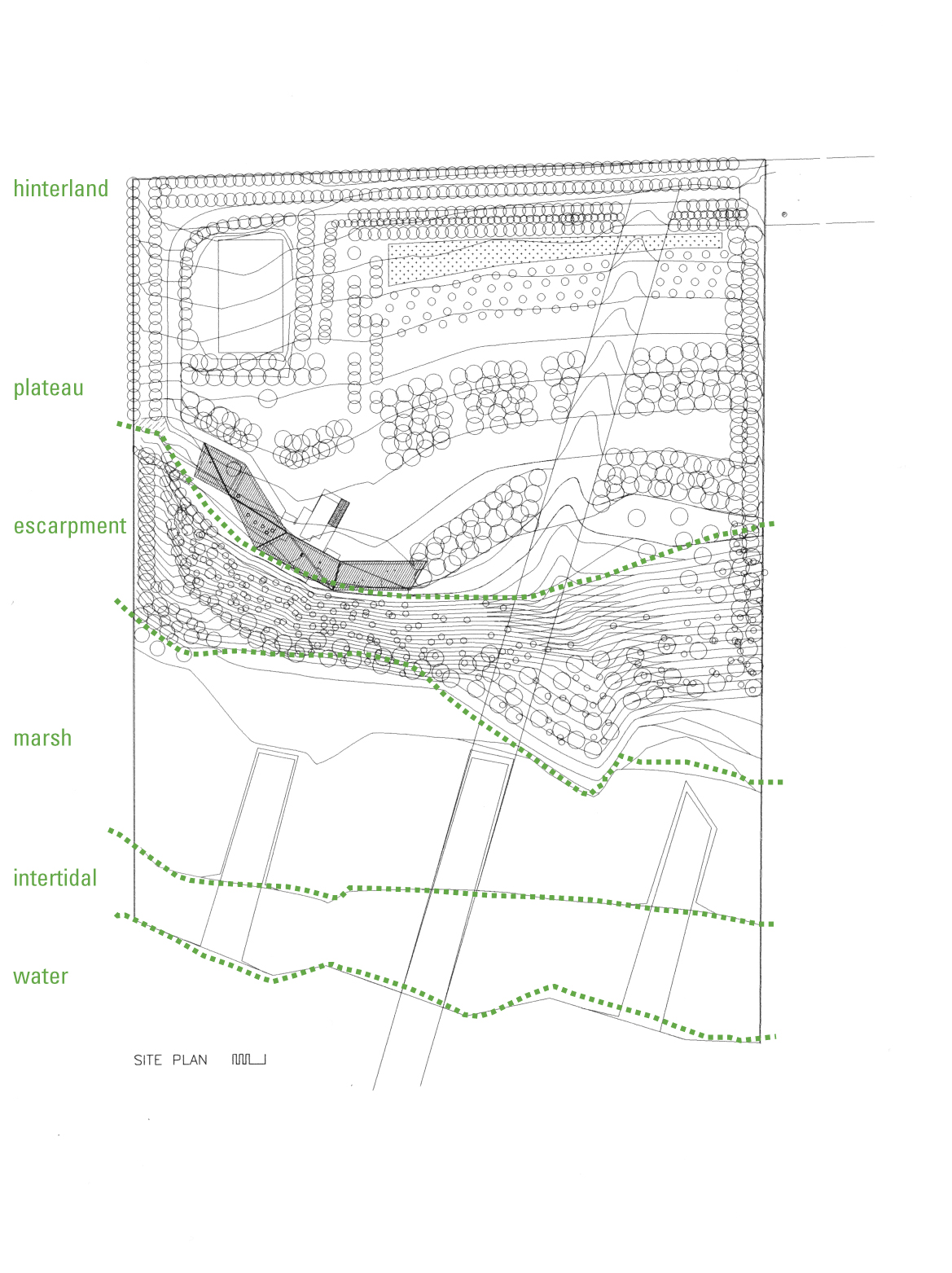
Site plan of Lake Connewarre

The site of House at Lake Connewarre is situated at the northern part of Lake Connewarre and 2.3 km apart from the center of Leopold, Geelong. The site of the house was originally an old degraded farmland with a tough landscape of shaggy marsh.

The house is built on a high ridge at the edge of the flatland and is located above the flooding line. To the north of the house is a large piece of flat abandoned farmlands. A continuous line of pine trees were planted to block the view towards the farmlands while a pathway is made to allow residents to get to the lake which is 100m south from the house.

== Design Intention ==
The architect, Kerstin Thompson, defines the house as “a simple gesture across the landscape”, where the simplicity and gesture translates to the finish and roofing, but in general it means poetry and a conversation with the nature. In this house, simplicity, beauty, and site, are key elements which the architect tried to achieve.

== Exterior ==
The house is divided into three programs under its folded roof form; guesthouse/recording studio, main house and garage, in a 500m2 area.

The structure is a low, black, flat and very long building which largely obscures the lake, appearing as a black smudge in the landscape and creating shadow surrounded by forest. The University of Queensland's Dr John MacArthur has stated that “the silhouette is similar to that of the black swans that occupy the lake. It forms a conversation with nature by adapting to its language as a part of landscape, a windbreak on the ridge, and an interval on the horizon.”

Following the ridge of the cliff, and shape of the land, the house is stretched to fill in the site and read as a sequence, instead of a singular form. The large plan of the house creates a territory and domestic interior with its linear architecture. Its position becomes a threshold between the new exotic northern front yard landscape, and the indigenous southern backyard flowing to the lake.

Based on the size of the house, the architect described it as ‘house-as-resort’, and ‘weatherboard shack’, as a way of describing the finishes and materials. The use of conventional construction methods allows this structure to be built without ostentation, and also without exceeding budget requirements for such a floor space.

Architect Kerstin Thompson has described the folded roof of the house as a’ translation of the plan, and a metaphor of an origami swan.’ The internal planning also follows the same procedure and produces the plan with the ceiling having the same geometry across the space. According to architecture critic and academic John P. Macarthur, the significance of this structure is not the ceiling, but the roof itself, which cannot be seen from caves, but sometimes from the ridge. The simplified roof gives the ability to read the internal plan, from the exterior.

== Interior ==
Different from the exterior, the interior of the house is not so conventional; it is a lot more simplified. The idea itself comes from the decision of Architect and client, to emphasise more the enclosure, rather than quality of finish. The difference of spaces between the pavilions is a means of framing views.

The use of plywood floor, and plasterboard lining is the continuation from the exterior cladding in a straightforward manner. The long, strip windows frame the views over the lake, and stretch the length of the exterior wall, which contains the major room.

The pool deck to the north side is clad with timber, and is inserted into the landscape front yard, and connects to the main house through a full height glass wall, which is designed to become a part of the interior experience of the house.

== Influence ==
Architect Kerstin Thompson has an ambition to blend houses with nature. The Lake Connewarre house is an attempt to create dialogue with nature in a poetic way and has site has strongly influenced the dwelling. The house has an architectural expression of a long but flat, one-storey massing which reflects the largeness and calmness of the lake and the flatland behind. Kerstin collaborated with landscape architect Fiona Harrison in this project to plant vegetation following the landscape to achieve the dialogue with nature.

== Awards ==
- Victorian Coastal Award for Building and Design (2005)

- RAIA Harold Desbrowe-Annear Award (2003)

== Gallery ==
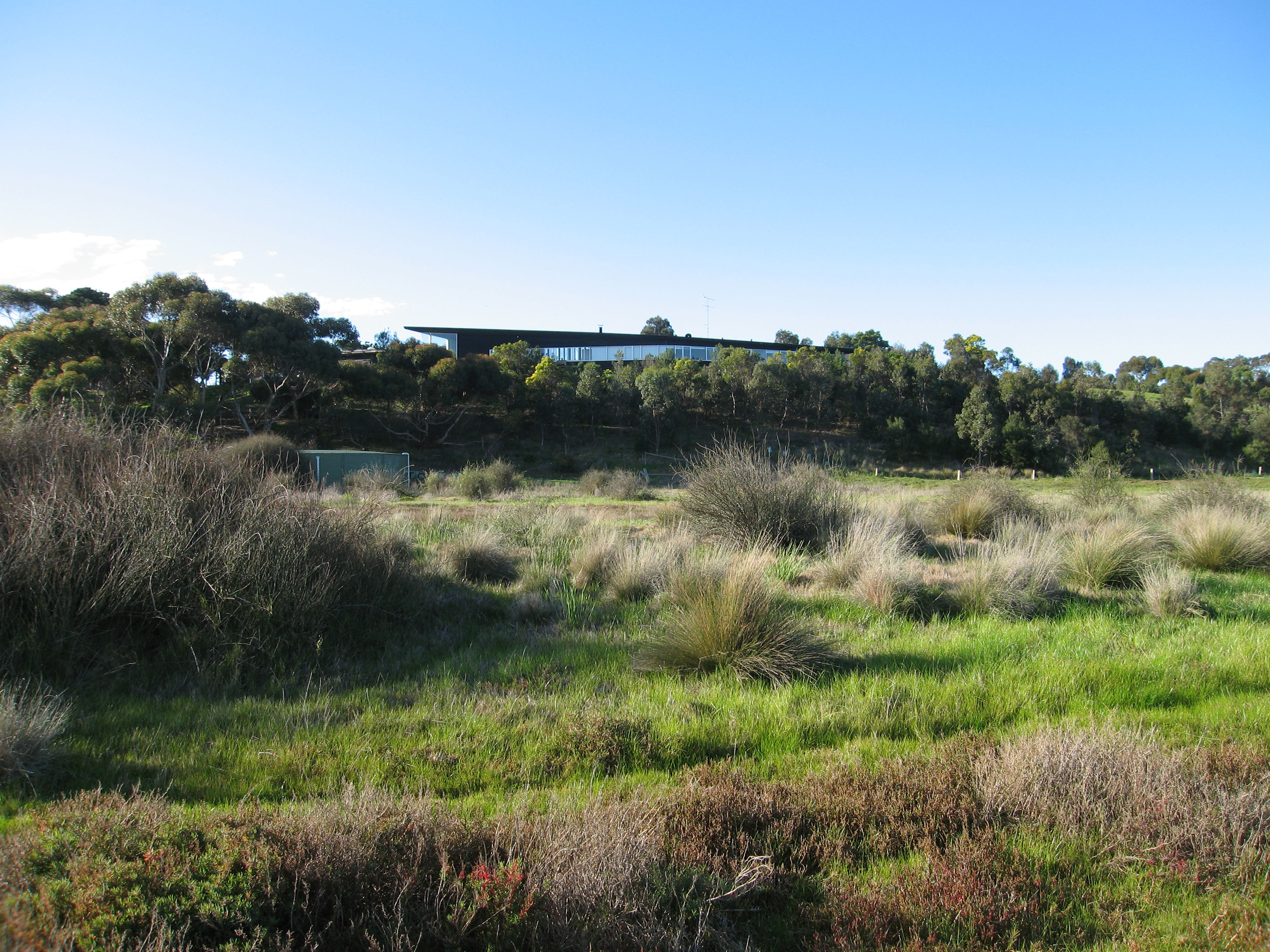

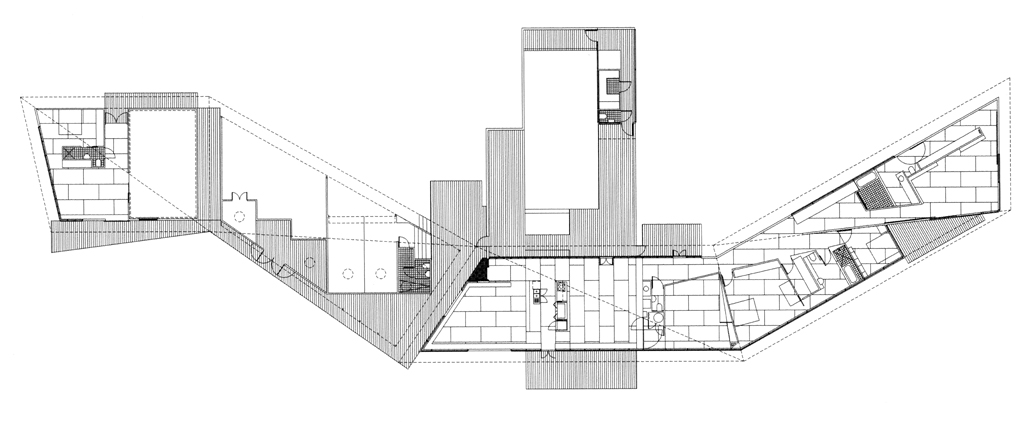

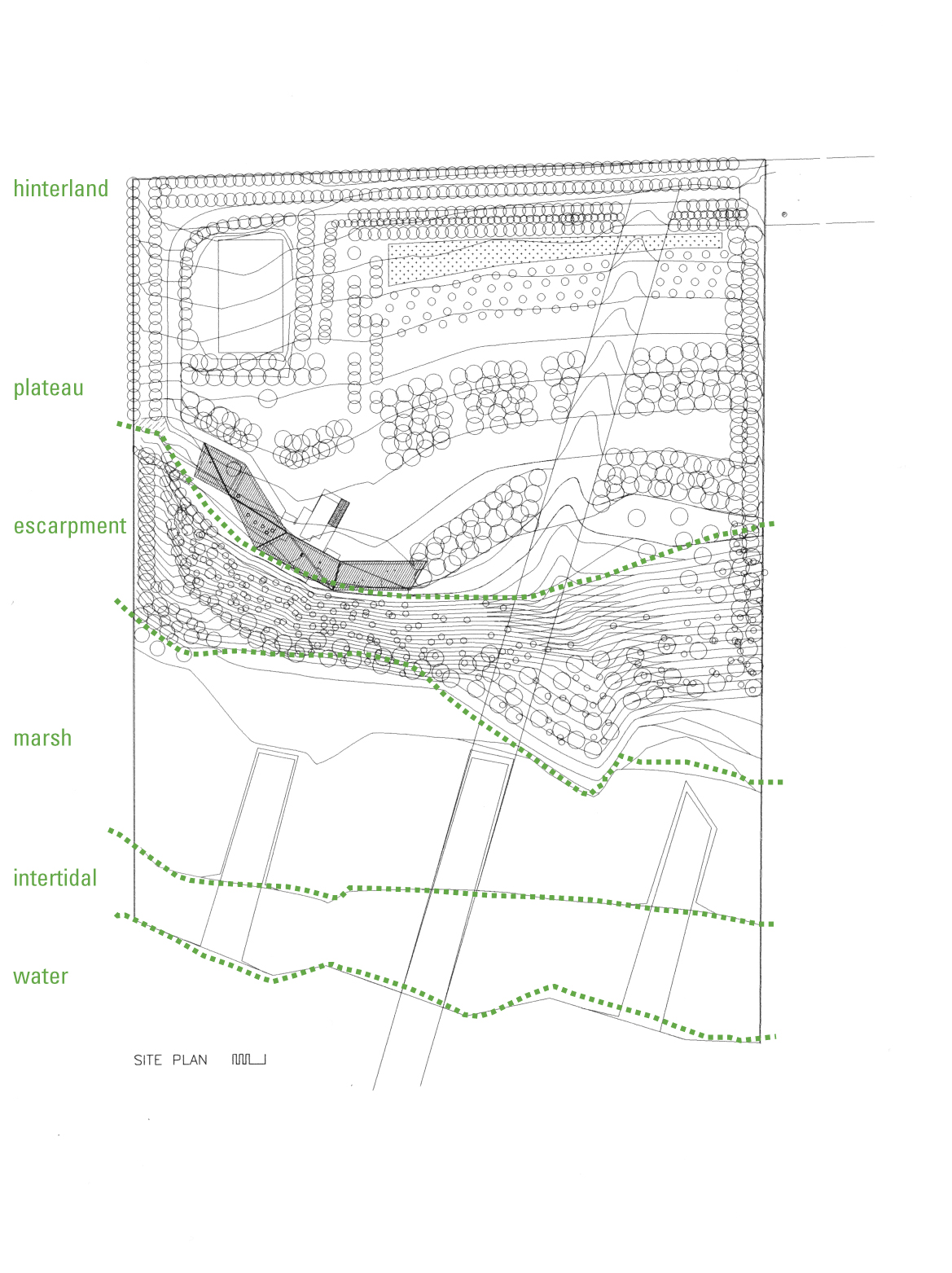

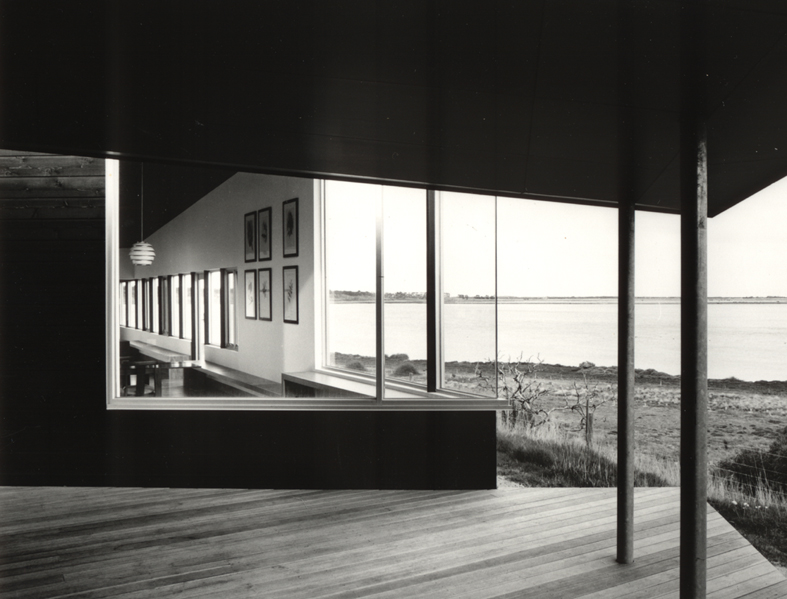

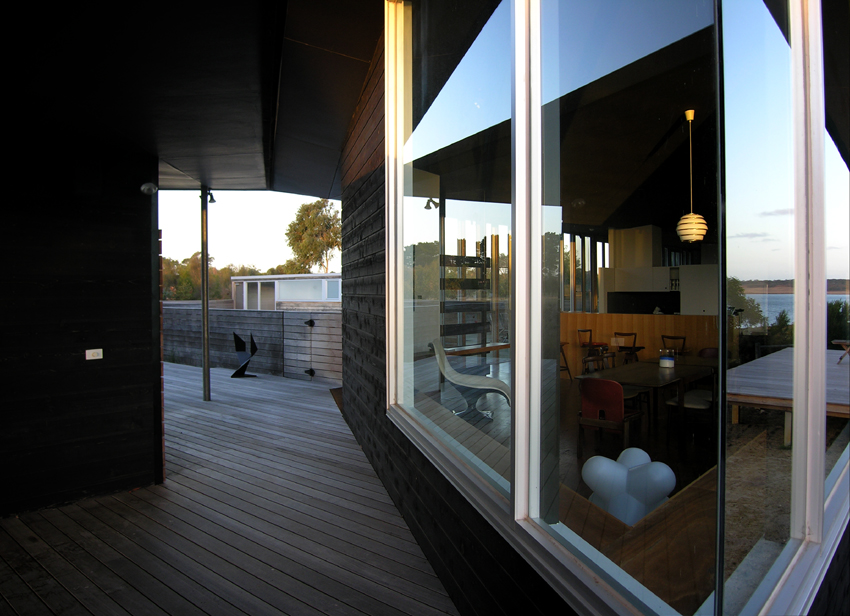
