= Colin Lanceley =

Australian artist

Colin Lanceley AO (1938–2015) was an Australian artist known for his large three-dimensional paintings and for his drawing and printmaking. His works are held in public collections worldwide including the Tate, the National Gallery of Australia and the Art Gallery of New South Wales. He was the inaugural chair of the advisory board of the National Art School and a board member of the National Gallery of Australia. He died on 30 January 2015 in Sydney.

== Early life ==
Colin Lanceley was born on 6 January 1938 in Dunedin, New Zealand. His parents were John Lassegue Lanceley, an Australian engineer of French and English descent, and Mary Anne Agnes Lanceley, née Ayers, of Scottish parentage. In 1939 the family moved to Sydney, Australia, where his father joined the Royal Australian Air Force for the duration of World War II.

Lanceley left school at the age of 16, and was apprenticed as a colour photographic engraver in the printing industry.

During this time, two nights a week he attended North Sydney Technical College evening art classes taught by Peter Laverty. He enrolled in the Art Diploma course at East Sydney Technical College and graduated in 1960.

== Career ==
=== Sydney – early work ===
In 1961, together with fellow East Sydney graduates Mike Brown and Ross Crothall, Lanceley formed the Annandale Imitation Realists, producing collaborative collages incorporating found objects. Their work was exhibited at Melbourne's Museum of Modern Art and in Sydney at the Rudy Komon Gallery.

Lanceley continued to work independently on mixed media collage paintings. Notable works of this period include The Greatest Show on Earth (1963), and Icarus I (1965).

=== London years ===
In 1964 Lanceley won the Helena Rubinstein Travelling Scholarship and the following year, together with his future wife Kay Morphett and her two children, he sailed for Europe to see its great works of art. After a brief stay in Tuscany with art critic Robert Hughes they moved to London, where they stayed for the next 16 years.

In developing his style of three-dimensional paintings, Lanceley absorbed the influence of the Modernists in art, and drew inspiration also from the poetry of T. S. Eliot and the music of Béla Bartók and Igor Stravinsky. In 1966 he was signed by British contemporary art gallery, Marlborough Fine Art, which gave him his first London exhibition, curated by Jasia Reichardt, and also showed him in New York. Notable works of this early London period, described by Robert Hughes as "transitional", included Icarus II (1966), The Miraculous Mandarin (1966) and Atlas (1967). He also worked with printmaker Chris Prater at Kelpra Studios and in 1976 a solo exhibition of his prints was held at the Tate gallery.

From 1967 onwards Lanceley and his family spent their summers in Europe, principally in Spain. A major influence at this time was the artist Joan Miró, who visited his London studio. Notable works of this period included The Object of All Travel Is to Arrive at the Shores of the Mediterranean (1971–72) and The Lark Ascending (1978). In 1968 critic Sandra McGrath, who promoted his work, donated his 1964 Gemini, to the Art Gallery of New South Wales. He twice won the Krakow Biennale prize for prints. His work was increasingly concerned with landscape, a turning point being Chablis (1980–81).

In the UK he taught part-time at the Bath Academy of Art and then at Chelsea College of Arts, where his colleagues included Howard Hodgkin, Patrick Caulfield and other artists.

Throughout these years Lanceley continued to visit Australia periodically for exhibitions of his work. In 1981, following another extended visit to Europe during which he received the Europe Prize for Painting in Belgium, he finally decided to return to Australia.

=== Sydney – later work ===
Back in Australia Lanceley brought his European experience to bear on his depictions of landscape and the unseen human presence within it. Notable paintings included What Images Return (1981–82), Where Three Dreams Cross Between Blue Rocks (Blue Mountains) (1983), The Fall of Icarus (1985), Songs of a Summer Night (Lynne's Garden) (1985) and Midwinter Spring (James' Garden) (1986).

In 1987 he was given a solo survey exhibition at the Art Gallery of New South Wales, and in the same year a book on his work was published with an introduction by Robert Hughes. In 1988 ABC Television produced a documentary, Colin Lanceley: Poetry of Place, directed by Andrew Saw.

Awards followed: the Order of Australia (1990), a Creative Arts Fellowship (a Keating government initiative) (1991), an invitation to deliver the Lloyd Rees Memorial Lecture (1993), and appointment to the council of trustees of the National Gallery of Australia (1994). In 1993 his exhibition at Sherman Galleries was opened by then Prime Minister Paul Keating.

Lanceley had returned with the idea of what a great art school could be, a place where students in all disciplines were taught by experienced practising artists. He advised Bob Carr, who became premier of New South Wales in 1995, on the transformation of his alma mater, the East Sydney Technical College, which was made independent of the TAFE system and transformed into the National Art School. In 1997 Lanceley became the first chair of its advisory board, serving in an honorary capacity, for more than two years.

New York dealer Allan Frumkin visited Sydney to see him, and held solo exhibitions of his work in New York in 1986 and 1993. In 1991 he was invited to lecture during an exhibition of his work at the Arts Club of Chicago, and in 2001 at the New York Studio School.

From the early 1990s Lanceley accepted a number of commissions. In collaboration with architect Philip Cox he designed mosaics for the Sydney International Aquatic Centre, Homebush (1994) and painted the ceiling of the later demolished Lyric Theatre, Sydney (1998). In Melbourne he created a large glass work for the County Court of Victoria (2002).

In the 2000s he exhibited for several years with Stuart Purves's Australian Galleries. Major works of this period included Burning Bright (Big Top) (2005), and Firebird (Stravinsky) (2006).

In 2022 the National Art School celebrated his life's work with the exhibition Colin Lanceley: Earthly Delights.

Lanceley's papers are held in the Research Library and Archive of the Art Gallery of New South Wales.

== Personal life ==
Lanceley met Kay Morphett while he was still a student at East Sydney, and they were together throughout the rest of his life, marrying in 1970 while in London. In addition to Kay's two children, the couple had two sons born in London.

In London and Sydney, he always maintained a studio in the family home. Writers, poets and journalists as well as fellow artists formed part of his circle, among them his close friends Shiva Naipaul and Al Alvarez and Australian expat journalists Phillip Knightley and Alex Mitchell. Artists who became his friends back in Australia included Lloyd Rees, Jan Senbergs and Lawrence Daws, whose Glass House Mountains home in Queensland became a holiday destination for the family.

In Sydney, Kay Lanceley, who worked at this time as an arts executive and public broadcasting publicist, decorated their house on Moore Park Road and then their studio home at Esther Lane with the couple's collection of art, ceramics and the artist's store of found objects. The family had beach houses successively at Coledale, Wombarra and Gerringong on the South Coast of New South Wales.

In his final illness, Lanceley gave interviews to Elizabeth Fortescue in which he spoke about his love of "the layering of human culture". In a further interview with his old friend Alex Mitchell he expressed his belief in the mission of the artist to be "released from the restraints of the culture around him and explore an idea which transcends that" and allow "the transmission of ideas and sensations and feelings from one person to another... to move somebody so that it's changed their view of the world."
