= Sandra McGrath =

American-born Australian art writer

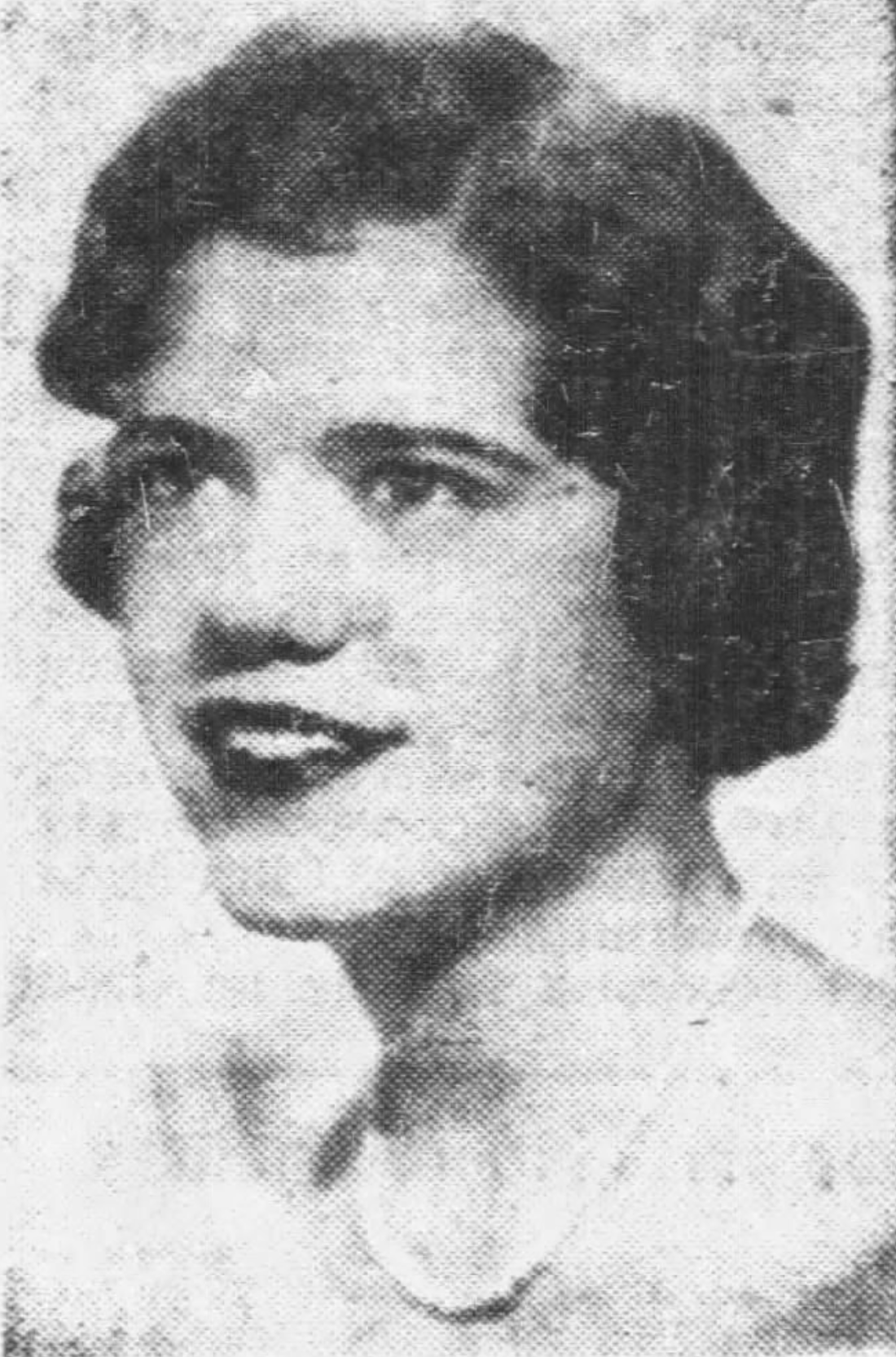
- Sandra Burt (Sandra McGrath) portrait at age 17 in the Birmingham Post-Herald of 31 December 1953
- Born: Sandra Burt; October 21, 1936; Birmingham, Alabama
- Occupations: art writer, historian, critic, patron and collector of Australian art
- Years active: 1966–1995
- Known for: McGrath, Sandra; Whiteley, Brett (1979). Brett Whiteley. Bay Books. ISBN 978-0-85835-369-5.

Sandra Burt McGrath is an American-born Australian art writer and historian, an art collector of the avant-garde, and a prominent art critic.

A well-traveled and wealthy socialite, McGrath, (née Burt) showed talent in writing and developed professional interests in the art market in her late teens, and after marrying her Australian husband in 1959 and while raising their five children in Sydney, she became an enthusiastic patron.

A friend of the younger generation of artists in her adopted country including John Olsen, Colin Lanceley, George Baldessin, Richard Larter, John Peart and Jeffrey Smart, she was an early biographer of Brett Whiteley in the influential first monograph on him. McGrath had begun art writing on art in her late twenties and was art critic for The Australian from 1972, the Sydney Morning Herald from 1987 into the 2000s, and from 1966, wrote for Art & Australia.

An active supporter of the Art Gallery of New South Wales, she donated significant works to its collection, and she built connections with commercial galleries, such as the Purves' family's Australian Galleries, that advanced the careers of emerging and establishing artists.

In the 1980s she collaborated on surveying themes of the desert and Sydney Harbour in art books with John Olsen and then Arthur Boyd, the latter leading to her and her husband's involvement in the creation of Bundanon.

After the publication of her last book, on Patrick Hockey (1994), and the death of her husband in 2000, McGrath returned to the United States, where two of her children, Eugenia and Julia, and later her grandson Patrick, established art galleries in New York. One of her sons is artist James McGrath.

== Early life and education ==
Sandra McGrath was born in 1936 to Anne Woodward Burt (Lundbeck after her later marriage to Hilmer Lundbeck, resident director of the Swedish American Line) and James M. Burt, Jr. in Birmingham, Alabama with interests in the Bank of Alabama. Frequently mentioned in the social columns throughout her youth, Sandra enjoyed a privileged background. She studied at Brook HIll, Birmingham for two years where she was treasurer of the Theta Kappa Delta Sorority in 1950, and wrote for the school yearbook the Brookelet Board.

The Birmingham Post-Herald of December 1953 featured her as 'Teen of the Week' with a brief profile of her as a senior student at Mount Vernon Seminary and College, Washington, D. C. and 'photography editor of Cupola, the yearbook and writer of a sports column for the school newspaper.' From September 1954 she attended Vassar College, where as a junior she was elected photography editor of its year book Vassarion.

Sandra graduated with a Bachelor of Arts on 9 June 1958, after which she traveled in Europe with her aunt. Her uncle and aunt, the Woodwards, entertained her and her future husband Michael Anthony ‘Tony’ McGrath in June 1959, before she set out to tour Tahiti, New Zealand and Australia on the SS Mariposa.

On 20 October 1959, aged 23, Sandra married Tony, who had graduated in business studies at the Universities of Sydney and Stanford University and was director of Mascot Industries in Australia. The Sydney ceremony was attended by Sandra's parents and brother who traveled on a later sailing of the Mariposa. She returned to see them for Christmas 1963 with her first child Eugenia.

== Emigration to Australia ==
By 1967 and in her thirtieth year, McGrath was an active commentator on Australian art. An affectionate 1967 profile in his column 'Our Town' in the Sydney Morning Herald by Leslie Walford reveals that McGrath was born in October 1936 and had started an art gallery in Jackson Square in San Francisco when she met Tony McGrath at a dinner party, and accompanied him to Sydney where they married and lived in an apartment in the Harry Seidler-designed 'Ithaca Gardens' in Elizabeth Bay, subsequently moving to a house in Woollahra, then to another flat with their children. Walford comments that:

Writing, in the way of critical analysis, is her passion, reading prolifically a daily habit and joy. For "Art in Australia" [sic] she has written essays on Brett Whiteley, Pop Art, and James Gleeson. Sandra knows Europe, loves Australia, where she finds a satisfying life. Collecting paintings is a passion--she worked at Clune Galleries too for a time. In the flat, she experiments with bold colours, good furniture, interesting ways to entertain. She is working for a Master's Degree in English, preparing a thesis on Nathaniel Hawthorne.

In 1969 McGrath donated John Olsen's oil painting Entrance to the Seaport of Desire, to the Art Gallery of New South Wales and through the gallery successfully organised cultural tours of Melbourne that had not previously been attempted. Veteran journalist Jane Fraser in a 2009 article in The Australian recalled her friendship with Sandra, through whom she met artists Arthur Boyd, Tim Storrier, Brett Whiteley, John Olsen and director of the Art Gallery of New South Wales, Edmund Capon:

She now lives in the US, from which she came, and was married to an Australian, now sadly dead. She was very homesick when she came here to live but she loved cricket because, she told me, she would listen to broadcasts of matches played abroad and be lulled to sleep by the voices of treasures such as Richie Benaud. She was new to writing and was fondly referred to by the editor as the menopausal cadet.

Sandra was further described in 1971 by Kay Keavney in The Australian Women's Weekly as 'lively young Mrs. Tony McGrath, American-bom graduate of Vassar, wife of a Sydney stockbroker, mother of four, art-lover and collector,' who had secured a program of free audits of Sydney University art history lectures for trainee guides the Art Gallery of New South Wales, instruction that, as of 2022, has continued. In August 1971 the last of their five children, Teague was born, joining siblings Eugenia, Anthony, Julia and James. The couple's involvement in the Sydney social scene as members of 'Serious Sydney Society', and their hosting of events attended by luminaries including Ita Buttrose, Rudi Komon, Justice Elizabeth Evatt, Harry Seidler, Shiela Scotter, Zara Holt, Susan Renouf, Harry M. Miller, and visitors from overseas like Franz von Bayern, and Stan Hart, was frequently noted by newspaper columnists.

When Australia's economy was subject to the OPEC oil shocks, with a 17.7% annual CPI movement and ‘stagflation’ recorded in 1974, The Bulletin’s Daphne McGuinness in an article ‘Pulling in their Gucci belts,’ interviewed rich women for their reactions, including Lady Clarke of South Yarra, ‘Australia’s richest woman,’ and McGrath was another. Identified as ‘heiress and art collector’ she remarked that in New York, from where she’d just returned ‘Everybody is in the money, the art scene has never been more extravagant, really…Glad to be back? Oh God am I glad to be back. Never want to travel again. This is Lotus Land.’

== Collector ==
Walford notes in 1967 that the McGrath apartment was decorated with a painted ceiling (later sold and moved to serve as a mural in a house in Avalon) and tapestry by John Olsen, The Cricket Match, a painting by Brett Whiteley, and a large sculpture by Colin Lanceley. In 1971 Art and Australia featured a Max Dupain photograph of the skylit dining room of their Bellevue Hill house painted on all walls with a Jeffrey Smart landscape of geometric forms seen through tall dry grass. In 1975 Sandra auctioned some of her art collection of Australian, European and American paintings, and furniture, including the Whiteley Cricket Match through Ellenden Auctioneers at her Woollahra residence at 12 Trelawney Street. McGrath was generous in her donations of works to the Art Gallery of New South Wales.

== Art writer ==
Sandra was art critic for The Australian from 1972, The Sydney Morning Herald from 1987 into the 2000s, and from 1966, wrote regularly for Art and Australia, and was a broker of relationships between artists, patrons, galleries and their public; in one instance in 1977 she visited Jeffery Smart in Tuscany to persuade him to join the 'stable' of Ann and Stuart Purves' Australian Galleries. Of Smart, in 1969 she wrote:

...despite the twentieth-century trend to abstract art and Abstract Expressionism, a few painters continued to wrestle with the real world, to struggle with the forms and structures and problems of the twentieth century. One such notable painter is Jeffrey Smart.

In 1973 McGrath was appointed Australian representative on the International Council of the New York Museum of Modern Art with her friend Penny Seidler, and Anne Lewis, joining James Fairfax. McGrath became closely associated with Brett Whiteley, whom she 'met in the early sixties, when he returned to Australia to mount his first large exhibition which included the Christie paintings and the London Zoo Series.' She records that 'it was Whiteley who inspired the second magazine article I published...which appeared in June 1967 issue of Art and Australia. With the election of Gough Whitlam's Labor government in 1972 Sandra and Brett Whiteley drove 'through town in his Jeep with three of his funny-looking dogs and the music blaring, shouting and screaming and hitting the horn.' She considered the 1970s:

a golden age of Australian art in Sydney and Melbourne. Everything was exploding culturally and politically. The era of Menzies and Dobell and Drysdale was finally over. Sydney was shedding its old colonial-backwater shell, as the Opera House was revealing new ones.

Her 1979 book Brett Whiteley, dubbed The Blue Book' for its dust jacket featuring the painter's The Jacaranda Tree, was the first major text on the artist. John Tranter welcomed the biography in which 'Ms. McGrath dips her pen into the purple ink,' but noted 'its faults: no index, some misspellings, a catalogue (of 129 black-and-white reproductions) that appears incomplete, but we are not told by how much, nor why; colour plates that are occasionally faulty or out of register, and in many details from paintings, badly blurred; and incomprehensibly - no list of illustrations. But it's a vivid and exciting book to read, and at the price it's good value for money.'

Joanna Mendelssohn advised that; 'As long as this book is accepted as being nothing more nor less than an interpretation of Whiteley by a friend, it can be seen as a valuable historical document. For it is a most successful evocation of Whiteley’s mannered hedonism, his sensuous pleasure in landscape and the human body and his eager exploration of the dark side of human experience.' In 1992 Annette Van den Bosch, who elsewhere calls McGrath a 'kingmaker', observed that 'The major Sydney reputation forged in the late 1970s market was that of Brett Whiteley. After he won the Archibald Prize in 1977 for Double self portrait, Whiteley won a succession of prizes and had a string of sell-out exhibitions. Sandra McGrath’s practices as a critic quite explicitly linked concepts of masculine creativity, genius and international reputation in relation to Whiteley’s work. From the perspective of 1995 and against Barry Pierce's new book catalogue, SMH reviewer Elizabeth Cross winced at 'unrestrained excesses' in McGrath's writing.

Published in 1982, The Artist and the Desert, co-written by McGrath with artist John Olsen, on whose work she first wrote in 1976, was considered by reviewer Dr. Ann Galbally a 'worthwhile exercise' in its examination of twenty-two painters 'to confront and illustrate the question [of] what has the desert landscape meant to the Australian artist,' its thesis being 'that the desert is really the "soul" place for the Australian psyche.' Galbally identifies 'a perceptive piece of writing which stands out in the otherwise rather uneven text, [in which] we are told that:'

In European landscapes, man is always there, has been there, in the foreground, in the middle distance or in the background. By contrast, in the Australian desert there seems to be no place for man at all; there seems no past, no present and no future; only an overwhelming withering of will and a numbing sense of despair.

From experience of husband Tony's career Sandra was to write in 1983 a four-part series on merchant banking for The Australian newspaper, and the couple capitalised on canny real estate purchases; their three-bedroom cottage in Ebor Road, Palm Beach was bought by Carla Zampatti in 1972 for $51,500; the Collins Avenue, Rose Bay house they owned in the 1970s sold in 1989 for $4.15 million; and their Dover Heights clifftop residence, excluding its massive Michael Snape sculpture, was sold in 1993 for $1,775,000, the then-highest auction price for the suburb.

In summer 1971-2, Arthur Boyd and his wife Yvonne visited the McGraths at their property Bundanon on the south coast of New South Wales, which they owned with art dealer Frank McDonald. The Boyds purchased nearby Riversdale on the banks of the Shoalhaven River in 1974 and then bought Bundanon from McDonald and the McGraths in 1979. Sandra's son James McGrath began his art career as studio assistant to Boyd.

Over 1982-83, David Chalker, federal ministerial adviser to Tom Uren and manager of the Nolan Gallery at Lanyon in Canberra, with his wife Margaret assisted McGrath with research for her publication The Artist and the River, praised by Bernard Smith as 'a most valuable account of Arthur Boyd's work since his return to Australia after a period of almost 20 years abroad...[and] his preoccupation with the Shoalhaven River,' and as a 'particularly personal book in that it is, as the author tells us, her expression of gratitude to the artist for his work, in that it made her—an American—aware, for the first time, of the beauty of the Australian bush. "Where others see harmony, I have seen disorder, where others see beauty, I have seen ugliness; where others see grandeur, I have seen pettiness; where others see bright colors, I have seen dull greens and greys". Smith raises McGrath's reaction as an instance of the problem of 'to what extent is it possible to see scenery except through the eyes of other artists?'

McGrath continued prominently as a member of the Sydney social set through the 1980s, protesting the encroachment of properties on Sydney Harbour, itself the subject of her 1979 Sydney harbour paintings from 1794 a compilation of works by 38 painters, and joining fundraising committees for charities. She was on the special committee to select works of art for the Darling Harbour redevelopment chaired by Neville Wran with the State Gallery director Edmund Capon, journalist Lenore Nicklin, stockbroker and art collector Rene Rivkin, and Bob Pentecost, general manager of the Darling Harbour Authority.

Through her reviews, McGrath promoted the work of a number of then lesser-known Australian artists including Tony Coleing, Vivienne Pengilley, Peter Taylor, the 'reticent' Tony Tuckson, and Peter Tully. In 1982 on what The Bulletin slated as a 'bear' market for art, she scolded:

I don’t see any young artists that anyone is excited about. Buyers are rediscovering expatriate artists such as Colin Lanceley and William Delafield Cook but there are no young ones around who excite the public the way Brett Whiteley and Tim Storrier did. There are some good photo-realists around but while...admired, it is not bought. No one is buying adventurously and even in good times the people who do are rare birds. Dealers [are] increasingly being knocked by the sale of art at auction. Another problem for the dealer was that the number of serious collectors had not increased...[and] very few obsessive collectors who will get something from every show that an artist has.

== Whiteley dispute ==
A 1992 updated edition of the Whiteley book, with an interview with the artist that McGrath recorded in 1990 and Whiteley's own thoughts on his art, then being released as a paperback two months after his death, was the subject of a 24 September hearing in the Federal court to examine whether allegedly offensive material–letters and notes made by Whiteley in Sydney and while holidaying in Morocco–infringed the copyright of R.D.Laing, Charles Baudelaire, Albert Einstein, Georges Braque, Jean Cocteau, Arthur Rimbaud, Plato and Rembrandt, as claimed by solicitors for stakeholders in the artist's estate. They also asserted that Whiteley's assent for colour reproduction of his works in the first, hardback edition would not cover the monochrome reprints in the new paperback. The publicity attracted such attention that the new edition required five print runs to meet demand, though the publisher's agent Tom Thompson challenged journalist Andrew Main to 'let us know' if he found any 'offensive' passages. Ensnared in the controversy and after the court in October 1992 ordered the withdrawal of the paperbacks, Thompson resigned under pressure from Angus & Robertson. Crime writer Susan Geason in 1996 considered that:

Sandra McGrath's book – Brett Whiteley – is as good as you'll get on the paintings, I suspect, and it's a complete mystery why the Whiteley women had the revised edition pulped. Apart from a paragraph or so about the existence of The Mistress, it's totally harmless. Hell hath no fury...

McGrath started to write another, more extensive Whiteley book with interviews of his friends and associates including Bob Dylan before HarperCollins, an imprint of Angus & Robertson, withdrew their interest, while others including Graeme Blundell, Blanche d'Alpuget, Frannie Hopkirk, Barry Pierce, and Janice Spencer drafted or published further biographies.

== Return to America ==
In 1994, Sandra had released her biography of Patrick Hockey, completed after his death in 1992, and with husband Tony, holidayed in her American home town. Nevertheless, she remained still high in the attention of the Australian art world; in 1998, when Timothy Potts was appointed director at Fort Worth's Kimbell Art Museum, Susan McCulloch, advising arts editor Deborah Jones at The Australian, rumoured that Potts had benefitted because McGrath was on the board of the Kimbell, though Sandra had never held such a post.

Sandra's husband Tony died on 5 August 1999 in Sydney and in March 2000, McGrath returned to her home town to attend the reception celebrating the naming of the Eivor and Alston Callahan Gallery of Indian and Southeast Asian Sculpture at the Birmingham Museum of Art. Since then, she has resided 2008-2017 in Park Avenue New York and 2007 onwards in parts of Stuart, Florida.

In February 2002, the McGrath daughters, Eugenia Korrosy and Julia Colman, opened their McGrath Gallery in a renovated brownstone at 9 77th street, Manhattan opposite Leo Castelli Gallery, and near Gagosian Gallery and Central Park, the first Australian gallery to open in the Madison Avenue art district after Maureen Zembera's Tambaran Gallery and others in Soho and Chelsea. Charles Sheard, was their first exhibitor, and also showed at the Tim Olsen Carr Gallery run by the John Olsen's son Tim and Michael Carr, in Paddington.

In 2011, the year marked by the death of Bundanon associate Frank McDonald, Sandra, then aged 75, flew to Sydney for the opening of her son James's exhibition at Tim Olsen Gallery, joined by her eighty-three year old friend John Olsen just recently recovered from heart surgery. Sandra's brother James Marshall Burt Ill died in 2016.

McGrath Gallery (Downtown) moved to 611 Broadway, Suite 721, in SoHo, founded and operated by Sandra's grandson, Patrick McGrath, who operates it as a combined design firm and art gallery accessible by appointment. It recently hosted a major exhibition titled ICONS: Antiquities, Jean Prouvé and Bruce Weber, which was extended into January 2026. Patrick McGrath also maintains a gallery presence on the parlour floor of his townhouse on the Upper East Side, where he introduces new designers and artists to his network.

== Offices held ==
- Councillor of the Art Gallery of New South Wales
- Member of The Museum of Modern Art International Council
- Member of special committee on art for the Darling Harbour redevelopment
- Advisor to the Regional Art Galleries Association of Victoria

== Donations of art ==
- Colin Lanceley (1964) Gemini, sculpture, painted wood, metal, mixed media. Gift of Mrs M A McGrath 1968. Art Gallery of New South Wales
- George Baldessin (1969-1970) Banquet for no eating no 2 with singular seating arrangement, Gift of Mr and Mrs M A McGrath 1970. Art Gallery of New South Wales
- Richard Larter (1965) Dithyrambic painting no 6, Gift of Mrs M A McGrath 1972. Art Gallery of New South Wales
- John Peart (1965) The aspects regard one another, synthetic polymer paint, oil on canvas and hardboard. Gift of Mrs M.A. McGrath 1968. Art Gallery of New South Wales
- John Olsen (1964) Entrance to the Seaport of Desire, Acrylic on canvas

== Selected articles ==
- McGrath, Sandra, 'Times Square is Pop Art', Art and Australia, Vol. 4 Issue 1, 1966, 66-69
- _________, 'Profile: Brett Whiteley,' Art and Australia, Vol. 5 Issue 1, 1967
- _________, 'Profile: James Gleeson,' Art and Australia, Vol. 5 Issue 3, 1967
- _________, Jeffrey Smart,' Art and Australia, Vol. 7 Issue 1, 1969
- _________, 'Where I am up to - an article on Colin Lanceley, Art and Australia, Vol. 7 Issue 2, 1970
- _________, ‘The return of Robert Hughes’, The Australian, Canberra, 1 July 1972
- _________, "SPORT The fastest is the most beautiful". The Bulletin. 095 (4863). Haynes and Archibald: 51. 21 July 1973. ISSN 0007-4039.
- _________, ‘Two City Schism’, The Australian, 3 November 1973
- _________, 'Sold short at the Biennale', The Australian, 1 December 1973
- _________, 'At Coventry Gallery', The Australian, March 8, 1975, p.4
- _________, 'Is there a female aesthetic?' The Australian 2 July 1975: 18.
- _________, 'Less urgent', The Australian, 21 September 1977
- _________, 'A tough intellectual stringency.' Australian Weekend Magazine 17-18 June 1978
- _________, 'Portrait of the artist on the wagon.' The Australian, August 5-6, 1978
- _________, 'Satire that goes to the Heart', The Australian, 23 August 1978
- _________, ‘Gruesome thoughts on the individual’, Weekend Australian, Canberra, 16 Sept 1978
- _________, ‘On the State of the art …’, Weekend Australian, Canberra, 23–24 Sept 1978, p 6
- _________, ‘Golden veteran of abstract art’, The Australian, 16 June 1979
- _________, ‘Hangovers and Gunfighters' in The Australian, 19 February 1980
- _________, ‘Marriage of Minds—50 Years On.’ Australian, 21-22 June 1980, p 12
- _________, ‘A gentle eye from Rome’, The Australian, Canberra, 27 Oct 1980, p 10
- _________, ‘It’s a question of horses for courses,’ The Weekend Australian, 8 November, 1980
- _________, 'Nolan's love affair with China', The Weekend Australian, 7 March 1981
- _________, 'Perspecta ’81.' The Weekend Australian 30-31 May 1981
- _________, ‘French unveils his sinister circus’, in The Australian, 15 August 1981
- _________, 'Turning the banal into the sensational', The Australian, 29 May 1982
- _________, 'Colorful Change in Landscapes.' The Weekend Australian 18-19 June 1983, Magazine p.12
- _________, 'Space-aged without being spaced out', The Australian, 11 December 1983
- _________, 'Place Conveyed as State of Mind', The Weekend Australian, 18 February 1984
- _________, 'Art World’s Fluctuating Fortunes.' The Weekend Australian (magazine) 12-13 May 1984: 10.
- _________, 'Melbourne gives an Olympian salute to Nolan', The Bulletin, p.78, 16 Jun 1987
- _________, 'Brett Whiteley’s ‘Alchemy.’” Quadrant 22 (9): 32–35. 1978
- _________, 'Unsung Olympian’, The Bulletin, November 1988
- _________, ‘Image maker explores a freudian landscape,’ The Australian, 19 March, 1995

== Book publications ==
- McGrath, Sandra; Gunn, Grazia; Catalano, Gary (1978). The work and its context: six attitudes in Australian art. Sydney, New South Wales: Visual Arts Board of the Australia Council.
- McGrath, Sandra; Whiteley, Brett (1979). Brett Whiteley. Bay Books. ISBN 978-0-85835-369-5.
- McGrath, Sandra; Walker, Robert (1979). Sydney harbour paintings from 1794. Jacaranda Press. ISBN 978-0-7016-1254-2.
- McGrath, Sandra; Olsen, John, John (1981). The artist & the desert. Sydney: Bay Books. ISBN 978-0-85835-497-5.
- McGrath, Sandra (1982). Tony Tuckson, a Retrospective Exhibition. Sydney: Watters Gallery and Margaret Tuckson.
- McGrath, Sandra; Boyd, Arthur (1982). The artist & the river : Arthur Boyd and the Shoalhaven. Sydney: Bay Books. ISBN 978-0-85835-570-5.
- McGrath, Sandra (1994). Patrick Hockey, his life and work. Sydney: Beagle Press. ISBN 9780947349097.
