= Ivan Durrant =

Australian artist, performance artist, and writer

- Born: 1947 (age 78–79); Melbourne, Australia
- Education: Self-taught
- Known for: Painter, performance artist, writer
- Movement: Realism (art), Photorealism

Ivan Durrant is an Australian painter, performance artist and writer. Known for creating art with "great shock value", such as the 1975 "Slaughtered Cow Happening" outside the National Gallery of Victoria, Durrant is often described as the enfant terrible of Australian art. The larger proportion of Durrant's work consists of paintings using a self-developed style of "Super-Realism".

Durrant now resides in Blairgowrie, Victoria, and his works are held in many public collections.

== Early years ==
Born in Melbourne in 1947, Ivan Durrant was one of seven children. His father suffered from alcoholism, a factor leading to the decision by Ivan's 22-year-old mother to place the children into state care. From ages seven through 15, Durrant was raised in an orphanage in Brighton, Victoria. He was dealt regular beatings, and suffered emotional abuse - "even medical experimentation. He can remember being injected with all sorts of things, even when he wasn't sick". Whilst still alive, neither of Durrant's parents ever visited their children in the orphanage. During those years, Durrant spent his summers on farms where he was billeted to work for the summers. It was during that period that Durrant realise his fondness for birds and animals Durrant says that he has "always had a love of looking at the structure of animals".

Ivan began drawing during his years at the orphanage, with his art providing some social advantage for him. "The 16-year old senior boys, they would look after me and I wouldn't be bullied because I could do drawings in their books for them, so art became my thing". Durrant's ability to draw developed into an interest in painting during his teenage years.

Georges Mora, of Tolarno Galleries, St Kilda was among the first to see potential in Durrant's work, giving him $300 in cash to buy paints, and his first exhibition in 1970.

== Career ==
=== Technique ===
Durrant's painting technique began in a childlike, folksy, naïve art style, evolving into paintings of extreme Photorealism, which has come to be referred to "supraphotolism" (meaning to work 'above and beyond the photo'), and sculptures of illusionistic still-lives of butchered meats, pigs’ heads and all. Durrant spent a short time working in a prosthetics laboratory at Royal Melbourne Hospital and was able to create lifelike body parts. This skill was carried over into an ability to create convincingly accurate sculptures of ears, hands, pig heads and various cuts of meat. Durrant's most recent works explore the colours and action of Australian Rules football. His work has ranged from paintings to photography, public performance and installation art, short films and sculpture.

=== Artistic periods and themes ===
1968 - 1970: Farm Life
1970-1972: Flinders Horses and Landscapes - reflections of the period during which Durrant lived in the coastal town of Flinders, Victoria.
1973: Unreal Realism - first movement into Realism (arts)
1974: Movie stars period
1975: Jockeys - First Photorealism show
1976: New York - Awarded Art Council of Australia Artist in Residence, New York City
1978: Butcher shop and Pigs Heads Exhibition - Beginnings of Meat period
1979: Meat Paintings
1981: Meat Paintings, Hawthorn Art Gallery - Photographic Exhibition of Meat
1982: Hamilton - Travelling Exhibition of Meat Paintings; United Artists Gallery Beginnings - more meat paintings
1984: United Artists Gallery - Fuck Art Period: Graffiti photographs of Pine Gap and Meat - response to changes in Uranium Policy. Included Uranium, you're standing in it exhibition.
1986: United Artists Gallery - Chernobyl Deformities Exhibition - Deformed babies theme
1988: United Artists Gallery & Regional Gallery Tour - Interiors of Sheds
1992: Westpac Gallery - Retrospective Exhibition
1994: Survey of 70s Racing Paintings
1995: Australia Felix Arts Festival, Benalla and Sheds
2002 - 2005: Cows
2007–present: Boundary Rider

=== Art happenings ===
==== Beverley The Amazing Performing Cow - The Slaughtered Cow happening ====
Durrant is renowned for confronting the public through film, sculpture, performance exhibitions, and social realist paintings of the 1970s and 1980s. Much of his work has been based on concepts relating to socio-political themes; for example animal rights or the social effects of war. "A lot of his art did have a great shock value". On 26 May 1975, Durrant dumped the carcass of a "freshly slaughtered cow" on the forecourt of the National Gallery of Victoria. In an interview with ABC Online, Durrant's daughter says that installations and performance art were still a very new form of artistic expression, and "to have something as extreme as an animal carcass put at the National Gallery of Victoria was just totally shocking to people".

Prior to the event, Durrant had discussed with close friend and mentor, abstractionist artist Asher Bilu, the concept of 'a more confrontational art 'happening' - to kill a cow before an audience'. 'The concept included actively drawing in the mass media to cover the event, thereby pushing it beyond the realm of high art'. Initially, the event was to take place at the Alexander Theatre, at Monash University. The public was to be the unwitting audience to the slaughtering of a cow named Beverley. The performance was described in a flyer as 'a real cow actually performing on stage'.

The event was leaked to the press on 23 May 1975, and was front-page news the following day. As a result, Monash University banned the event, and 'the media were on alert'. On the morning of 26 May 1975, Beverley was slaughtered in a cattle yard in Wheelers Hill, 'not far from where the Monash Gallery of Art stands today,' was then 'loaded onto a utility van, and with news crew in tow' was driven to the NGV, her carcass dumped in the forecourt.

The media coverage of the event was the most significant aspect of the performance, for 'in order to make a real impact, something about the performance needed to be identified (if not accepted) as art'. Durrant informed the staff at the NGV front desk that he was donating a sculpture, and 'asked whether they would consider leaving it in place for a few days'. The performance coincided with the opening of the gallery's 'first blockbuster exhibition, 'Modern Masters: Manet to Matisse', which was opening that night'. The NGV arranged for the carcass to be promptly removed and the site thoroughly cleaned before 'the scrum of Melbourne's social elite arrived'.

The happening was aired on the evening news nationwide, and made newspaper headlines the following day. The public response was 'one of outrage and disgust' and the art world was outraged at the claim that 'the cow was "art"'. Durrant was charged with 'depositing litter - to wit a dead cow', with Durrant pleading not guilty 'on the basis that Beverley was not litter. Durrant was fined $100, with the magistrate describing the event as 'an act of ego'.

The event was, in part, a statement about societal "failure to confront the reality of killing ... in contemporary society in the West".

The event was later interpreted as "a response to the life-wasting Vietnam War, but particularly the direct connection between life and death. Each of us, he argued, must ‘take responsibility for [their] own actions. If we are going to eat meat a cow dies for that. And we have to face it.'" Durrant's daughter states that she once considered such an interpretation (in relation to the Vietnam War) "a bit of a retrospectively applied stretch," but adds that "the cow endures as a metaphor for the inhumanity and carelessness with which we treat life generally and the extent to which we can become complacent and inured to this. Mass public outrage at a cow being slaughtered on the 6p.m. news threw into stark relief our preparedness to overlook far worse horrors."

==== The Severed Hand happening ====
Similar controversy surrounded Durrant's works of sculptural realism. An exhibition of what appeared to be a severed hand at Hogarth Galleries in Sydney received wide press coverage, leaving Sydney in "an uproar". The hand was, in fact, an intricately detailed synthetic polymer resin sculpture.

==== 1976 - "Chopping Block" 16mm filmed pigeon dinner event ====
Twelve guests were invited to a last supper at Durrant's Brighton home where they learned at the table that they were to prepare their own dinner - Durrant's pigeons. Guests were told that if they wished to eat, they had to slaughter their own pigeon at the table. This event, like other similar happenings demonstrated the point that "as humans we tend to dissociate animals from the whole process of killing". A film was made of the event, which was shown at the Dendy Cinema, Brighton; White Street Theatre, New York in 1976; and also at the Museum of Modern Art, New York in 1976.

== Selected exhibitions and prizes ==
Year	Exhibition title or venue
2013	Semi-finalist, Doug Moran Prize
2011	Rainbow Cowboy, Performing Arts Centre, Wangaratta Art Gallery; Landscapes and Horses, Mornington Peninsula Regional Art Gallery, Victoria
2010	Boundary Rider, Wangaratta Art Gallery; Boundary Rider, Ararat Art Gallery, Ararat, Victoria
2009	Awarded Sulman Prize, Art Gallery of NSW; Soft Sculpture, group exhibition, National Gallery of Australia
2008	Basil Sellers Art Prize and Exhibition, Ian Potter Museum of Art, Melbourne University; Boundary Rider, Ballarat Fine Art Gallery
2007	Boundary Rider, Benalla Art Gallery; Boundary Rider, Latrobe Regional Gallery
2005	Paddock to Plate, Rockhampton Art Gallery
2004	Paddock to Plate: Durrant 1968-2004, Major survey, Monash Gallery of Art, Victoria; Racing Paintings, Australian Racing Museum, Champions, Federation Square, Melbourne
2003–2005	Rainbow Cowboy Toured nationally
2002	The Cow Show, Shepparton Art Gallery; The Cow Show, Benalla Art Gallery - I'll Kill It - You Cook It, Ballarat Art Gallery
1998–2001	The Great Shed Show, Toured nationally
1995	Sheds, Benalla Australia Felix Arts Festival
1994	A Day at the Caulfield Races, Caulfield Arts Complex, Victoria
1993	The Great Australia Light Show, Shed installation and paintings, Benalla Art Gallery, Victoria
1992	Realist Survey 70's-90's, Benalla Art Gallery; Realist Survey 70's-90's, Westpac Gallery, Melbourne - Realist Survey 70's-90's, Shepparton Art Gallery
1991	War - There are no artists, only arseholes with paint: installation, United Artists Revisited (Galerie Chez Nous), Melbourne; Heads and Sheds, Ray Hughes Gallery, Sydney - Realist Survey, Benalla Art Gallery
1989	Heads and Sheds, Luba Bilu Gallery, Melbourne
1988	White Light - Black Spaces, Shed paintings touring exhibition to Regional Art Galleries, Victoria
1986	United Artists Gallery, Melbourne
1985	Hogarth Galleries, Sydney; United Artists Gallery, Melbourne
1984	United Artists Gallery, Melbourne
1982	Meat Works, Hamilton City Art Gallery; United Artists Gallery, Melbourne
1981	Hogarth Galleries, Sydney; Meat Works, Hawthorn City Art Gallery
1979	Survey 8, National Gallery of Victoria, Melbourne; Tolarno Galleries, St Kilda, Melbourne, Victoria
1978	Tolarno Galleries, St Kilda, Melbourne, Victoria
1975	Tolarno Galleries, St Kilda, Melbourne, Victoria
1974	Hogarth Galleries, Sydney; Tolarno Galleries, St Kilda, Melbourne, Victoria
1973	Tolarno Galleries, St Kilda, Melbourne, Victoria
1972	Tolarno Galleries, St Kilda, Melbourne, Victoria
1971	Tolarno Galleries, St Kilda, Melbourne, Victoria
1970	Salamanca Place Gallery, Hobart; Tolarno Galleries, St Kilda, Melbourne Victoria - His first exhibition "featured pleasing, optimistic farm scenes with a preponderance of cows - recalling his youthful residencies at dairy farms in the Shepparton area"

== Awards and honours ==
Sourced from and

Year	Prize Name
1975	Awarded Maude Vizard-Wholohan Prize, SA Awarded Caulfield Arts Centre Acquisition Art Prize
1976	Art Council of Australia Artist in Residence, New York City
1980	Awarded Australian Film Institute Awards "Best Experimental Film": Self Portrait Blood Red
1994–1995	Artistic Director Australia Felix Arts Festival, Benalla
2009	Awarded Sir John Sulman Prize, Art Gallery of New South Wales

== Public collections ==
Durrant's work is held in the following public collections:

- The National Gallery of Australia, Canberra
- National Gallery of Victoria
- The Art Gallery of South Australia
- The Art Gallery of Western Australian
- Queensland University
- Rockhampton Art Gallery, Queensland
- Shepparton Art Museum, Victoria
- Geelong Art Gallery, Victoria
- Gippsland Art Gallery, Victoria
- Latrobe Regional Gallery, Victoria
- Caulfield Arts Complex, Victoria
- Benalla Art Gallery, Victoria
- The Art Gallery of Ballarat
- Hamilton Art Gallery, Victoria
- Bendigo Gallery, Victoria
- Horsham Art Gallery, Victoria
- ICI Corporate Collection
- NAB Collection
- British Museum Department of Prints and Drawings
- Mornington Peninsula Regional Gallery, Victoria

== Other work ==
=== Films ===
1975 - Mad Dog Morgan, Special effects
1976 - Chopping Block: 16mm, pigeon dinner event, MOMA & White Street Theatre, New York
1977 - Long Weekend, Special effects; -Red Dog, 16mm, Alpine Dingoes
1980 - Self Portrait Blood Red, Meat Landscape, Awarded Best Experimental Film, Australian Film Institute Awards
1983 - Horse, 16mm, surreal dream

=== Autobiography ===
The Insiders - A reflection of childhood days spent at orphanages and farm stays. All characters created by Ivan Durrant : Published by Bent Records, Copyright 1995, Benalla, Vic.

=== Australia Felix Arts Festival, Benalla, 1995 ===
To date, the festival remains the largest coming together of artists, poets, and writers in Australia. The festival was a two-week-long event, with 120 exhibiting and visiting artists; and 40 performing poets.

=== Essentials Magazine ===
Ivan Durrant is a regular contributor to Essentials Magazine, a Victorian High Country magazine dedicated to culture, culinary and adventure content.

== Publications ==
Year of Publication	Author and Publication Details
1976	Quadrant, Front Cover.
1976	McNeil, David, 'The Dead Hand of Art', Arts Melbourne Vol. 1, No. 2, June 1976.
1979	Linsday, Robert, Survey 8 Catalogue, National Gallery of Victoria.
1981	Phipps, Jennifer, 'Recent Artists: Film in Australia', Flash Art Milan, No. 101, Jan/Feb edn.
1982	Australian Independent Film, Australian Film Commission, November.
1982	A History of Australian Art, Educational material (slides)
1989	Thomas, Daniel, Outlines of Australian Art: The Joseph Brown Collection, 3rd edn, Macmillan, South Melbourne.
1994	Eagle, Mary and Jones, John, A Story of Australian Painting, Macmillan, Sydney. Notes on Back Cover: "A history based on the ...ICI Australia collection"
1996	Mancini, Anne, Australian Perspectives on Art: An issues based approach, Addison Wesley Longman Australia, Melbourne.
1997	Aland, Jenny and Darby, Max, Australian artLook, Rigby Heinemann, Port Melbourne.
1998	Chamberlin, Lou, Art Smart, McGraw-Hill, Sydney.
2000	Murray Cree, Laura and Drury, Nevill (eds), Australian painting now, Craftsman House, North Ryde.
2004	Morrison, Kirsty (ed), Eat Art, National Gallery of Australia, Canberra
2004	Thomas, Daniel - 'Fleshly moralities: Ivan Durrant in Melbourne', Art Monthly Issue 172, August.
2011	Durrant, Jacqui, 'Public understandings and private metaphor in Ivan Durrant's 'the cow', Art and Australia, Vol. 48/3.
2011	McCullough, Tom, 'Landscapes and Horses: Ivan Durrant', Artlink, Vol 31, No. 2.

== Personal life ==
Resides in Blairgowrie, Victoria
Married to Judy Durrant
Children: Jacqui Durrant; Jamie Durrant

Breeds and races pigeons.
Breeds cattle.
Worked in an abattoir to put himself through matriculation.
In 1969, Durrant became the first Victorian ward of the state to gain a bachelor's degree (Monash, BEc).

== Related artists and associations ==
In the mid 1970s: Durrant exhibited in New York with the American Realists Chuck Close, and Janet Fish.

== See also ==
- Art of Australia
- Asher Bilu and United Artist Galleries
- Chuck Close
- Janet Fish
- Georges Mora and Tolarno Galleries
- Mad Dog Morgan
- Johnny O'Keefe "Death and Legacy"
- Little band scene
- Sir John Sulman Prize
- List of Australian artists
