= Bundanon =

Art museum and education centre in New South Wales, Australia

Coordinates: 34.8890°S 150.5003°E

Bundanon is a national arts organisation situated near Nowra, City of Shoalhaven, New South Wales, Australia. It was the home of the painter Arthur Boyd and his wife Yvonne Boyd, also an artist. The centre was established in 1993 after the Boyds gifted their property and announced their intention to establish the Bundanon Trust. It has subsequently received funding from the Australian Government.

In 1999, the Arthur and Yvonne Boyd Education Centre, was completed, to the prize-winning design of Glenn Murcutt. Bundanon's facilities expanded in 2022 with the opening of a new art museum and bridge to the designs of Kerstin Thompson Architects, which also won architectural awards.

== History ==
Bundanon Homestead

The Bundanon properties are located on the land of the Wodi Wodi people of the Yuin nation, who speak the Dharawal language. From the mid-19th century, the Shoalhaven River supported many farm properties and provided a mechanism for European occupants to bring their produce to the coast for sale.

European occupation was established at Bundanon in 1831 through a grant of 600 acres (240 ha) made to Richard Henry Browne. The land grant was conditional on the clearing of 55 acres (22 ha), which were to be fenced and cultivated within five years. This work was not completed and the property was sold to Kenneth Mackenzie on 19 March 1838. From the available evidence Bundanon Homestead, completed in 1866, was constructed using well-detailed machine-sawn timber in the roof, floors, and ceilings.

Bundanon's history as a farm property is still evident in many of the buildings on site, including those that were re-purposed and restored to form the vibrant Artist in Residence complex.

=== Arthur Boyd at Bundanon ===
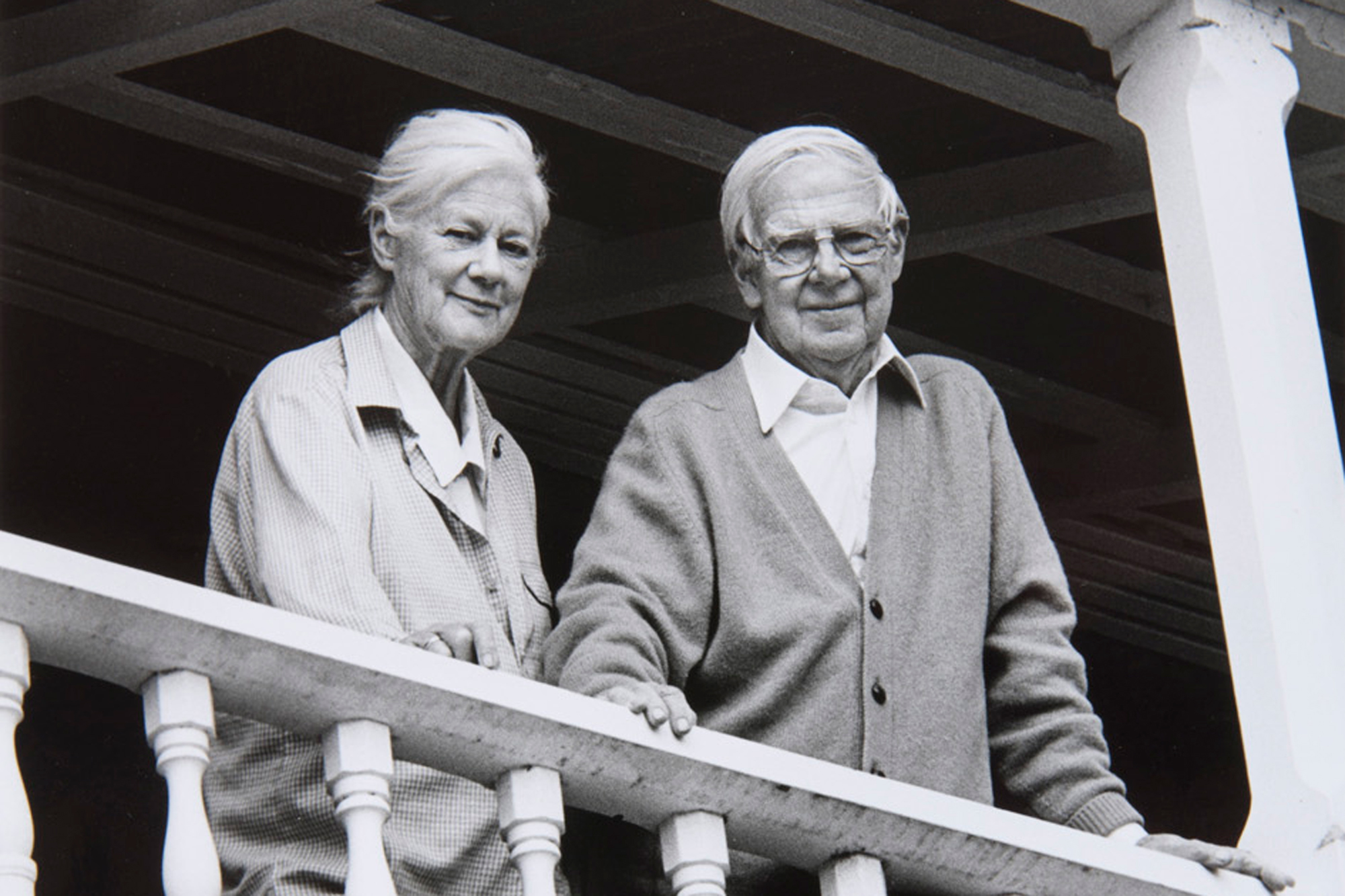
Arthur and Yvonne Boyd at Bundanon 1990s

In the early 1970s, artist Arthur Boyd purchased Riversdale on the banks of the Shoalhaven River near Bundanon and added to the buildings to create a home and studio. Arthur and Yvonne Boyd purchased Bundanon from Sandra and Tony McGrath and Frank McDonald in the summer of 1979.

After building a studio at Bundanon in 1982, Boyd painted a series of large, Shoalhaven images based on the river and bush around Bundanon. He was commissioned to design the tapestry for Great Hall of New Parliament House and created 16 canvases for the foyer of Victorian Arts Centre.

=== Establishment of Bundanon Trust ===
At the memorial service for Sir Sidney Nolan on 28 January 1993, Prime Minister Paul Keating announced the Australian Government's acceptance of Arthur and Yvonne Boyd's gift of Bundanon and the intention to establish the Bundanon Trust. The gift included three properties – Bundanon, Riversdale, Eearie, and Beeweeree) – as well as an extensive collection of artworks. Trustees were established by the Australian Government to oversee the operation of Bundanon Trust.

The directors in the early years of the trust's formation benefited from the input of Arthur and Yvonne Boyd and developed an ambitious vision for Bundanon's future. They commissioned internationally-acclaimed architecture, established the Bundanon's world-renowned Artist in Residence program and opened the Bundanon properties to the public. Bundanon has given Australia a cultural and environmental asset. It was born out of Boyd's often stated belief that "you can’t own a landscape", and the wish that others might also draw inspiration from the remarkable place.

== Description ==
Bundanon is near Nowra, within the City of Shoalhaven in New South Wales.

The organisation creates learning programs for students of all ages, and promotes the value of landscape.

== The collection ==
A significant part of Arthur and Yvonne Boyd's 1993 gift of Bundanon was an extensive collection of artworks by Arthur Boyd and his family, in addition to works by Sidney Nolan, Brett Whiteley, Joy Hester, and Charles Blackman. The collection today includes contemporary work from previous artists in residence, commissions, and generous donations.

In the 2019–2020 Black Summer bushfires, many of the artworks were evacuated from the Bundanon property and stored in Sydney to ensure their safety. The collection returned to Bundanon at the end of 2021 with the completion of the new art museum, which includes facilities to store and protect the artworks.

== Architecture ==
=== Education centre ===
The first award-winning architectural project built at Bundanon was the Arthur and Yvonne Boyd Education Centre, designed by Pritzker Architecture Prize-winning architect Glenn Murcutt with Wendy Lewin and Reg Larkin in 1997. The building has a 32-bed dormitory and an outdoor amphitheatre for 350 people. Completed in 1999, the building won both the 1999 Sir John Sulman Medal for public architecture in New South Wales and the 1999 Sir Zelman Cowen Award for Public Architecture. Author and architecture critic Philip Drew review described the siting of the building as "... placement of the hall on its acropolis is reminiscent of an ancient Greek temple. The formal character of the building, its sensitive acknowledgement of the landscape, despite the modern materials such as corrugated iron for the roof, which could not be less Greek, is strange and unexpected."

=== Art museum and bridge ===
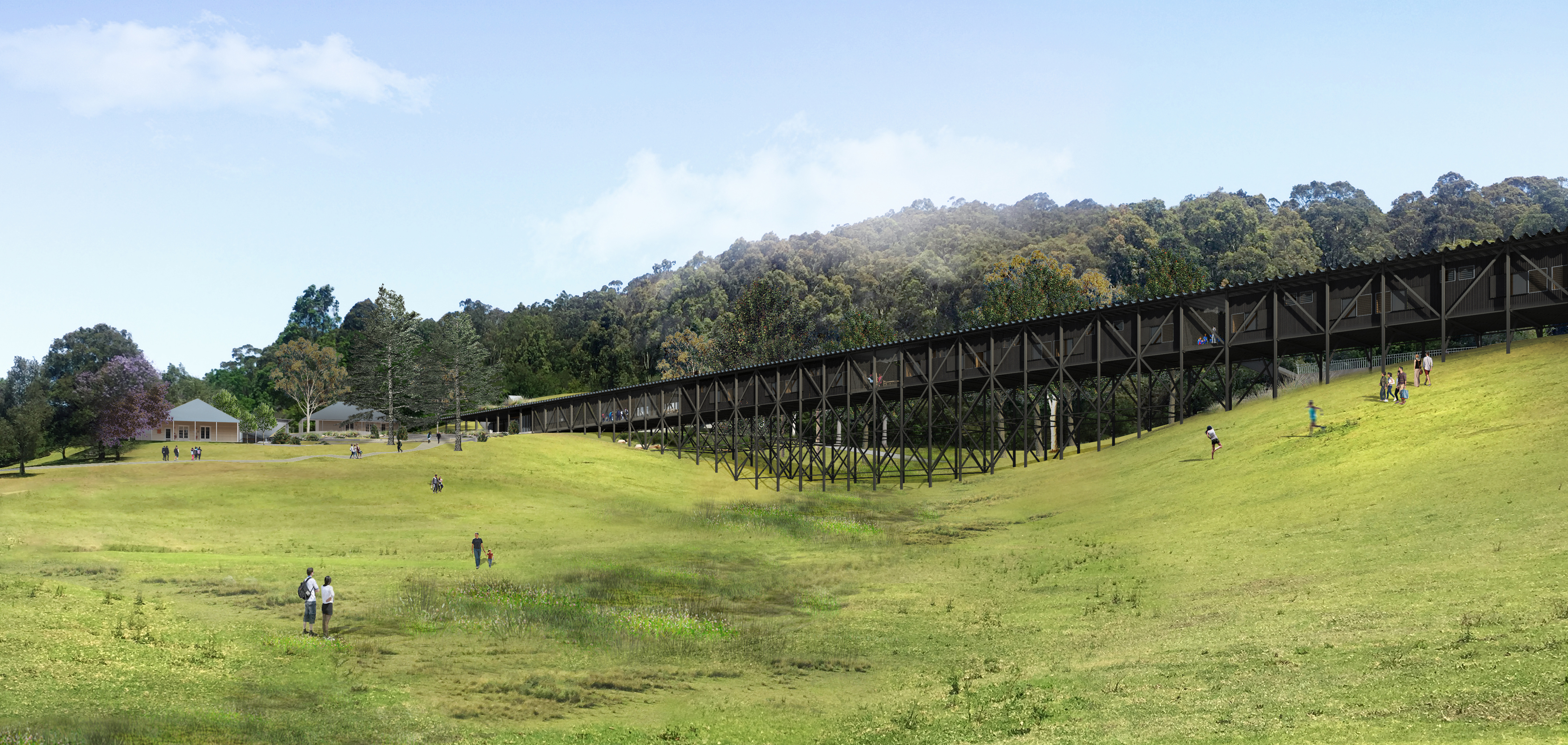
Render of the new art museum and The Bridge

In 2020, construction of a new contemporary art museum on Bundanon's Riversdale property was announced. Partially buried in the landscape, the new museum development sits at the centre of the new plan for Bundanon, with a bridge structure landing onto an expansive public plaza near the existing nineteenth century buildings. Kerstin Thompson Architects (KTA) developed a new plan for Bundanon with new architectural additions. Included are an art museum and "The Bridge", which houses the creative learning centre for school students, a visitor information centre, accommodation and a café.

In 2022 Bundanon was awarded a second Sir John Sulman Medal, the highest award for public architecture in New South Wales. The new Bundanon art museum and gallery officially opened on 5 March 2022.

Later in 2022 KTA won the national Sir Zelman Cowen Award for Public Architecture for the art museum and bridge.

== See also ==
- Australian art
- Boyd family
- Sulman Medal
