= Kerstin Thompson =

Australian architect (born 1965)

- Born: 1965 (age 60–61); Melbourne, Victoria, Australia
- Education: Royal Melbourne Institute of Technology
- Occupation: Architect
- Years active: 1989–present
- Awards: RAIA Gold Medal 2023, William Wardell Award 2025, Sir Zelman Cowen Award for Public Architecture 2022, Sir John Sulman Medal 2022, Melbourne Prize 2022, Robin Boyd Award 2020, Victorian Architecture Medal 2020
- Practice: Kerstin Thompson Architects
- Projects: Bundanon Art Museum & Bridge, Melbourne Holocaust Museum, East Street House, Broadmeadows Town Hall
- Website: kerstinthompson.com

Kerstin Thompson (born 1965) is an Australian architect. She is the principal of Kerstin Thompson Architects (KTA), a Melbourne-based architecture, landscape and urban design practice with projects in Australia and New Zealand. She is also Professor of Design at the School of Architecture at Victoria University of Wellington, New Zealand, and adjunct professor at RMIT University and Monash University.

== Career ==
Kerstin Thompson's career as an architect commenced with studies at Royal Melbourne Institute of Technology (RMIT) where she earned her Bachelor of Architecture degree in 1989. During her undergraduate studies she worked in the Milan-based studio of Matteo Thun (1987) and the Melbourne-based practice of Robinson Chen (1988–89). In 1990 she worked for Perrott Lyon Mathieson Pty Ltd as an Assistant Site Architect for the Telecom Corporate Tower project. From 1990 to 1994 she was a lecturer in architectural design at RMIT. In 1998, Thompson completed a master's degree in Architecture at RMIT.

In the decade from 2000 to 2010, Thompson's projects broadened to include civic projects. The first of many emergency and community services buildings received recognition including local, national, and international shortlistings. During this decade, Thompson's design thinking was the subject of exhibitions, and a significant body of critique, ‘New Trends of Architecture in Europe and Asia-Pacific’,‘Living in the Modern: Australian Architecture’. The National Portrait Gallery's inclusion of KTA in “Thinking about Architecture and Portraiture” by Dr Christopher Chapman, in 2009.

In 2005, Thompson was appointed as the Creative Director for the RAIA National Conference and one of the Creative Directors for Australia's 2008 Venice Biennale exhibition, Abundant Australia. Her contribution to education was recognised by her appointment as an adjunct professor in architecture at RMIT in 2009. Thompson was appointed as a member of the Federal Government's BEIIC Advisory Committee in 2008.

In years from 2010 to 2020, Thompson's academic contribution was recognised by appointments to Monash University as an adjunct professor in architecture (2012—) and to Victoria University Wellington as Professor of Design in Architecture (2010–2018). Her contribution to the profession was recognised by appointment as a Life Fellow by the Australian Institute of Architects in 2017. Thompson's design leadership was also recognised by her appointment as a panel member of the Victorian Design Review Panel (VDRP) with the Office of the Victorian Government Architect in 2012. Thompson has also curated multiple exhibitions, including ’Architectural Urbanism: Melbourne/Seoul’, “Diverse Practice” Exhibition and Symposium at Victoria University of Wellington and ‘Repair: Australian Pavilion’ at the Venice Biennale 2018.

As part of her ongoing engagement in the industry, Thompson continues to write and deliberate on ethics and design, 'Spatial Continuums: Linear, Radial, and Clustered Architectures in Practice’ ‘The Burden of Landscape’, Architect Victoria, ‘Feeling Climate’ Architecture Australia and ‘Museum as Place-maker’. Her commitment also extends to various speaking opportunities including Keynote Speaker, Heritage Address Open House Melbourne, Symposium Contributor, RMIT ‘Edmond and Corrigan + Peter Corrigan: INFLUENCE’ and Robin Boyd Foundation: Ethics of Architecture.

== Notable projects ==
- 2001 — Napier Street Housing, Fitzroy, Victoria, Australia; RAIA Residential Multiple Award, 2002
- 2003 — House at Lake Connewarre, Leopold, Australia
- 2010 — Monash University Museum of Art, Melbourne, Victoria, Australia
- 2019 — East Street House, East Albury, New South Wales, Australia; Robin Boyd Award, 2020
- 2021 — Bundanon Art Museum & Bridge, Illaroo, New South Wales, Australia: Sir John Sulman Medal, 2022 and Sir Zelman Cowen Award for Public Architecture, 2022
- 2022 — Melbourne Holocaust Museum, Elsternwick, Victoria, Australia; National Award for Public Architecture, 2023
- 2022 — Queen and Collins Development (with BVN); Melbourne Prize 2022
- 2025 — Eva and Marc Besen Centre at the TarraWarra Museum of Art, Healesville, Victoria; William Wardell Award for Public Architecture, 2025

== Publications ==
- Architecture and Angels: Shifting Grounds’, Exedra – Architecture, Art & Design, vol. 5, no. 2, 1994.
- ‘Architecture and Angels’, Kerb Journal, RMIT University, Melbourne, 1996.
- ‘Detail in the Work of Guilford Bell: A Problem of Evidence’, in L van Schaik (ed.), Bell: The Life and Work of Guilford Bell, Architect 1912–1992, Bookman Press, Melbourne, 1999.
- ‘Interstitial Practices’, in L van Schaik (ed.), Interstitial Modernism, RMIT University Press, Melbourne, 2000.
- ‘Gradient Architectures’, Architecture Australia, vol. 90, no. 3, May/June 2001.‘House-street-relationship-house-street-district-city (smithsons)’, in G London & S Anderson (eds), Take 7: Housing Australia: How Architects Can Make a Difference, The Royal Australian Institute of Architects, Canberra, 2008.
- ‘Affinities’, in R Boyd, Living in Australia, revised edition, Thames & Hudson, Melbourne, 2013.
- ‘More Than’, Architectural Review Asia Pacific, Issue 131, 2013.
- ‘10 Lessons’, Parlour, 14 March 2014, <archiparlour.org/10-lessons/2014>.
- ‘Beyoncé or Barak: Is It a Real Choice?’ ArchitectureAU, 1 September 2015,<architectureau.com/articles/beyonce-or- barak-is-it-a-real-choice>.
- ‘Design Negotiations’, in D Bates, V Mitsogianni & D Ramírez-Lovering (eds), Studio Futures: Changing Trajectories in Architectural Education, Uro Publications, Melbourne, 2015.
- ‘Single House – No Future?’ Architecture Australia, vol. 105, no. 1, Jan/Feb 2016.
- ‘The Burden of Landscape’, Architect Victoria, Summer 2017.
- ‘Spatial Continuums: Linear, Radial, and Clustered Architectures in Practice’, in P Sparke, P Brown, P Lara-Betancourt, G Lee & M Taylor (eds), Flow: Interior, Landscape and Architecture in the Era of Liquid Modernity, Bloomsbury Visual Arts, London, 2018.
- ‘Dignity with a Modesty of Means’, in V Mitsogianni & P Macasaet (eds), Influence: Edmond & Corrigan + Peter Corrigan, Uro Publications, Melbourne, 2019.
- ‘Feeling Climate’, Architect Victoria, Autumn 2020. ‘Museum as Place-maker’, in G Lindsay (ed.), Contemporary Museum Architecture and Design: Theory and Practice of Place, Routledge, New York, 2020.
- ‘Small Public: Relativities’, Architecture Australia, vol. 109, no. 4, Jul/Aug 2020.
