= Asher Bilu =

Australian artist

Asher Bilu אשר בילו
- Born: 16 December 1936; Tel Aviv, Israel
- Known for: Painting, sculpture, installation art
- Movement: Abstract art
- Awards: Blake Prize (1965); First Leasing Prize (1970)

Asher Bilu (Hebrew: אשר בילו; born 1936) is an Australian artist who creates paintings, sculptures and installations. He has also contributed to several films by Director Paul Cox as production designer. He was born in Israel, and began his career as an artist soon after arriving in Australia in 1956. From the start, his art has been abstract, with particular emphasis on technological experimentation. His technique changes as he investigates the use of new media, but his work always reflects his fascination with light, and his love of music and science, especially cosmology.

== Early life ==
Bilu was born in Tel Aviv on 16 December 1936. At the age of fourteen he was sent to Kibbutz Mizra in the Jezreel Valley where he lived and studied until his mandatory army service began in 1954. From the age of eight he studied classical violin. The art teacher at the kibbutz, Rafael Lohat, developed a love of painting in the young musician, and eventually, during his term of army service, the instrument was abandoned and painting became his preferred mode of artistic expression. Early in 1956 he was excited by an exhibition in Tel Aviv of abstract work in the style of Vieira da Silva and was lucky enough to meet and befriend the artist Efraim Modzelevich whose encouragement for his early paintings was pivotal in forming his career. Asher Bilu has not had any other formal art training. However he has continued his musical expression through study of classical Hindustani music on the Indian instrument, the sarod, learning with Pandit Ashok Roy and Dr. Adrian McNeil.

== Art career ==
Bilu arrived in Melbourne, Australia, in December 1956, after completing his Israeli army service. He came to join his parents and sister who had migrated two years earlier. He quickly settled into a studio in St. Kilda Road, completing work for his first solo exhibition at Allan David's Dalgety Street Gallery in 1959. The exhibition was opened by the acclaimed architect Ernest Fooks and was attended by artworld personalities John & Sunday Reed and Georges Mora, the artist Don Laycock and the Brazilian dancer and sculptor Antonio Rodrigues, who all became close friends. This exhibition was followed by two solo exhibitions at John Reed's renowned Museum of Modern Art of Australia and exhibitions in Sydney and Adelaide soon established his reputation. In 1963 Asher Bilu moved to London, where he lived for two years, exhibiting at the Rowan Gallery in London and Kunst Kring in Rotterdam, the Netherlands. Shortly after his return to Melbourne in 1965, he won the prestigious Blake Prize for Religious Art for a work entitled I form Light and Create Darkness – Isiah 45:7 which is dominated by a large meteor shape suggesting a dramatic moment in the birth of life out of chaos. In 1967 Sculptron was exhibited at George Mora's Tolarno Galleries Melbourne. Sculptron was the first electronic sculpture in Australia (Patrick McCaughey, "The Age" 11 July 1967) and was designed with engineering assistance by Tim Berriman. In 1970 he won the First Leasing Prize which was an invitational non-acquisition exhibition mounted at the National Gallery of Victoria, with a first prize of $7,000 the largest prize to date. Second prize winner was Brett Whiteley and third prize winners (shared) Jan Senbergs and Alun Leach-Jones.

== Art materials ==
Early paintings used raw pigments combined with resins sourced from industrial applications and acetone. Textures were achieved by the use of water and fire. 1974 saw the first painting to break the two-dimensional surface (Zone 1) with cut out sections of the painting extending into space. Later dimensional paintings were formed with plywood, then cut out and mounted on wooden blocks, set on a variety of levels. His discovery of a self-supporting paint – a polyvinyl alcohol resin that can be applied on nonporous surfaces, then peeled off when dry – opened up further possibilities. The first major use of this medium was [Amaze (1982)], a walk through painting suspended from the ceiling 42 metres long and 3 metres high and which used 1 ton of paint, exhibited first at United Artists Gallery in Melbourne. Other installations using this medium are [Heavens (2006)] and [In-Visible (2007)]. Found objects and other unconventional materials have also formed the basis of installations and sculpture. [Escape (1992)] utilized 16 tons of paper offcuts from machinery for envelope manufacture, [Explanandum (2002)] utilized industrial wire mesh and [Mysterium (2003)] utilized wooden match splints.

== Installations ==
Bilu transformed Realities Gallery, Melbourne for his exhibition Infinities in 1979, working with lighting designer John Comeadow to install theatre spotlights to light the paintings edge-to-edge, and speakers for music which he had composed and recorded on the Fairlight Synthesiser with the assistance of musician Duncan McGuire. In 1982 Amaze was first exhibited at United Artists Gallery in Melbourne, later touring to Mount Gambier, Sydney and Armidale. Escape (1992) was commissioned by the Melbourne International Festival as an interactive experience for the seven thousand people who visited in ten days. Sanctum (1993) was included in the art component of the Melbourne International Festival. Explanandum (2002), was shown to an invited audience in Melbourne and Adelaide. Mysterium (2003) was commissioned as a non-competitive work for the inaugural sculpture prize at the McClelland Gallery. Heavens (2006) was commissioned by the [Jewish Museum of Australia] and was travelled by [NETS (National Exhibition Touring Support)] to regional galleries in Mornington, Latrobe Valley and Benalla. In-Visible (2007), with lighting designer John Comeadow, was commissioned by Wilson Street Gallery, Sydney. M –Theory(2010), Plexus (2011), Cosmotif (2012) and resurrection (2016) are installations exhibited in the artist’s studio.

== Exhibitions and collections ==
Bilu has had 50 solo exhibitions in Australia, and in London, Rotterdam and Los Angeles. His work has been represented in group exhibitions which include Australian Art Today, touring exhibition to SE Asia (1969), McCaughey Prize, National Gallery of Victoria (1979), I Had a Dream – Australian Art in the 1960s (1997), National Gallery of Victoria, Melbourne, O Soul O Spirit O Fire, Queensland University of Technology Art Museum, Brisbane & touring (2001), After Van Gogh: Australian Artists in homage to Vincent, Mornington Peninsular Regional Gallery (2005), Earthly reflections of heavenly things, 3 person exhibition with Leonard Brown & Emily Kame Kngwarreye, The Ian Potter Museum of Art, Melbourne (2007–08), Volume One: MCA Collection, Museum of Contemporary Art, Sydney (2012). He is represented in the collections of The National Gallery of Australia, National Gallery of Victoria, Art Gallery of NSW, Museum of Contemporary Art, Sydney, Museum of Modern Art at Heide, Melbourne, and many regional galleries and corporations. He was commissioned in 1982 to produce four paintings for the Concert Hall of the Victorian Arts Centre.

== Awards ==
- 1965 C.H. Richards Memorial Prize, Brisbane.
- 1965 Blake Prize, Sydney.
- 1970 First Leasing Prize, Melbourne.
- 1973 Grant, Visual Arts Board, Australia Council

== United Artists Gallery ==
Bilu and Ivan Durrant were the initiators of United Artists Gallery, an artist cooperative situated in the room vacated by Georges Mora's Tolarno Gallery in Fitzroy Street St Kilda. The cooperative flourished from 1982 till 1985, run by a group of mainly mid career artists who wanted to reach the public with innovative work exhibited accessibly. Members included Mike Brown, Joel Elenberg (estate), Dale Hickey, Don Laycock, Peter D. Cole and David Larwill. Asher Bilu painted Amaze to celebrate the spirit of United Artists Gallery which was to provide an art experience that reached viewers across the whole range from the art uneducated to the cognoscenti and to demonstrate that "art" and "the public" were not mutually exclusive.

== Film ==
Bilu has contributed to several films by Director Paul Cox as production designer, Man of Flowers (1983), My First Wife (1983), Cactus (1984), Human Touch (2003) which also features the two installations Explanandum and Amaze and Force of Destiny (2015) in which he created a room using several of his paintings and a sculpture "Time Piece". For the film Vincent: The life and Death of Vincent van Gogh (1987), he designed the scenes to illustrate the paintings of the bedroom and the potato eaters, and painted eleven copies of original Van Gogh paintings to be used for filming.

== Bibliography ==
Examples of Bilu's works are included in the following books on Australian art:

- The Art Collection of the Victorian Arts Centre, Victorian Arts Centre, Melbourne, Australia 1992
- Bonython, Kym, Modern Australian Painting 1970–1975, Rigby Limited, Australia 1976
- Bonython, Kym, Modern Australian Painting 1975–1980, Rigby Limited, Australia 1980
- Crumlin, Rosemary, Images of Religion in Australian Painting, Bay Books, Kensington, NSW, Australia 1988
- Crumlin, Rosemary, The Blake Book/Art, Religion and Spirituality in Australia, MacMillan Art Publishing, Australia 2011
- Drury, Neville (Ed) New Art Five, Craftsman House BVI Ltd, Tortola, BVI 1991
- Drury, Neville, Images in Contemporary Australian Painting, Craftsman House BVI Ltd, Tortola, BVI 1992
- Gleeson, James, Masterpieces of Australian Painting, Landsdowne Press Pty Ltd, 1969 - Maha Yuga, 1967
- Gleeson, James, Modern Painters 1931 1970, Lansdowne Press, Dee Why West, Australia 1971
- Heathcote, Christopher, A Quiet Revolution: The Rise of Australian Art 1946–1968, The Text Publishing Company, Melbourne, Victoria 1995
- Jones, Stephen, Synthetics/Aspects of Art & Technology in Australia 1956–1975, MIT Press, 2011
- Lindsay, Robert (Ed.), The Seventies: Australian Paintings and Tapestries – from the Collection of the National Bank of Australia, National Bank of Australasia, Melbourne, Australia, 1982
- Manton, Neil, Cultural Relations: The Other Side of the Diplomatic Coin, Homosapien Books, 2003
- McCulloch, Alan & Susan, The Encyclopaedia of Australian Art, Allen & Unwin
- Reed, John, New Painting 1952 62, Longmans, Australia 1963
- Smith, Bernard, Australian Painting 1788–2000, Oxford University Press 2001
- Space Place Space Time/Asher Bilu Paintings and Installations, New Street Publishing, Australia 2010
- Reid, Barrett & Underhill, Nancy, Letters of John Reed, Viking 2001
- Thomas, Daniel, Outlines of Australian Art: The Joseph Brown Collection, The MacMillan Company, Australia 1973
- Thomas, Laurie, The Most Noble Art of Them All, University of Queensland Press, St. Lucia, Queensland, Australia 1976
- Wilson, Ashleigh, Brett Whitelely/Art, Life and the Other Thing, Text Publishing, 2016
