= James McGrath (artist) =

Australian artist and architect

James McGrath (born in Sydney, 1969) is a contemporary Australian artist and architect. He is known for his paintings, videos and Plexiglas panels that combine Baroque spatial concepts with seventeenth century sensibility. He uses 3D cloth simulation software to visually fold different religious and mythical genres into one image. Over the last ten years, McGrath has exhibited in New York City, London, Hong Kong, Sydney and Paris.

== Career ==
Son of art critic Sandra McGrath and banker Michael Anthony (Tony) McGrath, after graduating high school, James travelled to Paris to study the techniques and principles of the sixteenth and seventeenth-century masters under the guidance of artist Patrick Betaudier. Upon returning to Australia, McGrath began work as a studio assistant to Arthur Boyd. He went on to earn a Bachelor of Architecture from the University of New South Wales. During this period as an architect, McGrath discovered that Baroque techniques enabled him to connect architecture and art by filling the void space within the CAD (Computer-Aided Design) modelling with narrative. "It occurred to me too, that while you’re on a computer, you are looking through the same perspective window into a 3-D world that Renaissance perspective artists tried to do."

In 2010, he was granted special access to the Strahov Baroque Monastic Library in Prague. Set within this notable historic building, the monastery's libraries hold over 125,000 volumes of philosophical and theological texts which McGrath used as inspiration for his body of work Ex Libris. He was quoted in an article by The Australian Financial Review that his twin daughters motivated him to create the work; "I realised my children were not going to have a library like mine, so I painted them one."

== Awards & Media ==
While a lecturer in design and communications at New South Wales University, McGrath was awarded several prizes for architecture and art, including the 1998 National Digital Art Award, the Sculpture By the Sea Directors Award (video installation), the 1990 Bioloa International Design Award, the Australian Postgraduate Award and Moya Goring Paris Studio residency. He has produced acclaimed digital installations and videos commissioned by several Australian museums and subsequently presented at the J. Paul Getty Museum in 2000. In 1999 and 2000 his work was included in the Sydney and New York film festivals.

Reviews of his exhibitions have appeared in The Australian, Spectrum, The Australian Financial Review, ABC Radio National, Art Review Magazine, London. His work has also been published in Sydney: Metropolis Suburb Harbour by Peter Emmett. In 2012 McGrath released his artistic biography The Folded Gaze and Lacuna in 2013.

== Exhibitions ==
- Olsen Irwin Gallery
- Maitland Regional Art Gallery
- Artereal Gallery
- Sculpture by the Sea
- Carriageworks
- Michael Carr Art Gallery
- Queensland Museum of Modern Art
- Queen Street Fine Art Gallery
- Gibsone Jessop Gallery, Toronto
- The Cat Street Gallery, Hong Kong
- Nevill Keating Gallery, London
- MCG Galleries, New York
- J.Paul Getty Museum, Los Angeles
- Laguna Art Museum in Los Angeles.
