= Annandale Imitation Realists =

Australian art collective

The Annandale Imitation Realists (later known as the Subterranean Imitation Realists, also known as Imitation Realism) was a short-lived collaborative group of Australian mixed media avant-garde artists formed in Sydney in 1961. Founding members were Mike Brown, Ross Crothall, and Colin Lanceley. They staged exhibitions in Sydney's Rudy Komon Gallery and John Reed's Museum of Modern Art and Design in Melbourne. Andrew Sayers, former head of Australia's National Portrait Gallery, described their work as "chaotic, exuberant, and profuse—collaborative collages consisting of junk and plastic objects, doodle-like drawings, and paintings celebrating a bizarre cast of characters." According to Lanceley, Imitation Realism was largely a reaction against what the members perceived as the "conservatism and lack of guts" of the Sydney art world. The group dissolved in 1964.

== History ==
Ross Crothall (1934–), Colin Lanceley (1934–2015), and Mike Brown (1938–1997) met through East Sydney Technical College in 1956, but by 1958 only Lanceley remained at the college, where he later studied painting under renowned Australian abstract artist John Olsen. The three, along with a group of their classmates, had experimented with collaborative art making practices and avant-garde forms of art. Gradually their interests began to diversify into other fields such as assemblage, collage, "junk art", and non-Western art, especially Indigenous Australian art and the body ornaments and tribal house decorations of New Guinea. They collected scraps and debris in the streets of Sydney and in junkyards, infusing their art with a sense of urban larrikinism. By 1960, Crothall and Brown lived together in a house Crothall had rented in Annandale, and Lanceley was a frequent visitor.

They mounted their first exhibition in February 1962 at the Melbourne Museum of Modern Art and Design and their second and final exhibition in May 1962 at the Rudy Komon Gallery in Sydney. Robert Hughes thought their work owes more to "folk art incrustation" than high art and recognized the influence of Sepik art: "In the early 1960s the Sydney art world was saturated in Melanesian art, particularly from the Sepik. One could not be unfamiliar with it." Many had difficulty classifying the works of the Annandale Imitation Realists. According to art historian Christopher Heathcote, "There was confusion over what to call the 'Imitation Realism'. What was this style? Several writers opted for pop art, yet the works resembled neither the European nor American varieties of pop. ... Imitation Realism represented a complete disregard for accepted artistic values." Comparisons were also drawn to Dadaism and the "anti-art" of Marcel Duchamp, primitive art and children's drawings. Mike Brown noted that at different times their work was called "modern reliquary, satirical goonery, and inspired or uninspired doodling,.... It has also been said to comprise a new Art Movement. God forbid."

The group ended in 1964 when Lanceley departed for Europe. He returned to Sydney in 1981, at which stage significant works of the Annandale Imitation Realists were represented in all major galleries in Australia. Lanceley's 1961 work Glad Family Picnic is considered a masterpiece of the movement and is deemed a collection highlight at the Art Gallery of New South Wales.
