= Peter Benjamin Graham =

Australian artist (1925–1987)

Peter Graham
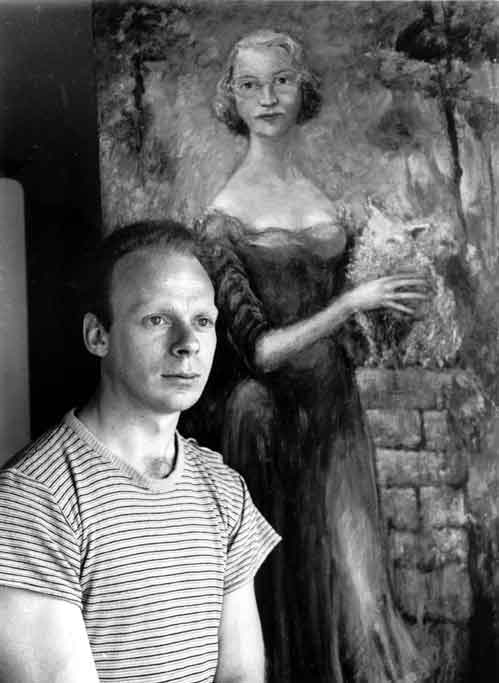
- Peter Graham, Sydney, 1953
- Born: 4 June 1925; Melbourne, Australia
- Died: 15 April 1987 (aged 61); Melbourne, Australia

Peter Benjamin Graham (4 June 1925 – 15 April 1987) was an Australian visual artist, printer, and art theorist.

In 1954, Graham began to explore native Australian wildlife (notably Kangaroos) and themes associated with Aboriginal culture, using the visual languages of European figurative modernism and, later, geometric abstraction.

He began developing a new form of visual geometry related to Chaos Theory from 1960, eventually called Thematic Orchestration. This new visual language enabled the 2D deconstruction and synthesis of an observed subject, in a way fundamentally different from traditional abstraction. Thematic Orchestration allowed the artist to 'grow' an image, producing almost infinite conscious invention.

In 1964, Graham began developing what he called a high-level visual notation system for pure visual imagery, which he first named "Notation Painting" and later "New Epoch Art".

Graham was a pioneer of the Australian artist-run initiative movement and ran The Queensberry Street Gallery in association with Victorian Printmakers' Group from 1973 until 1978.

In 2006, Graham's 1945 painting Peter Lalor Addressing the Miners Before Eureka was featured in a major Australian travelling exhibition celebrating the 150th anniversary of the Eureka Stockade. This painting is also featured in Riot or Revolution, a dramatized history documentary on the Eureka Stockade directed by Don Parham and produced by Parham Media Productions in association with the Australian Broadcasting Corporation in 2005.

== Early years ==
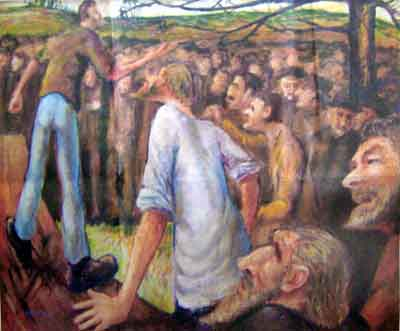
Peter Lalor Addressing the Miners Before Eureka by Peter Graham, Oil On Canvas 1945

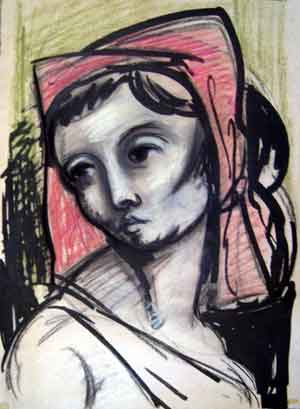
Head Of A Woman by Peter Graham, 1949, Ink and pastel on paper 52 × 38.5 cm

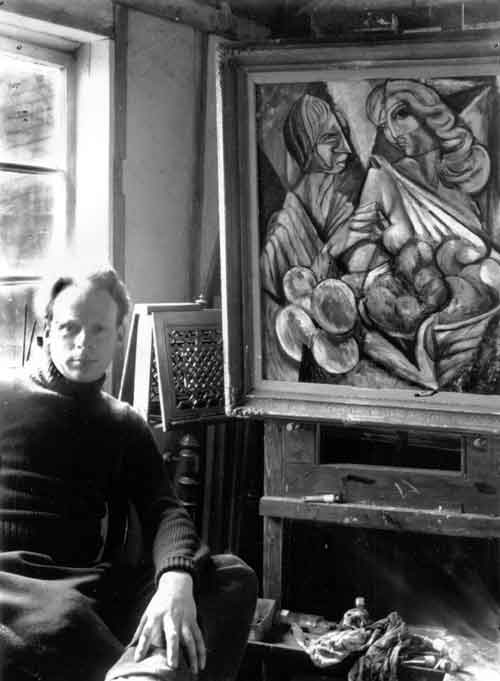
Graham at The Abby Arts Centre, England, 1947 with his painting Old Age And Youth

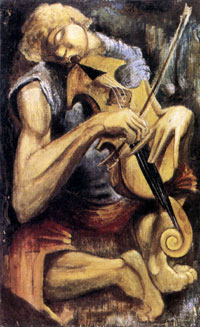
The Blind Fiddler by Peter Graham, 1947, Oil On Canvas 81 × 51 cm

Peter Graham was born 4 June 4, 1925 and raised in the Melbourne suburb of Hartwell. He was awarded a scholarship to Melbourne Technical College Art School for one year in 1939. He studied Hand Lithography with Ross McClintock Studios (Colour separation from artists' originals, drawn as lithographic plates – 24 sheet positives, etc.) between 1940 and 1941. Graham transferred his indenture to PhotoGravures Pty Ltd. in 1941. There, he was trained by master craftsmen in facsimile reproduction and pre-press Rotogravure techniques during the war years. He received his Certificate of Completion of Apprenticeship in 1946.

Between 1941 and 1946, Graham studied fine art with Victor Greenhalgh and John Rowell in night classes at Melbourne Technical College – figure and portraiture.

In 1945, Graham joined the Victorian Artists Society and exhibited his first painting in the Australia at War Exhibition at the National Gallery of Victoria. At the same time, he began his association with the Melbourne Social Realism group, which included: Noel Counihan, Josl Berger, Victor O'Connor, Ma Mahood, Herbert McClintock, Rembrandt McClintock, Frank Andrew, and Nutta Buzzacott. He exhibited regularly at the Victorian Artists Society until 1947.

In 1946, he was awarded the Ferntree Gully Art Prize for best watercolour, 'Back Streets of Hawthorn'; a year later, he was awarded the Herald prize for best drawing, 'The Smokers'. He left for England with Grahame King in August 1947.

== England ==
Between 1947 and 1949, Graham lived and painted at The Abbey Arts Centre in New Barnet, London, along with artists Leonard French, James Gleeson, Douglas Allan Green, Stacha Halpern, Grahame King, Inge King and Robert Klippel. During this time, he also befriended the Irish 'folk' artist Gerald Dillon who lived nearby and who introduced Graham to the visual languages of Picasso and Matisse. He exhibited in group shows at William Ohly's Berkeley Galleries, and the Contemporary Artists' Society in London.

In 1948, Graham studied drawing under Bernard Meninsky at Central School of Art, London. But with his money running short, he decided to go back to work at Odhams Press. He specialized in the inverted half-tone Dultgen process and masked colour separation until 1950.

In 1950, Graham traveled through France and Italy before returning to Sydney under a three-year contract to Australian Consolidated Press working as a specialist in colour separation.

== Sydney ==
Between 1951 and 1953, Graham exhibited paintings in various group shows in Sydney, including the Inaugural Blake Prize for Religious Art.

== Alice Springs ==
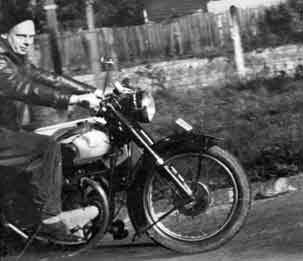
Graham tested his BSA 500 motorcycle in Melbourne, just before heading off to Alice Springs.

In 1954, Graham rode a BSA 500 motorcycle non-stop from Sydney to Melbourne. After rebuilding the bike, he headed across to Adelaide then rode solo up along the route of what is now the Stuart Highway to Alice Springs over five days. There he worked as a builder's laborer for 18 months while painting on the side, until the end of 1955. During this time he worked and painted alongside Aboriginal artists, Adolf Inkamala and the Pareroultja Brothers. He helped build the John Flynn Memorial Church and government housing at Hermannsburg Mission. At Hermannsburg, Graham met anthropologist Ted Strehlow, who transformed his way of seeing the Australian landscape and Aboriginal culture.

== Fiji ==
Graham spent six months in Fiji painting and drawing in 1956.

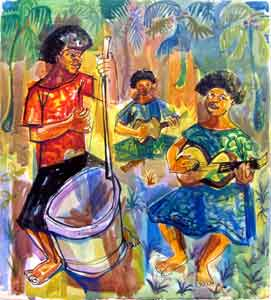
Fijian String Band by Peter Graham 1956 W/C and ink on paper 43 x 39 cm

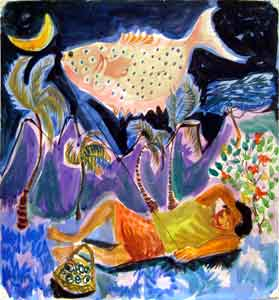
Dream Of The Big Fish by Peter Graham 1956 W/C, ink and pencil on paper 42 x 39 cm

== Gallery A (Melbourne) ==
1956–1960: Graham returned to Melbourne, rejoined PhotoGravures Pty Ltd. Shared a studio with Leonard French and befriended the New Zealand born artist George Johnson, who introduced Graham to the work of Kandinsky, Klee and Mondrian. Painted a series of abstract works based on his Central Australian experience. These were exhibited at Gallery A (Melbourne) in 1960, founded in the same year by Max Hutchinson and Clement Meadmore.

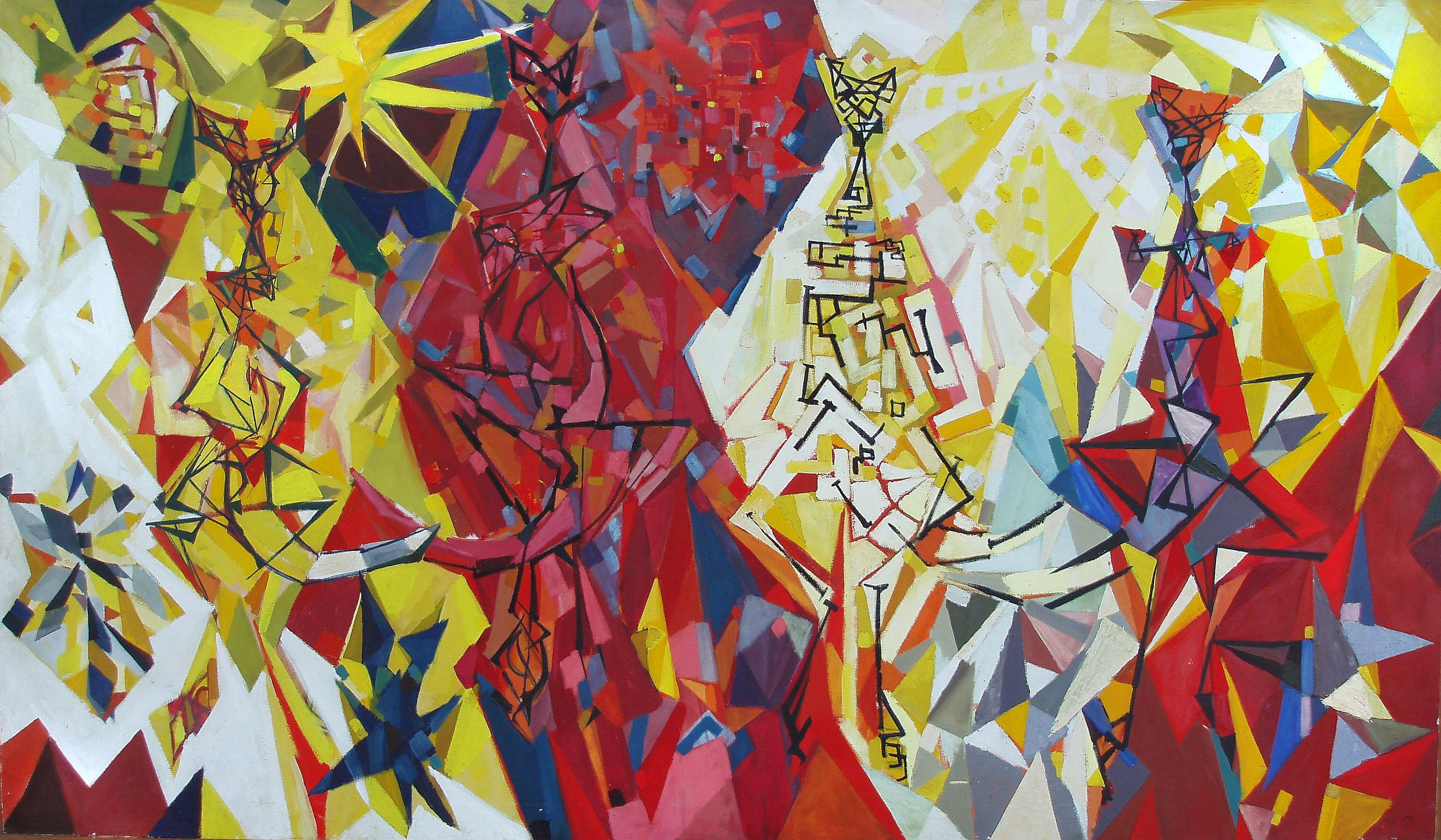
Kangaroo Paddock by Peter Benjamin Graham 1957, Hand Ground Oil on Canvas, 1420mm × 2455mm.jpg

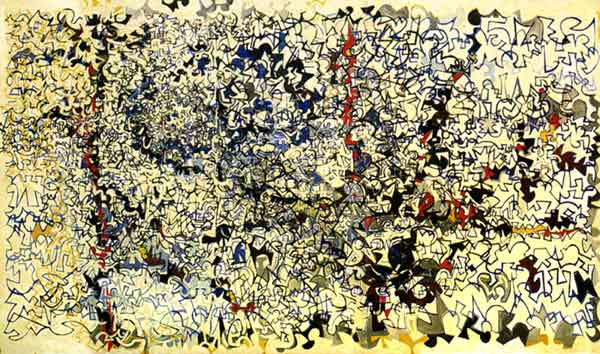
The Waters Of Lethe by Peter Benjamin Graham 1964 Oil on canvas, 1680mm × 2890mm

== Linear extension ==
- 1961–1964 – Graham completed a new series of paintings referred to as Linear Extensions.
- 1964–1973 – Graham conducted experimental studies based on a new concept of Notation Painting.
- 1965 – Graham established his own photo-lithographic business, Photocraft Services.
- In 1967 the Reverend Alfred M Dickie married Graham and Cynthia Louis who went on to raise a family of three children: Philip, Michaela, and Euan Graham.

== Peter Graham Gallery – Queensberry Street Gallery (Melbourne) ==
From 1971 to 1978, Graham created a series of experimental works using photographic and lithographic techniques and materials.

In 1971, Graham befriended artist Paul Cavell and collaborated with him on his Notation Paintings between 1974 and 1976.

In 1973, he opened the Peter Graham Gallery at 225 Queensberry Street, Carlton (6 April) supported by a photo-lithographic workshop in the same premises. Closed this gallery in 1974 and reopened it as the Queensberry Street Gallery in 1977.

Graham's Solo Exhibitions at the Queensberry Street Gallery:

- 1973 Notation Drawings and Paintings from 1961 to 1973
- Australian Watercolours from 1954, 1955 and 1973
- 1974 Western Port Foreshores
- 1977 Western Port Places – Notation Painting
- 1978 Survey from 1947 to 1978

During 1977, Graham collaborated with Noela Hjorth and the Victorian Printmakers' Group which at the time was lobbying for space in the Victorian Government's proposed Meatmarket Craft space. He was appointed to the Interim Committee in the formation stages of the Meatmarket Craft Centre and helped to draw up a plan for the establishment of an access workshop for Printmakers at the Meatmarket. As part of his involvement, he set up a plate-graining service for artists and student Printmakers and became the manager of this facility.

Victorian Printmakers' Workshop group show opened at The Queensberry Street Gallery by Professor Bernard Smith 26 July 1977.

Graham closed his gallery in 1978 and transferred his workshop to a home studio in Canterbury (Melbourne) at the end of the year.

== Final years ==
- 1979–1984 – Graham experimented with esoteric printing techniques including collotype, and a new form of screenless lithography using a pre-sensitized continuous tone aluminium plate.
- 1981–1983 – Graham worked on series of drawings called Paradise Destroyed, and contributing to several anti-nuclear exhibitions.
- 1983 – Graham returned to his Central Australian subject matter with large series of watercolours and oils entitled The Painted Land. Completed at this time a memoir of his stay in Alice Springs, called 'Journal of a Small Journey'. (Taped version in Archives at National Library of Australia, collected by Barbara Blackman
- 1984–1985 – Graham painted Tragic Landscape series.

Graham returned to development of Notation Painting in 1986 in collaboration with his son, Philip Mitchell Graham. Arranged with Jan Martin for a retrospective exhibition to be held at her gallery in Lyttleton Street, Castlemaine, Victoria.

Graham was admitted to the Hospital where he was diagnosed with Cancer of the oesophagus December 1986.

Graham died on 15 April 1987 at Heidelberg Repatriation Hospital, Melbourne.

A memorial exhibition for Graham opened at the Lyttleton Gallery, Castlemaine in central Victoria on 6 June 1987, two days after what would have been his 62nd birthday.

== Awards won ==
- Ferntree Gully Art Prize for best watercolour: Back Streets of Hawthorn 1946
- The Herald prize for best drawing: The Smokers 1947

== Publications ==
- Graham, Peter, 'Artist's and Reality' Arena No 11 (1966), Arena publishing, Greensborough, Victoria, Australia ISSN 0004-0932
- Graham, Peter, et al., 'PEACE', Callenders published by Congress for International Co-operation and Disarmament (1980, 1981, 1982)
- Graham, Peter, Notation Illustrations for The Westernport Bay Symposium, Royal Society of Victoria Proceedings, Melbourne, Stillwell and Co. Vol 87, P1, 21 August 1975, ISSN 0035-9211

== Collections ==
- Castlemaine Art Museum

== Sources ==
- Bell, George, Review of Australia At War Exhibition, The Sun, September 1945
- McCulloch, Alan, Review of Ferntree Gully Exhibition, The Herald, 5 November 1945
- Turnbull, Clive, Preview of the Autumn Exhibition of the Victorian Artists Society, The Herald, April 1946
- Bell, George, Preview of the Autumn Exhibition of the Victorian Artists Society, The Sun, 27 April 1946
- Turnbull, Clive, Preview of the Spring Exhibition of the Victorian Artists Society, The Herald, 27? October 1946
- Bell, George, Review of the Ferntree Gully Art Exhibition, The Sun, 9 December 1946
- McDonald, Review of the Ferntree Gully Art Exhibition, The Age, 9 December 1946, Melbourne, Victoria, Australia, ISSN 0312-6307
- Bell, George, Review of the Autumn Exhibition of the Victorian Artists Society, The Sun 29 April 1947
- Turnbull, Clive, Preview of the exhibition of drawings at the Victorian Artists Society, The Herald, 18 July 1947
- Shore, Arnold, Diversity of Work and Painters, The Argus, June 1960
- McCulloch, Alan, Trend towards abstract, Melbourne The Herald, 8 June 1960
- Boles, Bernard, Review of Peter's Notation drawings exhibition, The Nation Review, April 1973
- McCulloch, Alan, Dynamism in our seascapes, The Herald, p37, 16 May 1973
- McCulloch, Alan, An Object Lesson In Magnificence, The Herald, 12 December 1973
- McCulloch, Alan, Review of Peter Graham's exhibition Western Port Foreshores, The Herald, 2 October 1974
- George, Chris, Art Gets Into Print, The Sun, 28 July 1977
- Germaine, Max, Artists and Galleries of Australia and New Zealand, 1979 ISBN 978-976-8097-02-6
- Lahey, John, Quiet artists life revealed on 2500 canvasses creates a stir, The Age, 7 July 1987, Melbourne, Victoria, Australia, ISSN 0312-6307
- Stone, Deborah, Beyond the Grave – A Painting Performed, The Australian, 22 April 1988, R. Murdoch, Australian Capital Territory, Canberra, Australia, ISSN 1038-8761
- Prendergast, Maria Ed. The 1989 Australian Arts Diary, (1988) ISSN 0729-3127
- Litchman, Loy Dr. New Epoch Painting: The ideas of Peter Graham, InterACTA: Journal of the Art Teachers Association of Victoria, Published by ACTA, Parkville, Victoria, No 4, 1988, ISSN 0159-9135, Cited In APAIS. This database is available on the, Informit Online Internet Service or on CD-ROM, or on Australian Public Affairs – Full Text
- Coster, Peter, Domestic treasures open up a masterly storehouse, The Australian, 2 October 1990
- Graham, Philip Mitchell, New Epoch Art, InterACTA: Journal of the Art Teachers Association of Victoria, Published by ACTA, Parkville, Victoria, No 4, 1990, ISSN 0159-9135, Cited In APAIS. This database is available on the, Informit Online Internet Service on CD-ROM, or on Australian Public Affairs – Full Text
- Lancashire, Rebecca, The art of painting in numbers, The Age, 25 May 1991, Melbourne, Victoria, Australia, ISSN 0312-6307
- McCulloch, Alan, Encyclopedia of Australian Art, ISBN 978-1-871569-73-5
- Smith, Bernard, Noel Counihan Artist and Revolutionary Oxford University Press Australia 1993 ISBN 0-19-553587-1
- Heathcote, Christopher Dr. Harking back to Romantic spirit, The Age, 6 August 1993, Melbourne, Victoria, Australia, ISSN 0312-6307
- Mc Culloch, Alan and Mc Culloch, Susan, The Encyclopedia of Australian Art, online version by Google books. p 304, 1994
- Heathcote, Christopher Dr. A Quite Revolution: the rise of Australian Art 1946 - 1968 Melbourne: The Text Publishing Company, 1995, pp 8, 96, 125, 134, 160, 259, 263 ISBN 1-875847-10-3
- Grishin, Sasha. et al. "The art of Grahame King" Macmillan Art Publishing, South Yarra, Victoria, Australia, 2005 pp 20, 23, 95, ISBN 1-876832-59-2 ISBN 978-1-876832-59-9
- Film: Riot or Revolution. A dramatised documentary directed by Don Parham and produced by Parham Media Productions in association with the Australian Broadcasting Corporation 2005
- Molony, John, Dawn Of A Democracy The Age, 27 November 2006, Melbourne, Victoria, Australia, ISSN 0312-6307

== Primary source material publicly available ==
In 1989 Cynthia Graham was interviewed about her husband, Peter Graham.

There are currently two tape recordings by Peter Graham available at the National Library of Australia, Petherick Oral History Reading Room:

- Interview with Peter Graham by Paul Davis et al., 5 June 1977 Concentrates on his early years in England and gives some information on his notation research
- Peter Graham reciting his memoir, Journal of a Small Journey. Recording by Philip Mitchell Graham, 10 April 1982. This memoir details his motorbike trip to Alice Springs in 1954 and his subsequent experiences in Central Australia over the following 18 months.
