= Melinda Rackham =

Australian artist and writer

- Education: College of Fine Arts

Melinda Rackham is an Australian writer, artist and curator. She is currently an adjunct research professor at the University of South Australia.

== Education and early art ==
Rackham studied sculpture and performance at the College of Fine Arts in Sydney, graduating in 1989 with the Sculpture and Alumni prizes. It was here she was first involved in Australian artist-run initiatives, initially as Co-Director in 1987 (with Adrienne Doig) of ArtHaus laneway gallery in Darlinghurst, New South Wales, then as a member of Ultimo Project Studio Collective in Ultimo and Glebe in Sydney.

In 1995, while completing a Master of Arts in Women's Studies at the University of Wollongong, Rackham became one of the earliest Australian curators of internet art. In collaboration with Louise Manner, Ali Smith and Sandy O’Sullivan, Rackham produced the 1995 exhibition WWWO: Wollongong Worlds Women Online – an Australian online women's group exhibition, featuring the first or early digital works from 30 Australian women including Francis Dyson and Mez Breeze.

In 2000, Rackham's carrier won The Mayne Award for Multimedia, part of the Adelaide Festival Awards for Literature. In an interview with Eugene Thacker in CTheory, Rackham speaks of dealing with the body at a molecular level "infectious agents... steaming open protoplasmic envelopes, penetrating cellular cores, crossing species boundaries, and shattering illusions of the discrete autonomy of ourselves" In a paper analysing carrier for the academic journal Biography, scholar Tully Barnett connects the carrier to posthumanist theories, and describes it as "a biopolitical web-based work that sets out to destabilize users' traditional or conventional notions of the body." The work is "a text- and image-based multimedia work that invites the reader to navigate through a narrative of infection and illness." Darren Tofts describes carrier as "a work that interprets the body as a navigable zone or space of ethereal strangeness."

Rackham's artworks were widely exhibited during the first wave of internet art (1995–2003) being included in seminal exhibitions like Art Entertainment Network, Beyond Interface, ISEA, European Media Art Festival, transmediale, Perspecta99, Biennale de Montreal 2000, and Biennial of Buenos Aires 2002.

She is founder and producer the online media arts forum, –empyre–, from 2002 as part of her doctoral thesis on Art and Identity in Virtual Reality Environments. -empyre- featured in events at NTT InterCommunication Center Tokyo, and documenta in the Documenta 12 magazines project (2006).

Building Empyrean – one of Australia's first multi-user virtual reality environments, Rackham explored the conception of electronically mediated environments as "soft skinned space", and encouraged users' to explore their relationship with their avatars.

Two of Rackham's internet artworks are included in N. Katherine Hayle's Electronic Literature: New Horizons for the Literary – a book designed to help electronic literature move into the classroom along with the CD "The Electronic Literature Collection, Volume 1".

== Work ==
In April 2003, Rackham was invited to be the inaugural Curator of Networked Media at the Australian Centre for the Moving Image (ACMI) in Melbourne In 2004 she led the networked component of the landmark 2004: Australian Culture Now exhibition held conjointly between ACMI and the National Gallery of Victoria From 2010 to 2012 was co-curator for Australia's Royal Institution.

She was Director of the Australian Network for Art and Technology from 2005 until 2009. She fostered the development of wearable technologies – producing the re:Skin Masterclass, and curating Coded Cloth exhibition of wearable technology at Samstag Museum in 2008.

As an adjunct professor at RMIT University, from 2009 to 2012, Rackham continued to curate and write on the emerging art and cultures manifesting across networked, responsive, biological, wearable and distributed practices and environments. In 2010 she curated "Dream Worlds: Australian Moving Image", platforming artists on the 27 meter long public screen in Beijing's exclusive Sanlitun Village and large screens in Xian, and examined the cultural impact of media arts in China and Hong Kong.

After researching and writing the monograph Catherine Truman: Touching Distance published in 2016, she took a sabbatical and lived part-time over a period of two years on the Anangu Pitjantjatjara Yankunytjatjara (APY) lands.

Rackham was appointed Adjunct Research Professor at UniSA Creative, University of South Australia, where, since 2017, she researches and publishes on the arts, environment and feminism. In 2019 she completed a suite of essays for Cyberfeminist sheroes VNS Matrix which are published on their Web Archive.

CoUNTess: Spoiling Illusions since 2008, co-authored with Elvis Richardson, which documents the origins and evolution of the CoUNTess project; exposes gender asymmetry in the Australian artworld with statistical data; and proposes interventions for a sustainable future, was published in June 2023.

== Adoption ==
Rackham was an active member of the adoptee advocacy group IDentityRites from 2014 to 2017. She served on the Steering Committee, which commissioned "The Space Between", a commemorative public artwork in recognition of the long lasting effects of forced adoption practices in South Australia, located in Grundy Gardens along Adelaide's River Torrens, unveiled on 14 July 2016.

With IDentityRites, Rackham co-authored and co-produced a volume of poetry and prose, "ADOPTED", in 2017, and in 2018 she featured in Heather Waters' documentary film on the lifelong effects of adoption, titled You Should be Grateful.

== Awards ==
- 2018 SALA Festival Patron's Art Writer's Award, Australia
- 2001 SoundSpace Award for Virtual Environments, Stuttgarter Filmwinter, Germany
- 2000 The Mayne Award for Multimedia as part of the Adelaide Festival Awards for Literature
- 1999 Gram Internet Art Prize, Argentina

== Publications ==
- 2023 CoUNTess: Spoiling Illusions Since 2008, with Elvis Richardson, Countess.Report, Melbourne
- 2019 "Essays: VNS Matrix" "Manifesto", "Game Girl", "A Tender Hex", "@go #91010",
- 2017 "ADOPTED",
- 2016 Catherine Truman: Touching Distance,
