= Runway Australian Experimental Art =

Australian experimental art journal

- Front cover of the 15th issue of Runway featuring the work "I TRUSTED YOU" by Australian artist Agatha Gothe-Snape.
- Editorial Board: Ally Bisshop; Miriam Kelly; David Greenhalgh; Sophie Harrington; Siân McIntyre; Laura McLean
- Categories: Artistic research
- Frequency: Triannual
- Format: Online
- Publisher: Invisible Inc.
- First issue: 2002; 23 years ago
- Country: Australia
- Based in: Sydney, AU
- Language: English
- Website: runway.org.au
- ISSN: 1448-8000 (print); 2203-5869 (web)
- OCLC: 223534699

Runway Australian Experimental Art is an independent Australian experimental art journal run by a collective of Sydney-based and internationally based artists, writers and Curators.

The first issue of the journal was published in 2002 by the Australian artist-run initiative Invisible Inc. Runway was published exclusively in print until it was relaunched at the end of 2013 as an ejournal. In 2015, The Art Life described the editorial board at the time as troublemakers "crowding at the edges" of its annual list of the 50 most powerful people in Australian art.
