= Woodburytype =

Photomechanical printing process

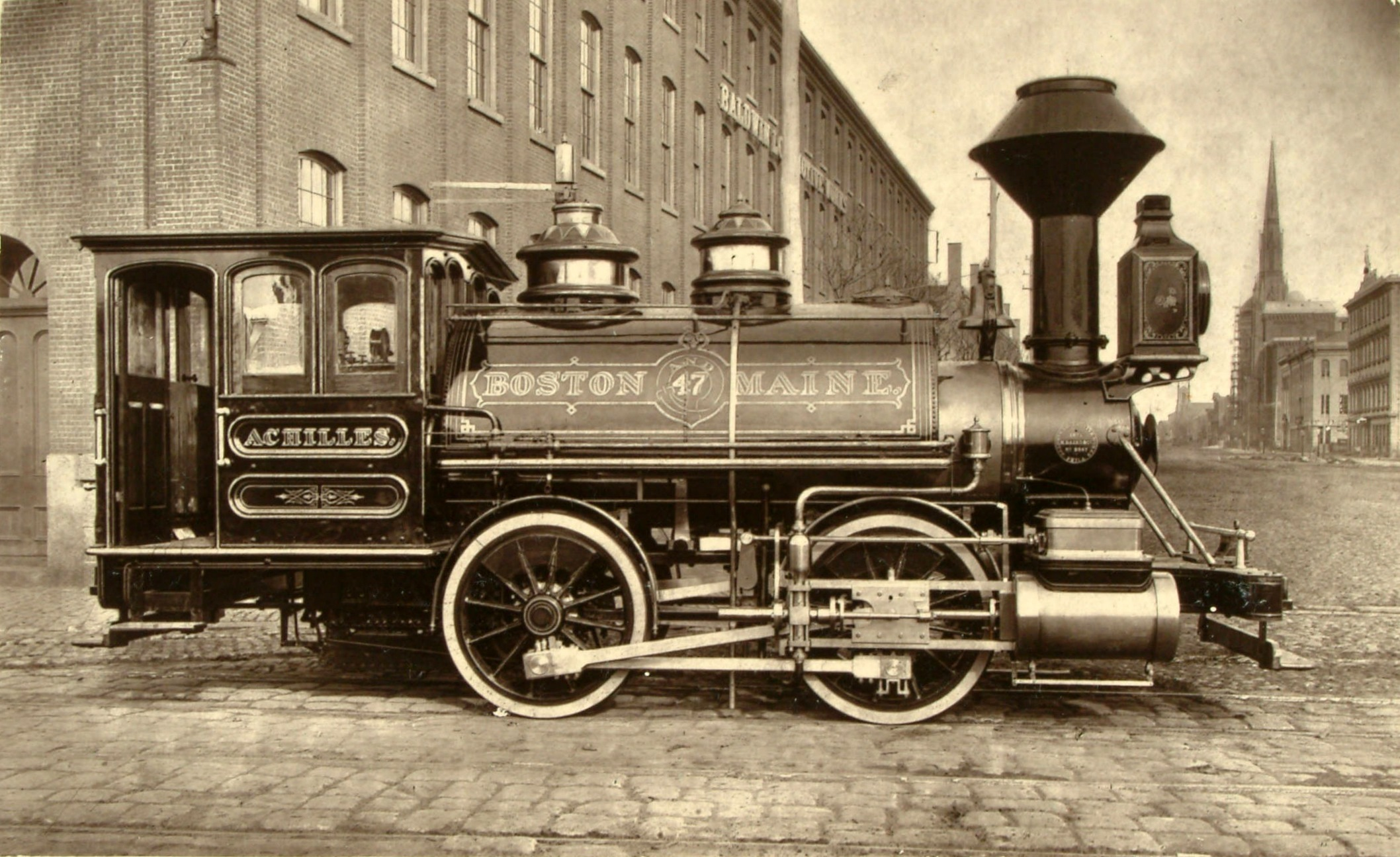
Boston & Maine locomotive at the Baldwin Locomotive Works by John Carbutt, 1871

A Woodburytype is both a printing process and the print that it produces. In technical terms, the process is a photomechanical rather than a photographic one, because sensitivity to light plays no role in the actual printing. The process produces very high quality continuous tone images in monochrome, with surfaces that show a slight relief effect. Essentially, a Woodburytype is a mold-produced copy of an original photographic negative with a tonal range similar to a carbon print.

The process was introduced by the English photographer Walter B. Woodbury and was in use during the final third of the 19th century, most commonly for illustrating fine books with photographic portraits. It was ultimately displaced by halftone processes that produced prints of lower quality but were much cheaper.

== Process ==
A dichromate-sensitized sheet of gelatin is exposed to UV-rich light through a photographic negative, causing each area of the gelatin to harden to a depth proportional to the amount of exposure. It is then soaked in warm water to dissolve the unhardened portion of the gelatin. The resulting relief image is pressed into a thick sheet of lead under about 5000 pounds per square inch of pressure. This creates an intaglio metal printing plate, which is used as a mold. It is filled with liquid pigmented gelatin and a sheet of paper is then pressed down onto it, squeezing out the excess gelatin and attaching the remainder to the paper. After the gelatin has set sufficiently, the print is stripped from the mold, trimmed, and usually mounted onto a larger sheet or card.

== History ==
The Woodburytype process was invented by Walter B. Woodbury and patented in 1864. It was the first successful photomechanical process fully able to reproduce the delicate continuous tone of photographs. It produced true middle values and did not make use of a screen or other image deconstruction method. It was often considered the most perfect, most beautiful photomechanical process and inspired a number of books, magazines, and special edition printings between 1864 and 1910. When attempts were made to adopt Woodburytype to rotary printing, the process could not compete with the quickly developing collotype and halftone photomechanical processes that almost completely replaced Woodburytype by the end of the nineteenth century.

Like many practical inventions, the Woodburytype process was built on, or had features in common with, other inventions and discoveries. It utilized the photosensitivity of dichromated gelatin, discovered in 1852 by Henry Fox Talbot, who was thereby building on Mungo Ponton's 1839 contribution of potassium dichromate to the list of known sensitizing agents for making photographs on paper. The photochemical formation of the gelatin relief dates back to the first carbon printing patent of Alphonse Poitevin (1855). The idea of washing unhardened gelatin from the lower part of an exposed gelatin layer can be found in the early experiments of Adolphe Fargier (1861) and in the development of Joseph Swan’s fully practical carbon-transfer process (1864). Alois Auer, in his 1853 book on nature printing, describes making printing plates by forcibly impressing soft low-relief objects, such as leaves, into sheets of lead. The ancient Egyptians made molds and used them to mass-produce small ceramic goods.

It is therefore not overly remarkable that some or all of the credit for the invention of “photorelief printing” was claimed by, or on behalf of, more than one inventor when the Woodburytype process was current, or that the matter can still generate heated debate among those inventors' present-day admirers.

Regardless of the fact that many historical findings support Joseph Swan’s priority of original ideas for the photorelief process introduced under the name photo-mezzotint, it was Woodbury who advanced his research ideas into a fully workable and practical method of photomechanical printing of continuous-tone photographs. Woodbury’s patents in England, France, Belgium, and the United States, as well as production of several Woodburytype process printing establishments in England, France, and the US, were responsible for the printing of hundreds of thousands of Woodburytype photographs that provided book and magazine illustrations, short-run advertisement material, and promotional material. A number of Woodburytype images were also printed for sale as individual images or as cartes-de-visite (CDV) or cabinet cards (CC).

Woodbury himself and a number of other researchers continued to improve various practical aspects of the Woodburytype process. Several important variants of the Woodburytype process were also developed and used on a very limited scale.

The Woodburytype process was a unique photomechanical process as it was the only practical fully continuous-tone photomechanical process ever invented. Woodburytype prints made using only carbon black or other stable inorganic pigments as imaging material are superbly stable from light fading. The stability of the gelatin binder might be compromised at higher temperatures and humidity due to biological deterioration. A number of Woodburytype prints were surface coated using collodion or other organic varnishes and coatings.

The majority of Woodburytype prints are easy to identify because the process was clearly described in print in books and on many prints sold commercially. Those that are described as “permanent prints” or not described at all, however, can be difficult to identify correctly even when using highly sophisticated analytical methods.

English: Woodburytype, photorelief printing, Woodbury’s process, relievo printing French: photoglyptie German: Woodburydruck

== Gallery ==
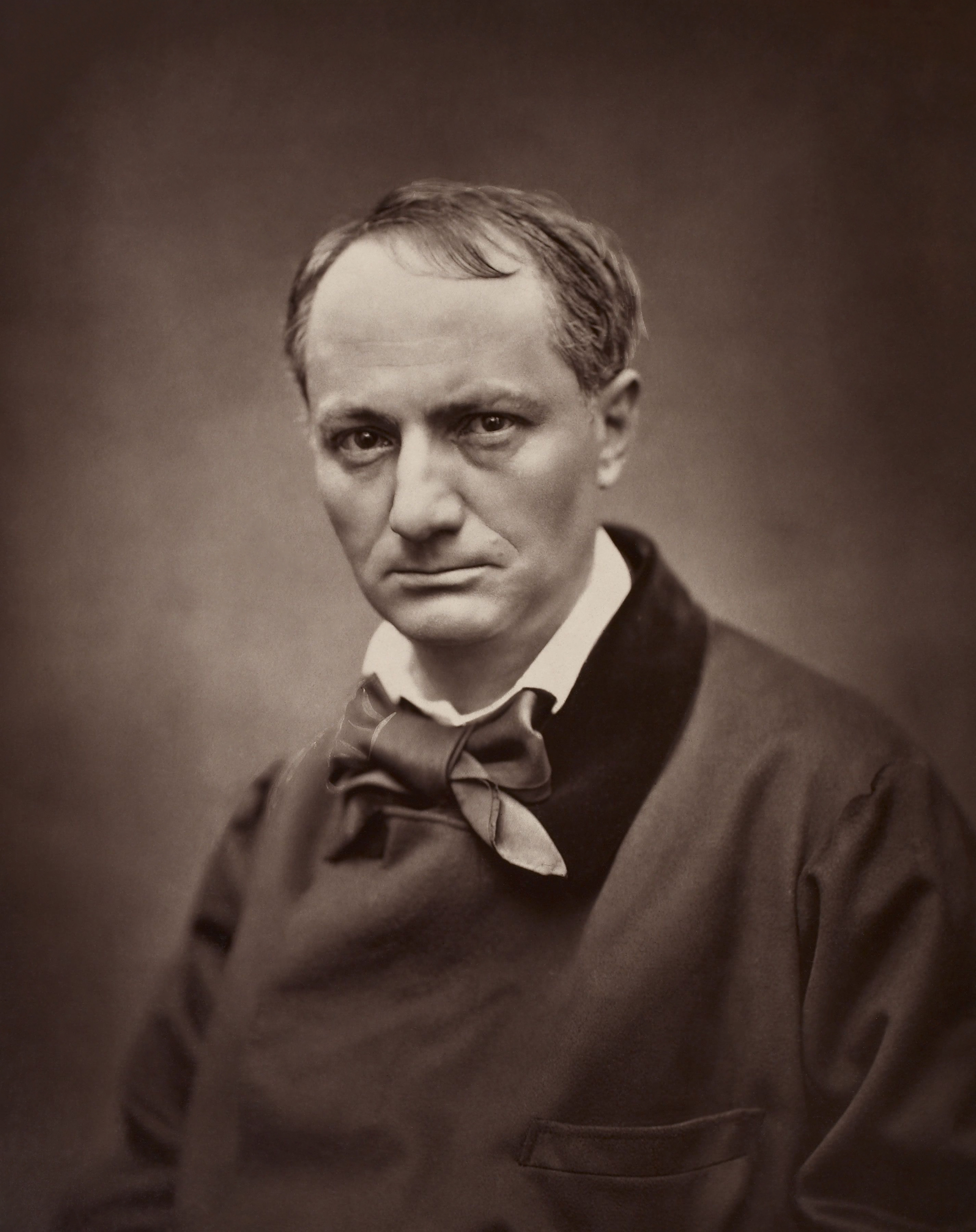
Charles Baudelaire by Étienne Carjat, c. 1862

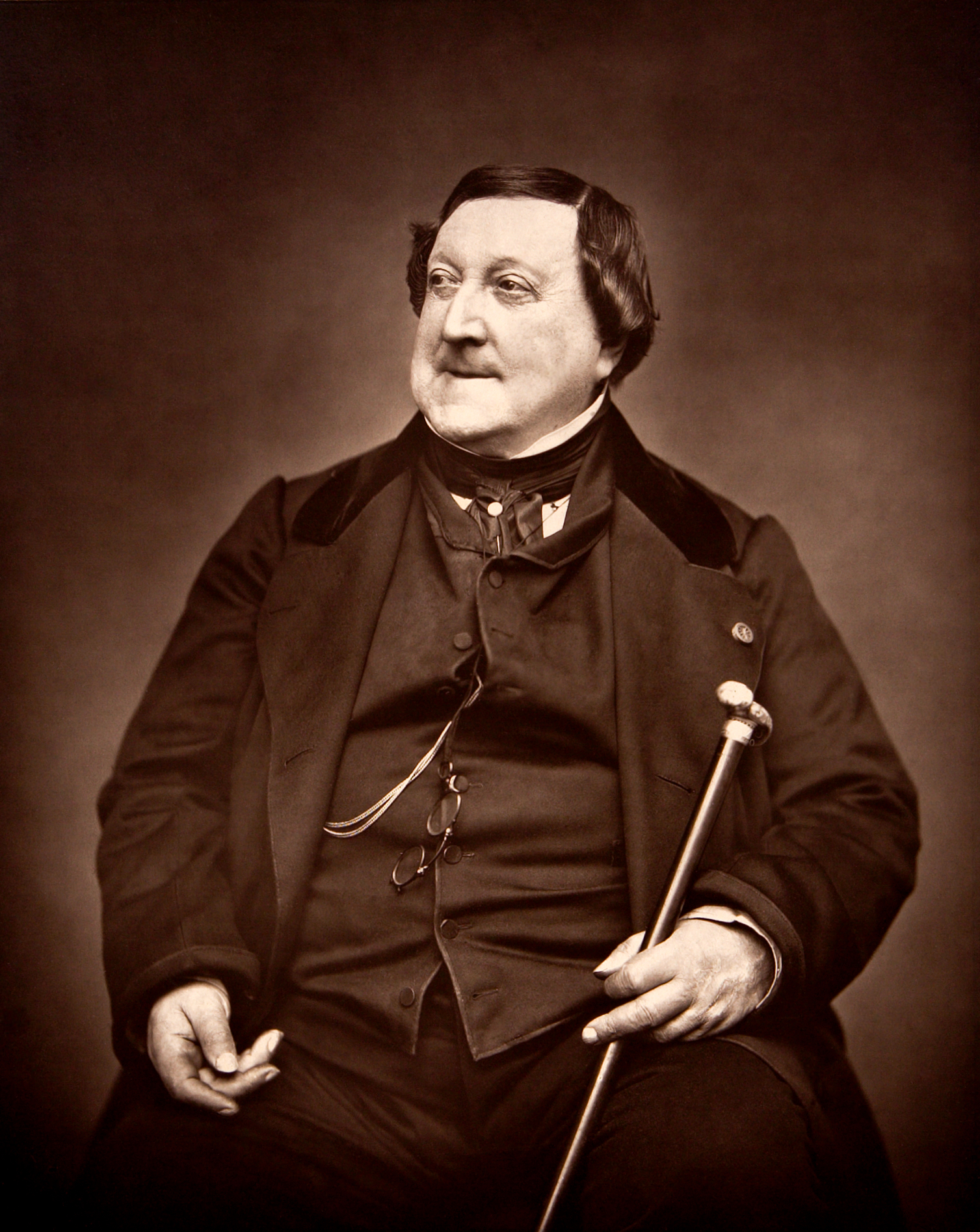
Gioacchino Rossini by Carjat, 1865

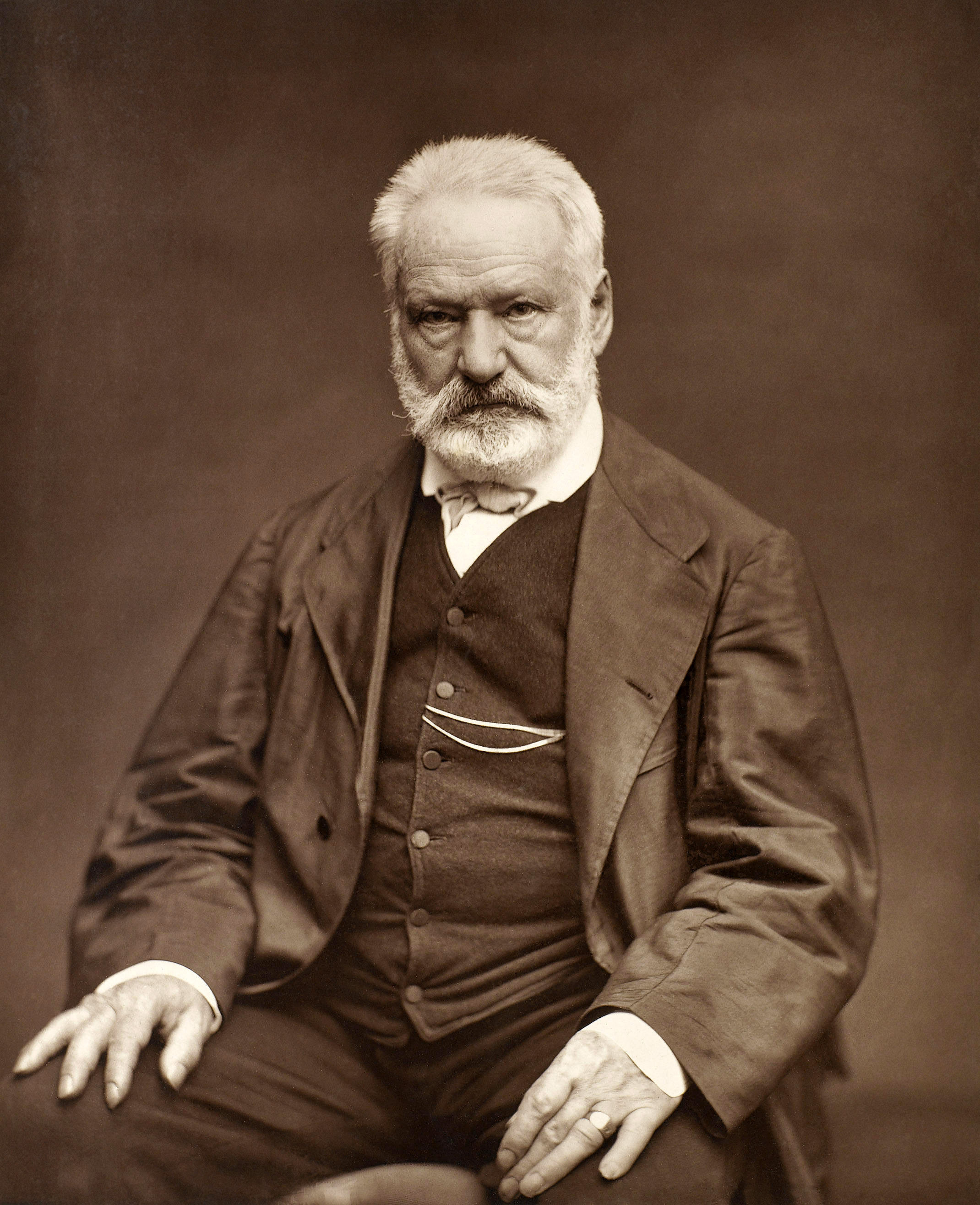
Victor Hugo by Carjat, 1876

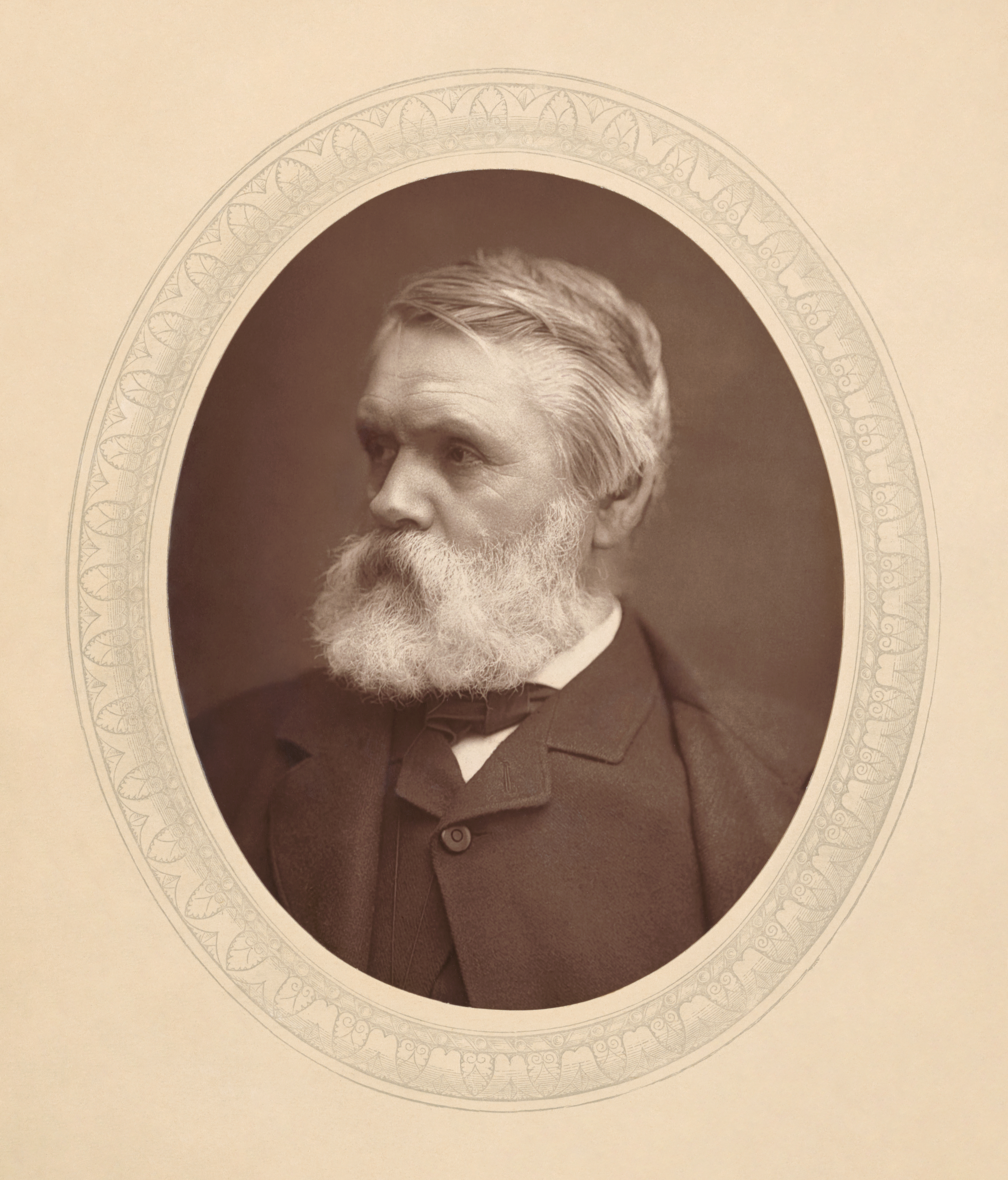
Tom Taylor by Lock and Whitfield, c. 1880

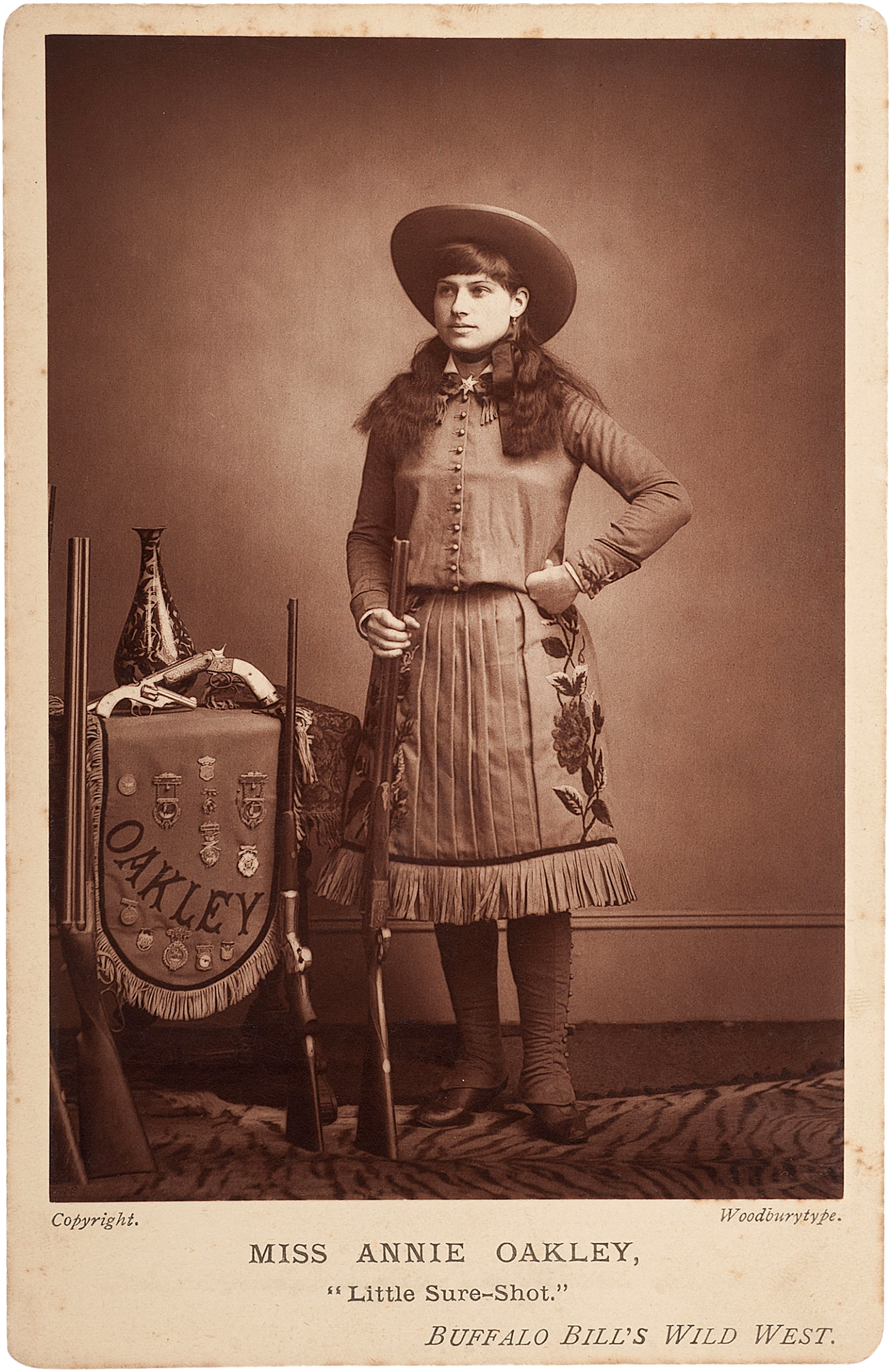
Annie Oakley by Elliott & Fry, c. 1890s

== See also ==
- Carbon print

== Sources ==
- Art & Architecture Thesaurus, s.v. "Woodburytype (process)". Accessed 28 September 2006.
- Auer, Michèle, and Michel Auer. Encyclopédie internationale des photographes de 1839 à nos jours/Photographers Encyclopaedia International 1839 to the Present (Hermance: Editions Camera Obscura, 1985).
- Bloom, John. "Woodbury and Page: Photographers of the Old Order". In Toward Independence: A Century of Indonesia Photographed (San Francisco: The Friends of Photography, 1991), 29-30.
- Oliver, Barret. A History of the Woodburytype: The First Successful Photomechanical Printing Process and Walter Bentley Woodbury (Nevada City, Ca, Carl Mautz Publishing, 2007).
- Ovenden, Richard. John Thomson (1837-1921): Photographer (Edinburgh: National Library of Scotland, The Stationery Office, 1997), 35-36, 216.
- Rosenblum, Naomi. A World History of Photography (New York: Abbeville Press, 1984), 34, 197-198.
- Union List of Artist Names, s.v. "Woodbury, Walter Bentley". Accessed 28 September 2006.
- Stulik, Dusan C. and Kaplan, Art. Woodburytype (The Atlas of Analytical Signatures of Photographic Processes) (Los Angeles: The Getty Conservation Institute, 2013).
