= Louis Arthur Ducos du Hauron =

French pioneer of colour photography (1837–1920)

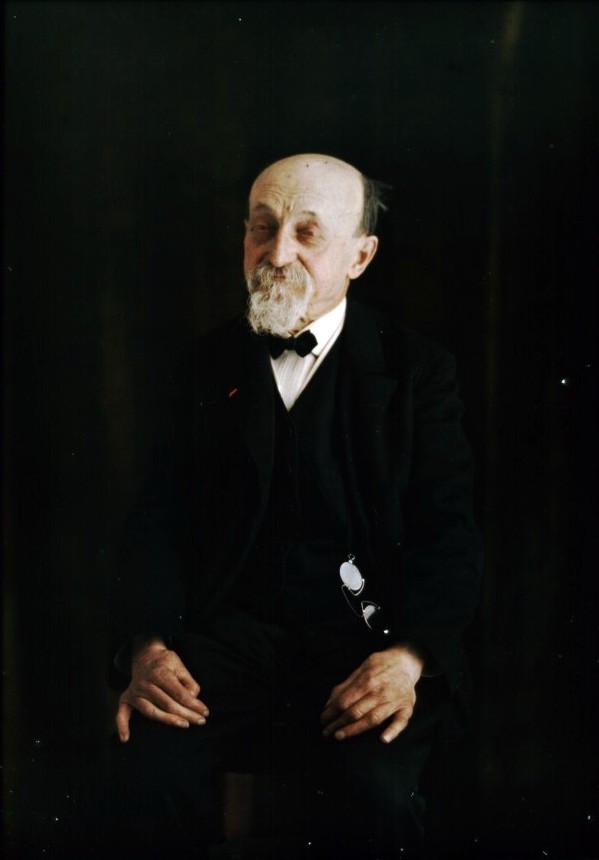
- Louis Ducos du Hauron, photographed on an Autochrome plate in 1910. The Lumière Brothers' Autochrome process was based on one of the several color photography methods he patented in 1868.
- Born: 8 December 1837; Langon, Gironde, France
- Died: 31 August 1920 (aged 82); Agen, Lot-et-Garonne, France
- Known for: Color photography

Louis Arthur Ducos du Hauron (8 December 1837 – 31 August 1920) was a French pioneer of color photography.

== Personal life ==
He was born in Langon, Gironde and died in Agen.

== Photography ==
After writing an unpublished paper setting forth his basic concepts in 1862, he worked on developing practical processes for color photography on the three-color principle, using both additive and subtractive methods. In 1868 he patented his ideas (French Patent No. 83061) and in 1869 he published them in Les couleurs en photographie, solution du problème. The discovery of dye sensitization by Hermann Wilhelm Vogel in 1873 greatly facilitated the initial three-color analysis on which all of Ducos de Hauron's methods depended.

The most widely reproduced of his surviving color photographs is the View of Agen, an 1877 image of a landscape in southern France, printed by the subtractive assembly method he pioneered. Several different photographs of the view from his attic window, one dated 1874, also survive, as do later views taken in Algeria, still life subjects, reproductions of paintings and art prints, and at least two portraits of uncertain date.

In 1891, he introduced the anaglyph stereoscopic print, the "red and blue glasses" type of 3D print. Although others had earlier applied the same principle to drawings or used it to project images onto a screen, he was the first to reproduce stereoscopic photographs in the convenient form of anaglyph prints on paper.

== Gallery ==
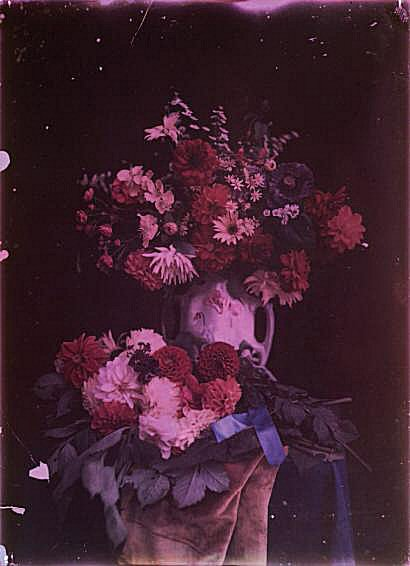
Still life with dahlias, 1869

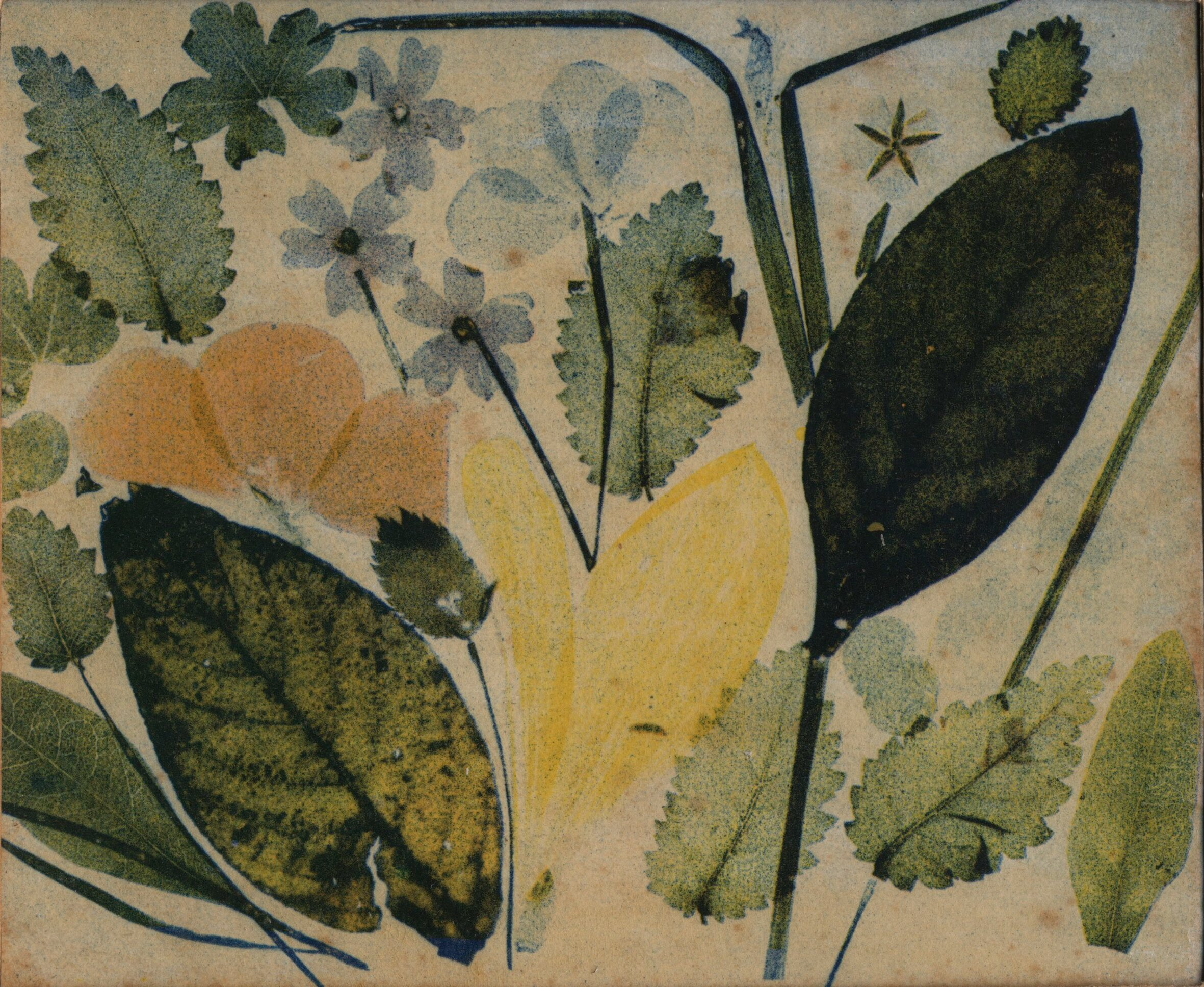
Color print made from three direct photograms, 1869 or 1870

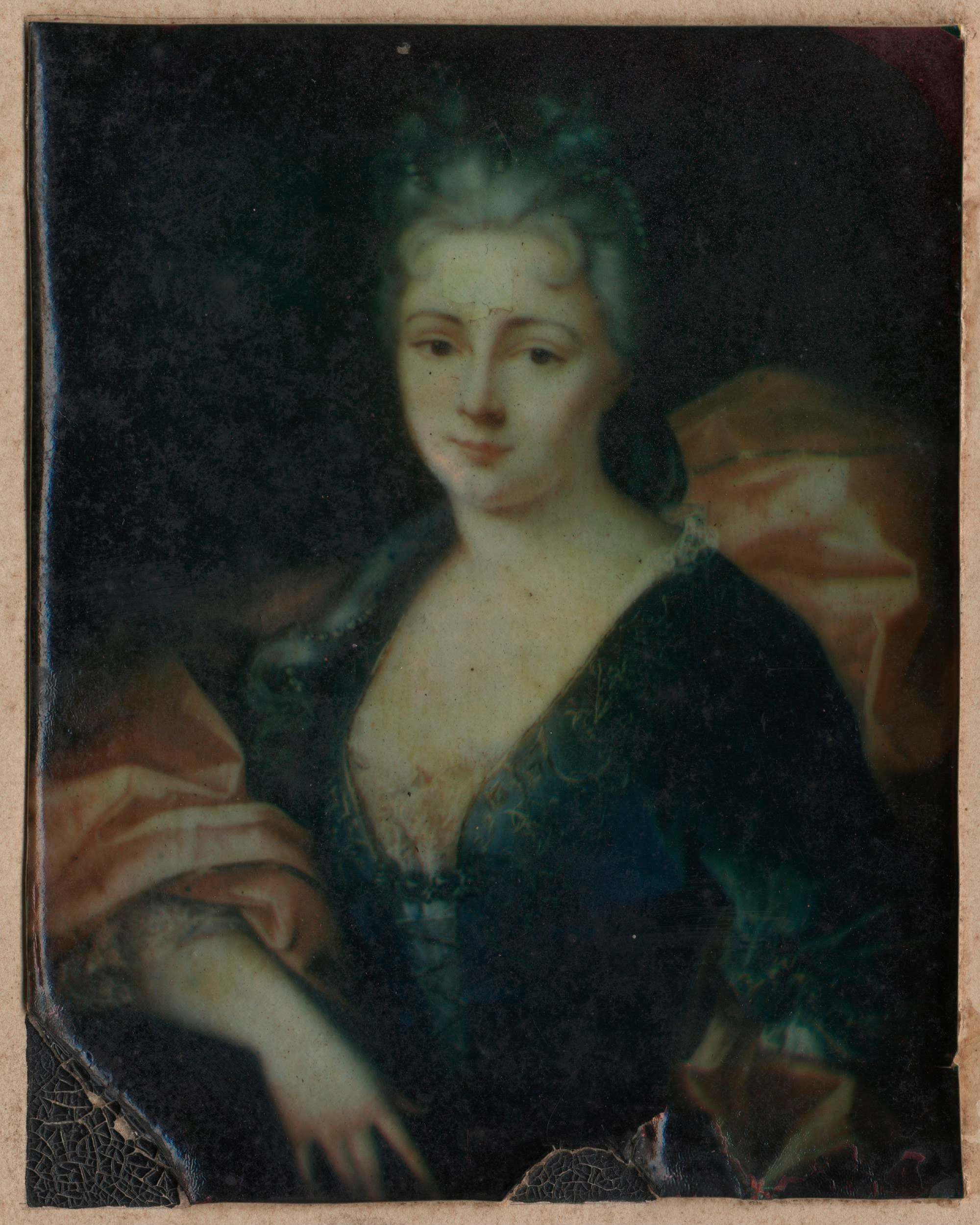
Reproduction of an oil painting, 1873

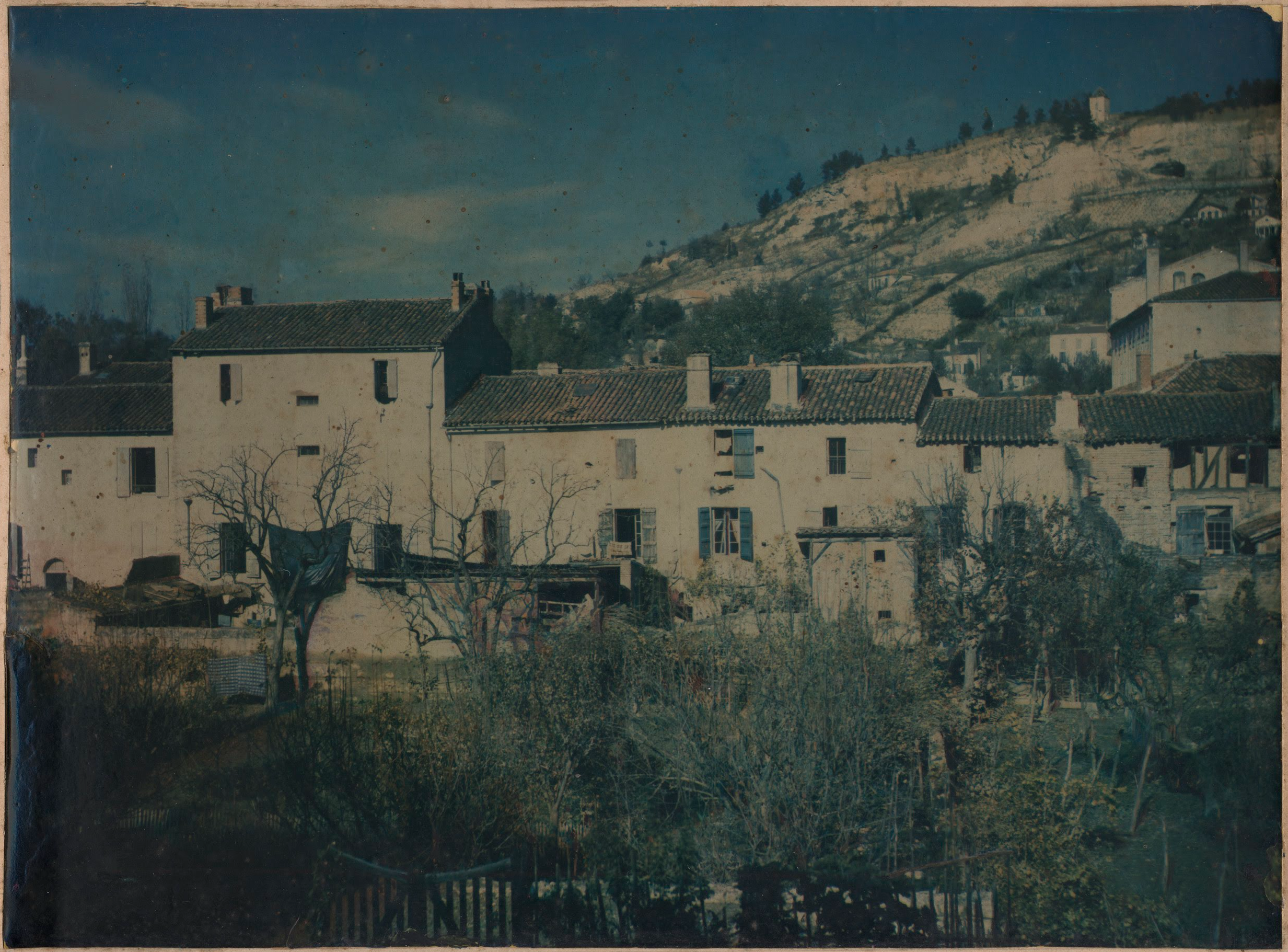
View of Agen, 1875.

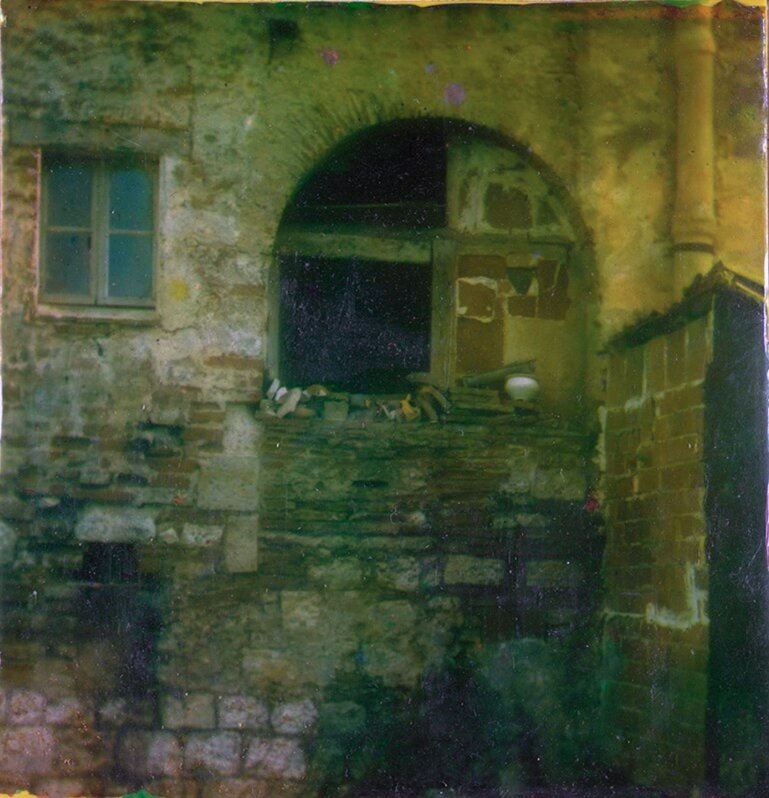
"A hovel in our neighbourhood", Agen, dated 14 March 1877.

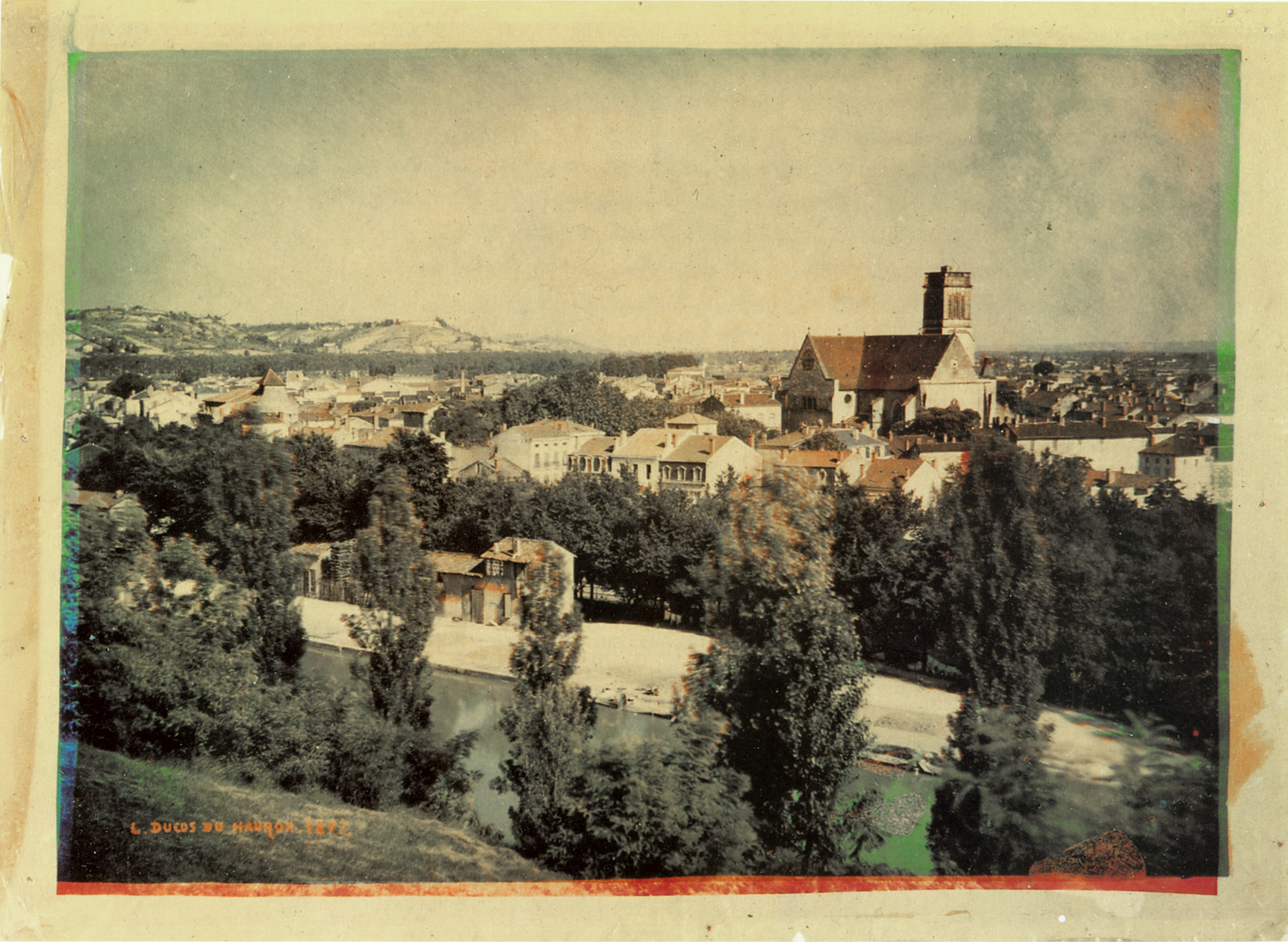
View of Agen, France, showing the St. Caprais cathedral, 1877. Heliochrome (multilayer dichromated pigmented gelatin process). George Eastman House

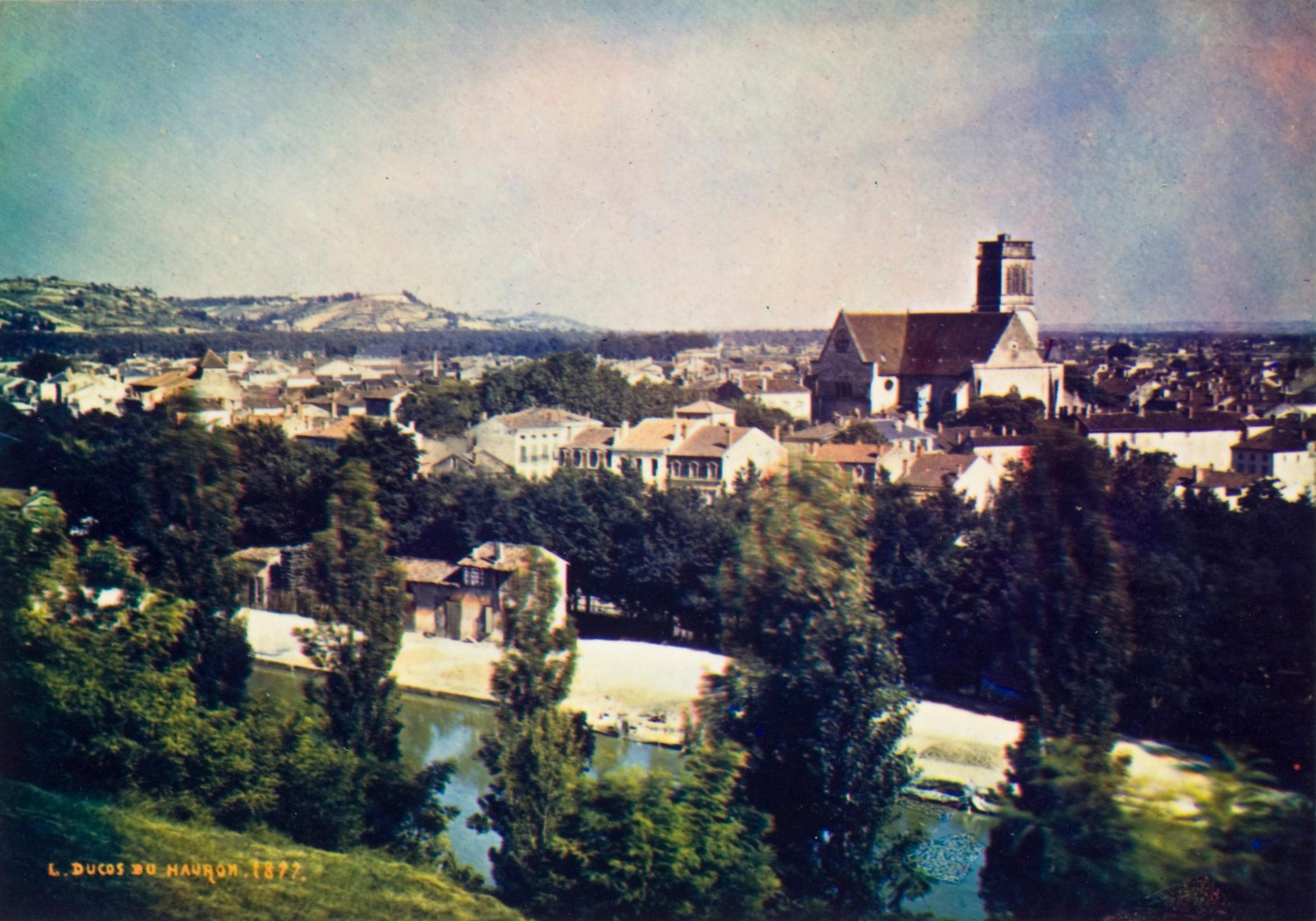
A later 20th century print of the Agen photograph made from the original 1877 negatives. George Eastman House

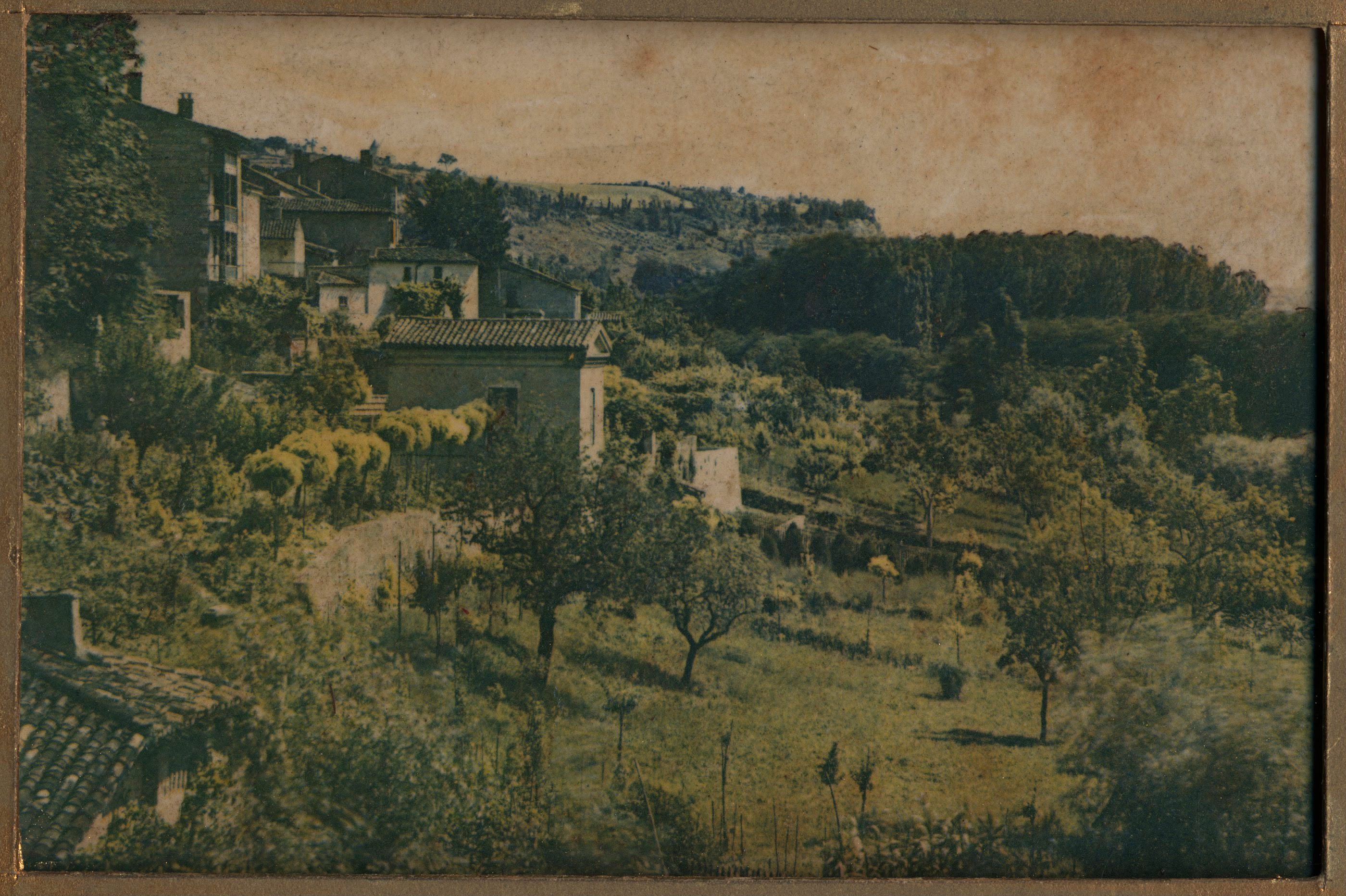
Garden view in Agen, 1877

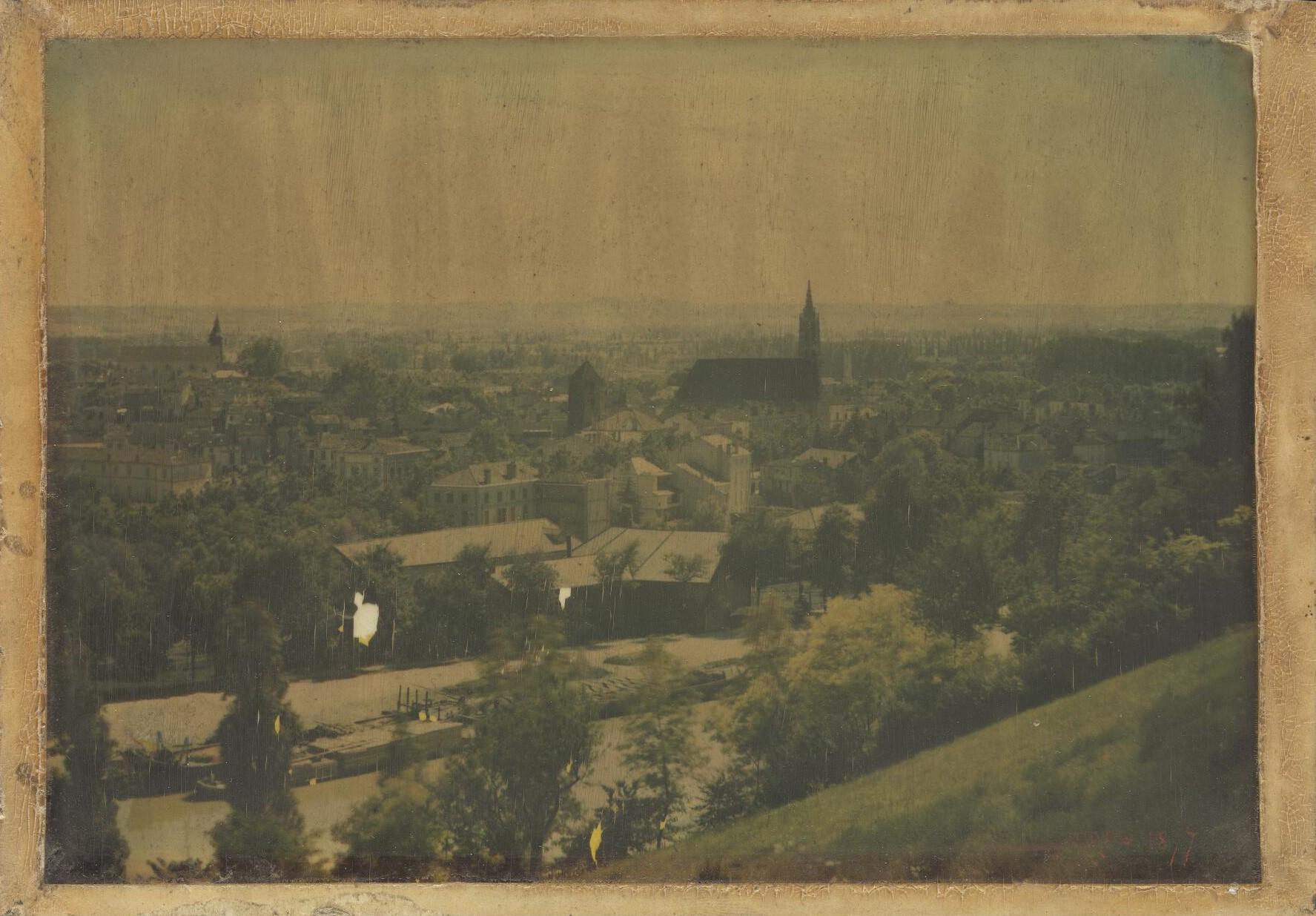
View of Agen, looking southwest, circa 1870s

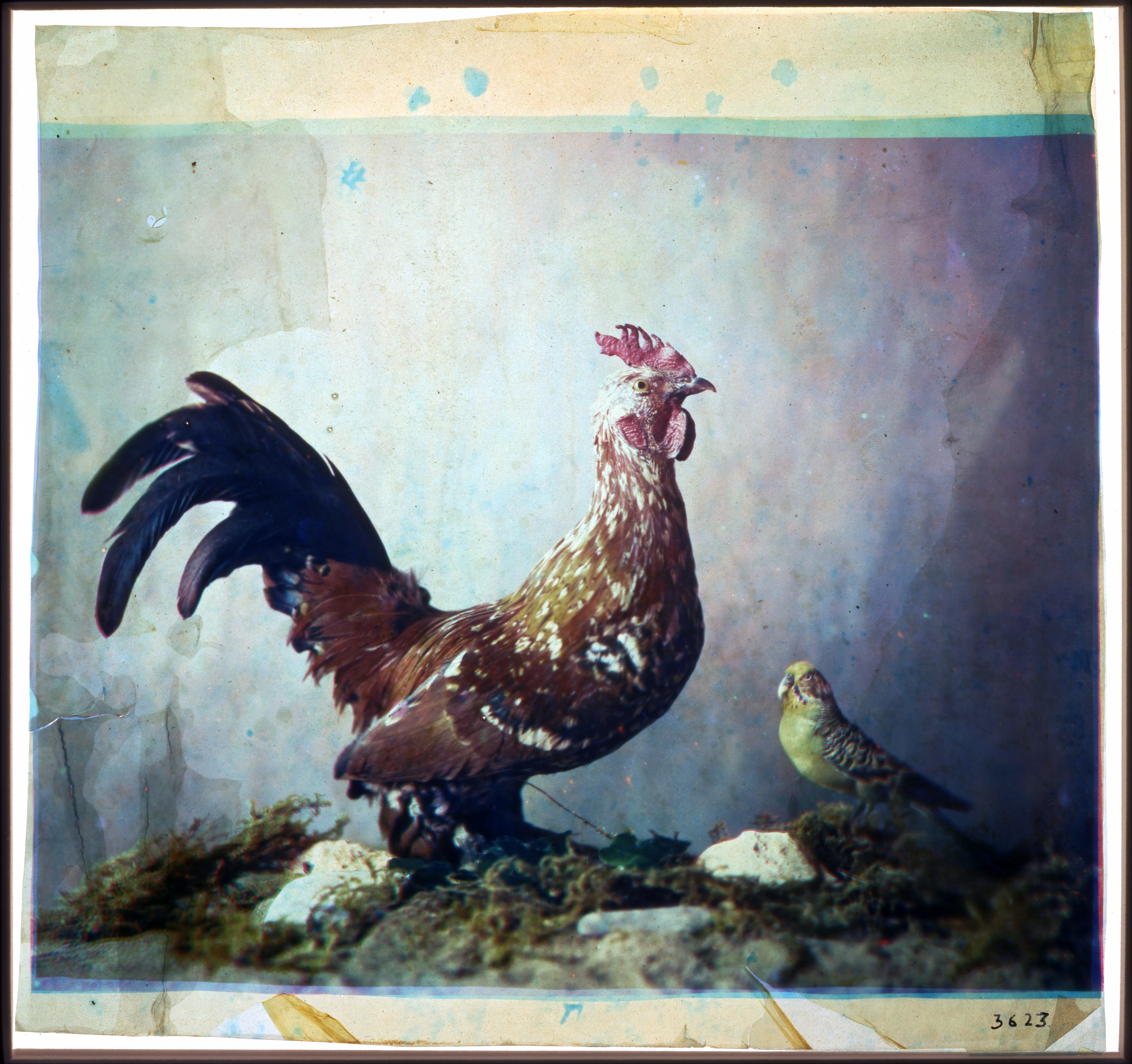
Mounted birds, 1879

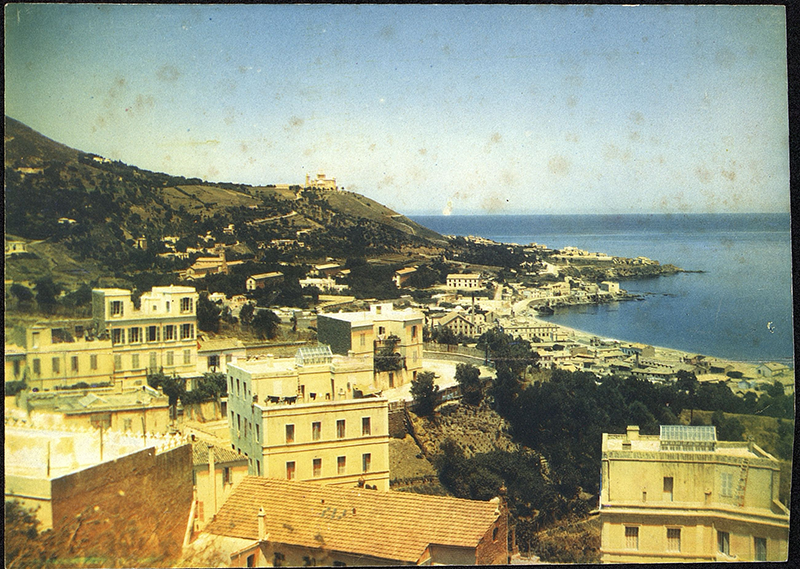
View of Algeria, 1880s or 1890s
