= Rembrandt McClintock =

Alexander Rembrandt McClintock (1901–1968), generally known as Rem, was a professional lithographer based in Melbourne, Australia, active in the 1930s through the 1950s. McClintock was son of the artist Alexander McClintock, cousin of Herbert McClintock, and mentor to the artist Peter Benjamin Graham. He was also active in artistic movements promoting social realism and participated in the Victorian Artists' Society. His work extended beyond art into activism, where he was known for creating banners for trade unions and May Day demonstrations. He also worked closely with the Council for the Encouragement of Music and the Arts CEMA which layer helped establish the Victorian Arts Council
