= Screenless lithography =

Reprographic technique for halftoning

Screenless lithography is a reprographic technique for halftoning dating to 1855, when the French chemist and civil engineer Alphonse Poitevin discovered the light–sensitive properties of bichromated gelatin and invented both the photolithography and collotype processes. After the invention of the halftone screen in the 1880s, screenless lithography was abandoned. Until the end of World War II, two kinds of photomechanically made plates were used in lithography: albumin plates and deep-etch plates. Presensitized plates appeared in the 1950s, and wipe–on plates appeared in the 1960s.

By the mid-1960s research on screenless lithography had successfully developed in Europe to the stage where continuous-tone plates could be manufactured for use with positive film images. Researchers discovered that under certain conditions the combination of fine plate grain and the newly developed plate coatings produced a plate capable of holding nearly all of the tones from a continuous-tone positive. Commercial use of this plate has not flourished; today it is still in limited use, primarily because the continuous–tone printing plate technology is expensive and necessitates stringent quality control.

Since the late 1960s artists and printers have been experimenting with these new plates, using photomechanical film and handmade positives made from thin translucent or transparent plastic sheets and a variety of drawing and painting materials. Screenless lithography has been incorrectly referred to as diazo plate lithography and Mylar lithography.
