= Rene Pauli =

American photographer

René Pauli
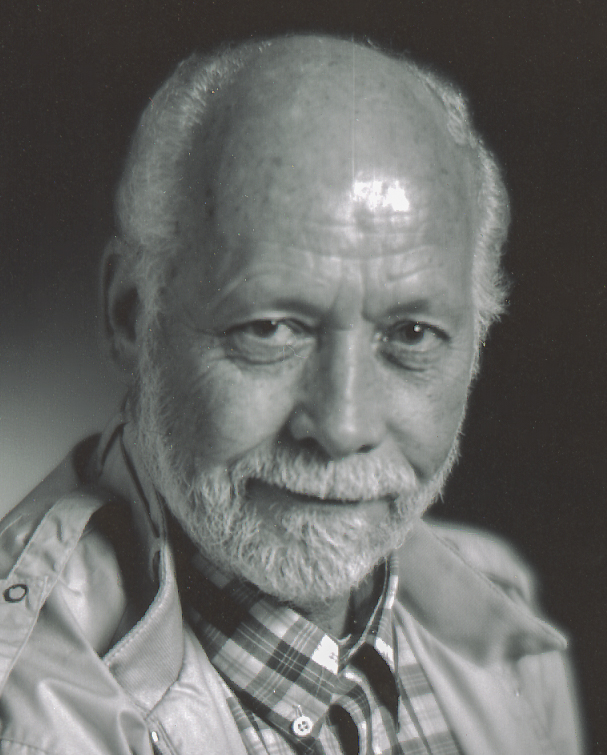
- Born: 1935; Bern, Switzerland
- Died: 1999 (aged 63–64); San Francisco, California
- Known for: Photography and tri-color carbon prints

René Pauli (1935–1999) was a Swiss-American artist known for his original photographs and tri-color carbon print making process. His tri-color carbon prints of original nature photographs were sold in several U.S. photography galleries, featured by an Eastman Kodak exhibition and by the Sierra Club and are included in the collections of the Metropolitan Museum of Art, the Museum of Fine Arts, Houston, and the Polk Museum of Art. René revived and perfected the carbon printing process independently in a small apartment in San Francisco by engineering all hand built machines, even creating his own paper mats. His tri-color carbon prints were noted for their unmatched color, quality and detail, bas-relief effect, and archival permanence, estimated to last virtually unchanged for many hundreds of years.
