= Conflans-sur-Anille =

- Commune
- Location of Conflans-sur-Anille
- Location within France Location within Pays de la Loire
- Coordinates: 47°56′50″N 0°44′43″E
- Country: France
- Region: Pays de la Loire
- Department: Sarthe
- Arrondissement: Mamers
- Canton: Saint-Calais
- Intercommunality: Vallées de la Braye et de l'Anille

Government
  - Mayor (2020–2026): Renaud Gauthier
- Area^{1}: 31 km^{2} (12 sq mi)
- Population (2023): 468
  - Density: 15/km^{2} (39/sq mi)
- Demonym(s): Conflanais, Conflanaise
- Time zone: UTC+01:00 (CET)
  - Summer (DST): UTC+02:00 (CEST)
- INSEE/Postal code: 72087 /72120
- ^{1} French Land Register data, which excludes lakes, ponds, glaciers > 1 km^{2} (0.386 sq mi or 247 acres) and river estuaries.

Conflans-sur-Anille (French pronunciation: [kɔ̃flɑ̃ syʁ anij]) is a commune in the Sarthe department in the Pays de la Loire region in north-western France.

The nearby Chateau De La Barre is the seat of the Comte de Vanssay.

== Famous residents ==
- Alphonse Louis Poitevin, photographer and photographic process technologist

== See also ==
- Communes of the Sarthe department
