= Dultgen =

Printing technique

The Dultgen halftone intaglio process is a photoengraving technique invented by Arthur Dultgen and is widely used today in commercial colour work.

Two positives are made from the continuous tone copy, one through a halftone screen or a special contact screen and the other without a screen.

A sheet of carbon tissue is then exposed first to the screened positive, which produces an image of dots of varying sizes, then to the continuous-tone positive, which produces differing degrees of hardening of the dot image. The array of dots vary not only in width but also in depth so as to extend the range of tonal values to be reproduced. This method thus uses two methods for controlling tonal values.
