= Walter B. Woodbury =

British photographer and inventor (1834–1885)

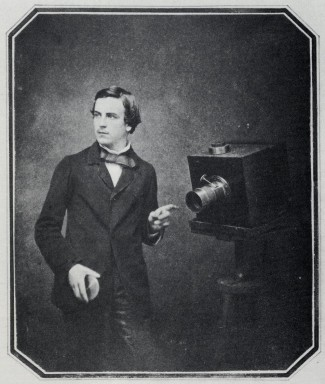
- Born: Walter Bentley Woodburry; 26 June 1834; Manchester, England
- Died: 5 September 1885 (aged 51)
- Known for: Woodburytype process

Walter Bentley Woodbury (26 June 1834 – 5 September 1885) was an inventor and pioneering English photographer. He was an early photographer in Australia and the Dutch East Indies (what is now Indonesia). He also patented numerous inventions relating to various aspects of photography, his best-known innovation being the woodburytype photomechanical process.

== Early years ==
Walter B. Woodbury was born in Manchester, England on 26 June 1834. (Note: Anglo-American Name Authority File) His father, John, died at the age of 36, when Walter was only 12. He then went to live with an uncle after his mother remarried.

In 1848 he left school and began work as an apprentice draftsman in a civil engineering firm in Manchester.

In his spare time he became interested in photography and taught himself how to take and develop photographs. He was technically minded and was able to construct his own camera obscuras from cigar boxes and eyeglass lenses.

The discovery of rich goldfields in Australia in 1851 drew young men from the United Kingdom and elsewhere to try their luck on the diggings. Walter Woodbury was one of them. He departed by sea on 5 July 1852 with three friends. His mother paid his fare and provided a little spending money.

== Australia ==
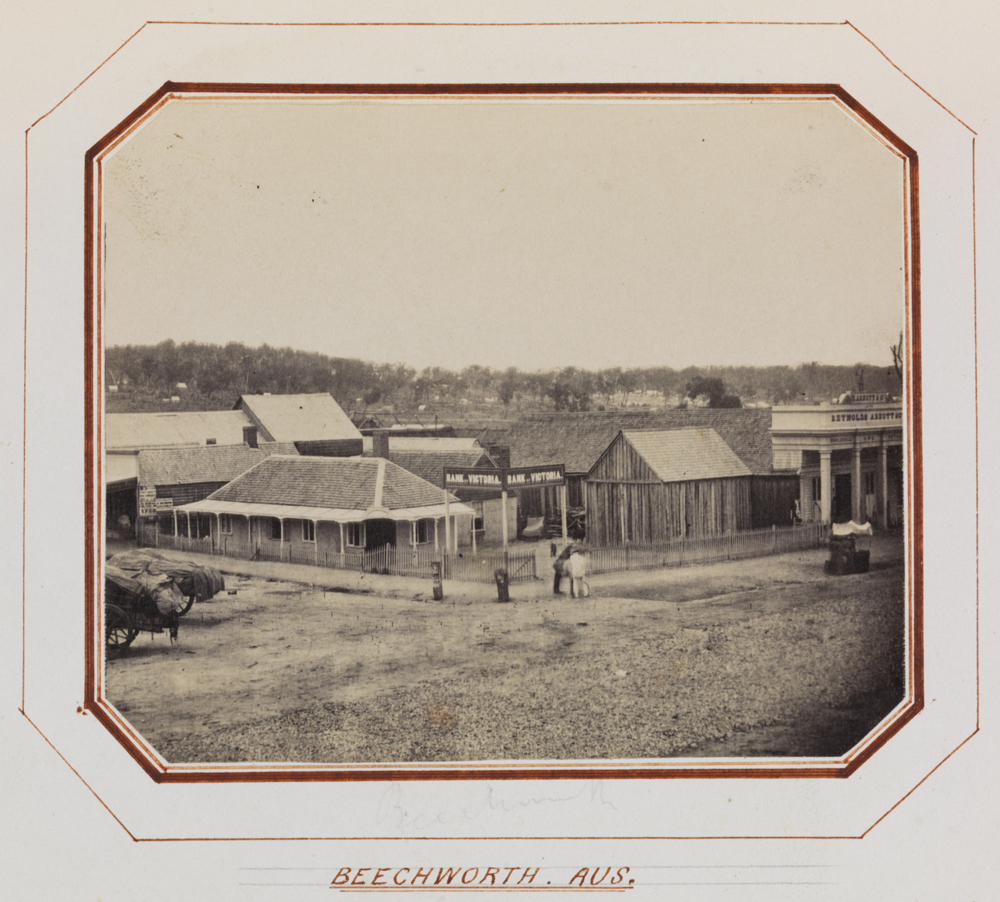
Beechworth, c1856. Photo by W.B. Woodbury

Woodbury was 18 years of age when he arrived at Melbourne on the Seramphore (950 tons) in October 1852. He had intended to immediately go to the diggings but changed his mind after hearing not one in a hundred was earning enough to pay for their food.

He found a job as a wagon driver taking supplies to the diggings and sleeping by the road at night with a bag of oats as a pillow. He was then briefly a cook at a roadside inn on the way to the gold fields.

Next he worked for a surveyor's office as a draftsman copying plans of sub-divided allotments in South Melbourne. During this time he lived in a tent city established on the south bank of the Yarra River, rental accommodation being scarce and expensive. His employer was the surveyor William Dawson (1820-1873) who was active in the colony at the time. They worked in rural Victoria where in February 1853 they did a survey for the township of Meredith and surveyed the route of a new road from Geelong to Ballarat. He liked his employer and taught him photography.

He next worked as a draftsman for the Commission of Sewers and Water Supply that had an office in William St, Melbourne. He photographed the construction of ducts and other waterworks under construction for the Yan Yean Reservoir as well as various buildings in Melbourne. The quality of his work was recognised and he received a medal for “9 views of Melbourne, taken by the collodion process on glass” at the Victorian Exhibition in 1854.

He decided to see if he could earn a living from his photography. He travelled into through central Victoria and visiting towns such as Kyneton. He and another young man named Spencer then travelled to the goldfields of the north-east to see if they could earn a living from making portraits of the miners. They settled for a few months at the gold-mining town of Beechworth, where they established a studio and took photographs of the Spring Creek and Woolshed Creek diggings.

By December 1855, he had established himself as a portrait photographer with a studio in North Melbourne. That year he created the first photographic panorama in Australia. It was a set of photographs of Melbourne taken from a tower on the outskirts of the city. He was offering for sale stereoscopic views of Melbourne and environs by April 1857.

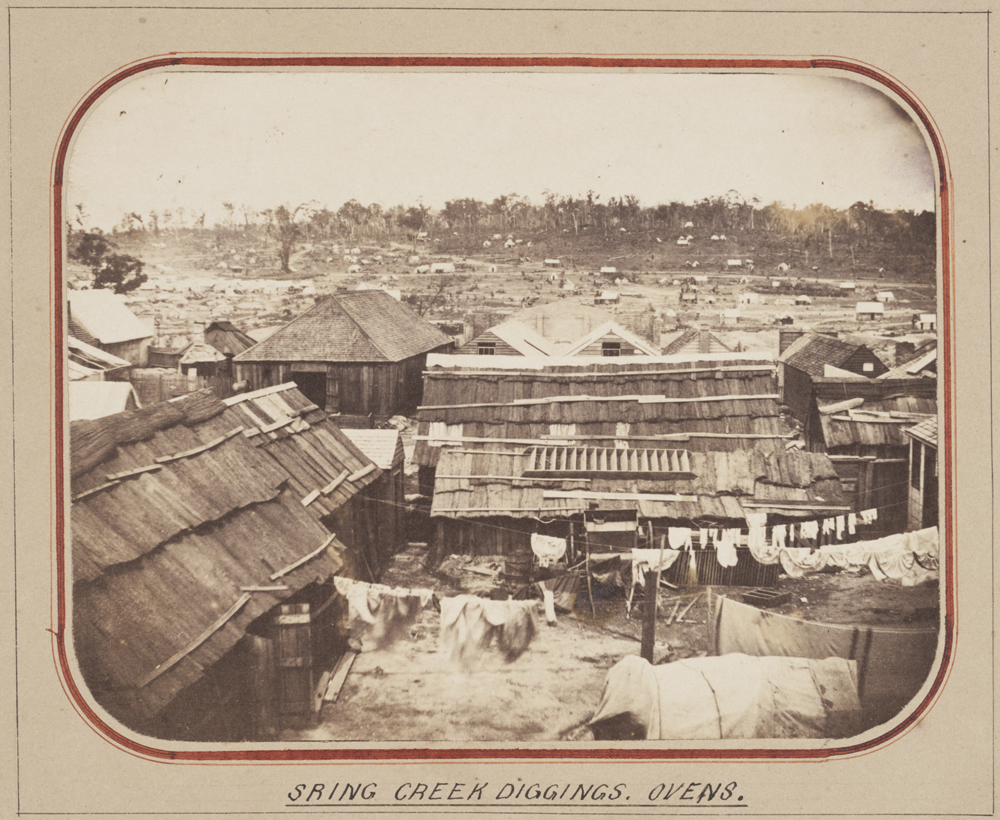
Spring Creek, 1856

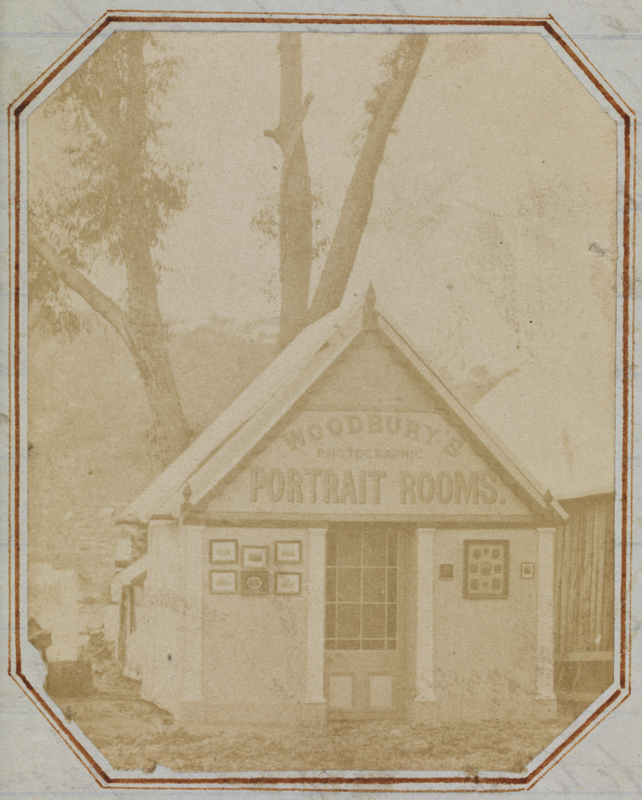
“Woodbury's Photographic Portrait Rooms”, Woolshed Creek, August 1856

At some point in the mid-1850s Woodbury met expatriate British photographer James Page (1833-1865). In 1857 the two left Melbourne and sailed for Japan, China, Japan and the Philippines. They arrived at Batavia (now Jakarta), Dutch East Indies, on 18 May 1857. They decided to stay and established the partnership of Woodbury & Page that same year. (Note: Bloom gives the date of their arrival in Batavia as the Fall of 1856)

== Java, Sumatra and Borneo ==
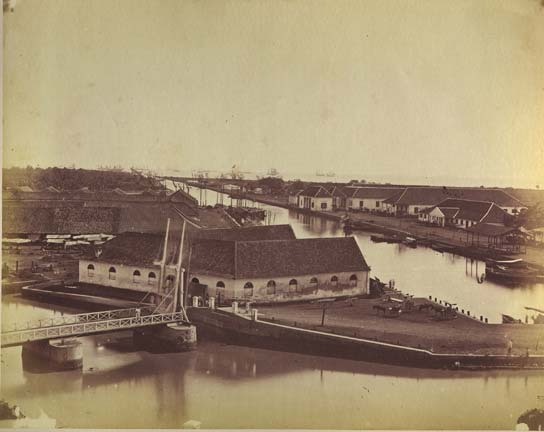
The Haven Canal, Batavia, c. 1870. Albumen silver print.

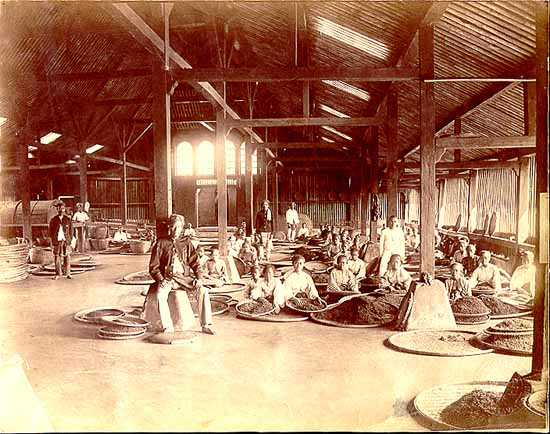
Tea factory interior. Preanger, Java, mid-1860s. Albumen silver print.

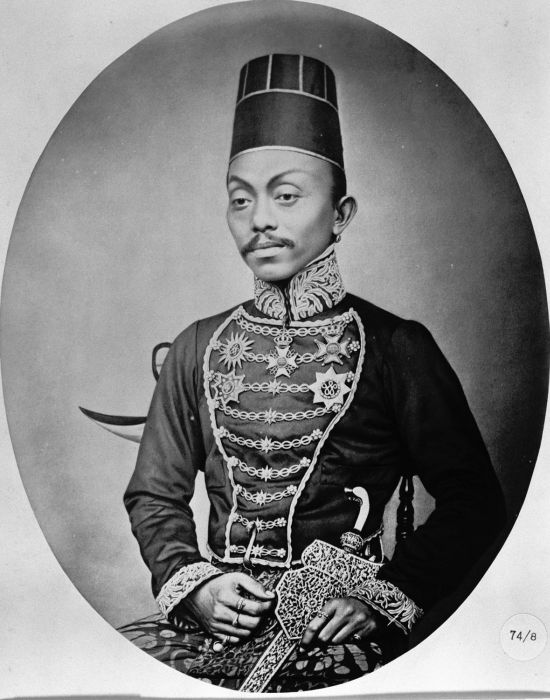
'Pakoe Boewono IX', the ninth Susuhunan (ruler of Surakarta). Photo by W.B. Woodbury

During most of 1858 Woodbury & Page photographed in Central and East Java, producing large views of the ruined temples near Surakarta, amongst other subjects, before 1 September of that year. After their tour of Java, by 8 December 1858 Woodbury and Page had returned to Batavia.

In 1859 Woodbury returned to England to arrange a regular supplier of photographic materials for his photographic studio and he contracted the London firm Negretti and Zambra to market Woodbury & Page photographs in England.

Woodbury returned to Java in 1860 and during most of that year travelled with Page through Central and West Java along with Walter's brother, Henry James Woodbury (born 1836 – died 1873), who had arrived in Batavia in April 1859.

Woodbury & Page sold photographs of topographical views, temples and portraits of high ranking Dutch officials and members of Indonesian aristocracy. They had a large collection of photos of “native type,” craftsmen, servants, dancers, musicians and food vendors. These were sold to tourists and Dutch officials as individual postcards or in albums. They also accepted commissions to take portraits of indigenous dignitaries and their retinues. The firm regularly advertised their products and services in newspapers.

On 18 March 1861 Woodbury & Page moved to new premises, also in Batavia, and the studio was renamed Photographisch Atelier van Walter Woodbury, also known as Atelier Woodbury. The firm sold portraits, views of Java, stereographs, cameras, lenses, photographic chemicals and other photographic supplies. These premises continued to be used until 1908, when the firm was dissolved.

In his career Woodbury produced topographic, ethnographic and especially portrait photographs. He photographed in Australia, Java, Sumatra, Borneo and London. Although individual photographers were rarely identified on Woodbury & Page photographs, between 1861 and 1862 Walter B. Woodbury occasionally stamped the mounts of his photographs: "Photographed by Walter Woodbury, Java".

== Return to England and further endeavours ==
In late January or early February 1863, Woodbury left Java to return to England, because of ill health. (Note: Bloom gives the date of his return as 1862, Bloom, 30) (Note: Auer and Auer give the date as 1864)

Having returned to England, Woodbury invented the Woodburytype photomechanical reproduction process, which he patented in 1864. (Note: Auer and Auer give the date 1866) Between 1864 and 1885 Woodbury took out more than 30 patents in Britain and abroad for inventions relating to balloon photography, transparencies, sensitised films and improvements in optical lanterns and stereoscopy. In addition to his inventions, Woodbury produced photographs documenting London's poor.

In 1865 his Woodburytype process was bought by the Photo Relief Company, then bought by the Woodbury Permanent Photographic Printing Company and then bought by a succession of other companies in Britain and elsewhere.

== Personal life ==
Woodbury married Marie Sophia Olmeijer in 1863. The couple had eight children.

== Death and memorial ==
Walter B. Woodbury died on 5 September 1885 while on holiday in Margate, England. He was buried at Abney Park Cemetery in Stoke Newington, close to London, where his family memorial stands to this day. His gravestone notes that he was a “photographic artist.”

The Victoria and Albert Museum and the National Gallery of Australia have some of his photographs in their collections as does the Rijksmuseum in Amsterdam and the National Science and Media Museum, Bradford.
