= Autotype =

Autotype is a function in some computer applications or programs, typically those containing forms, which fills in a field once you have typed in the first few letters. Most of the time, such as in a web browser, the entries that appear in the list depend on the form's name, so as to not propose street names in a last name field or vice versa.

== Background ==
Autotype can also refer to automatically determining a peripheral's configuration or a program's variables.

Autotype is defined as a "true representation of the original" (see O.E.D.).

The term autotype was coined in the late 19th century and referred to a process for making photographic prints using a carbon process. Many autotype prints were produced and the process was popular well into the 20th century, particularly since autotype prints are very long lasting (it is said that an autotype could last up to 500 years without fading).

Autotype may also refer to halftone printing. The term may also apply to the Autotype Company, founded in London in 1868 as the "Autotype Fine Art Company", which was one of the pioneers in the carbon print and autotype reproduction process and which still exists as a supplier of coated films. Autotype is now part of the Platform Speciality Products group of companies.

== See also ==
- Autotype (printing)
- Autocomplete
- Autofill
- Context sensitive user interface
- Combo box
