= Carbon print =

Photographic printing process

A carbon print is a photographic print with an image consisting of pigmented gelatin, rather than of silver or other metallic particles suspended in a uniform layer of gelatin, as in typical black-and-white prints, or of chromogenic dyes, as in typical photographic color prints.

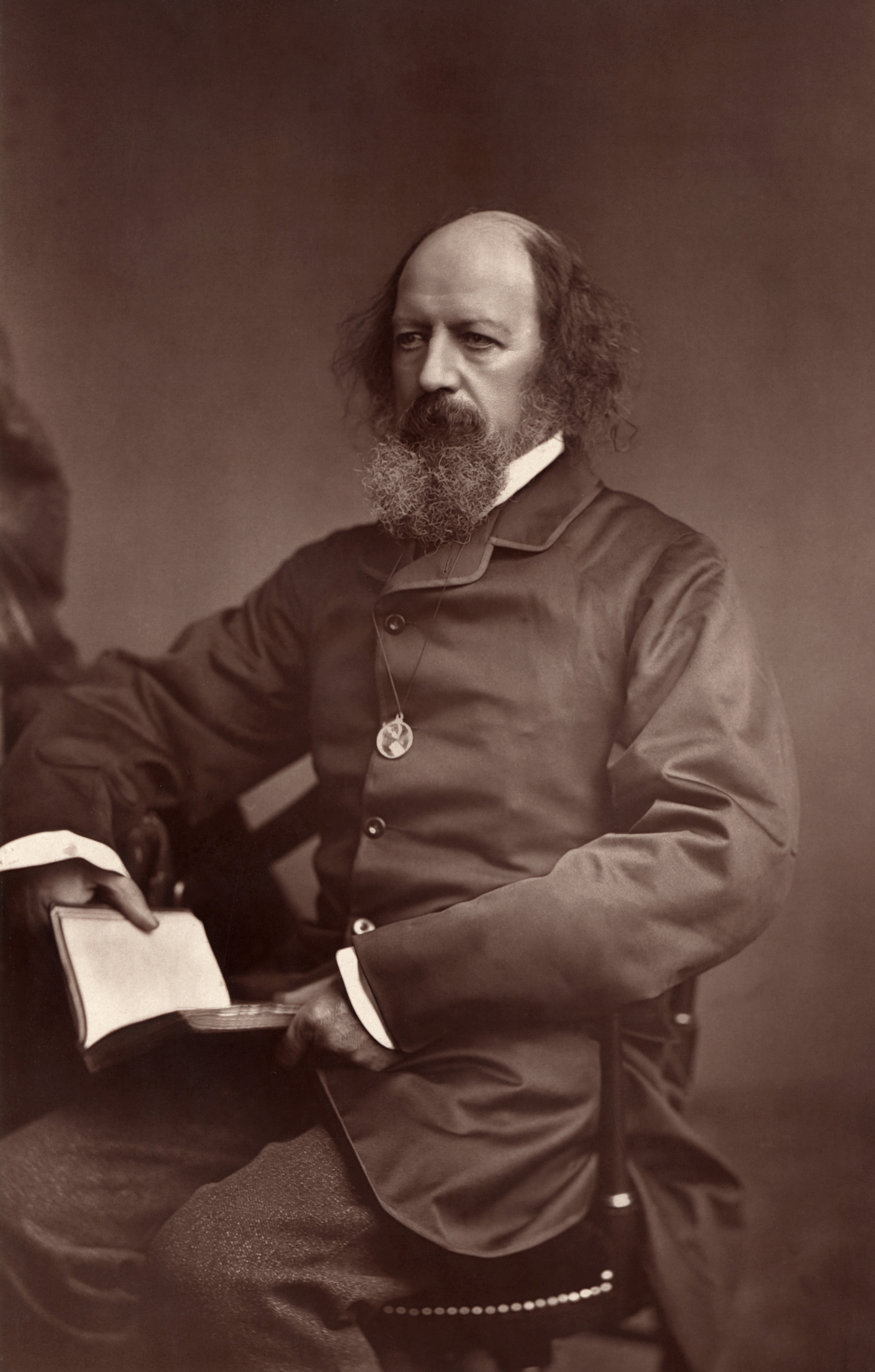
Carbon print of Alfred, Lord Tennyson by Elliott & Fry

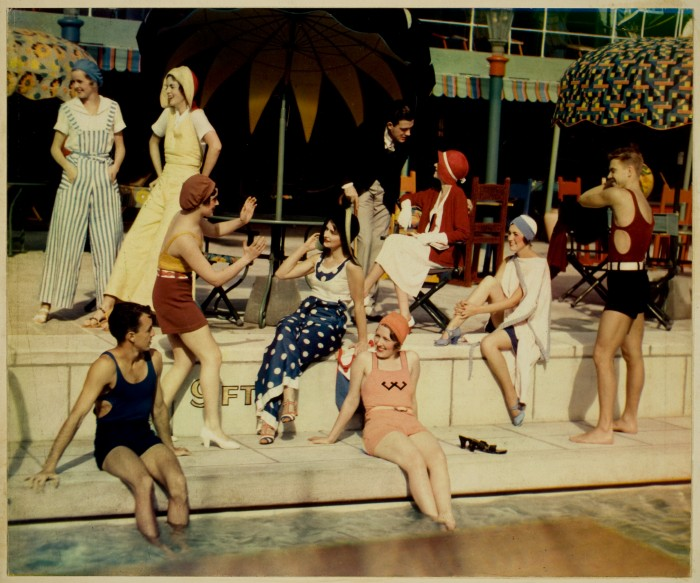
1932 Carbro process color print by Nickolas Muray

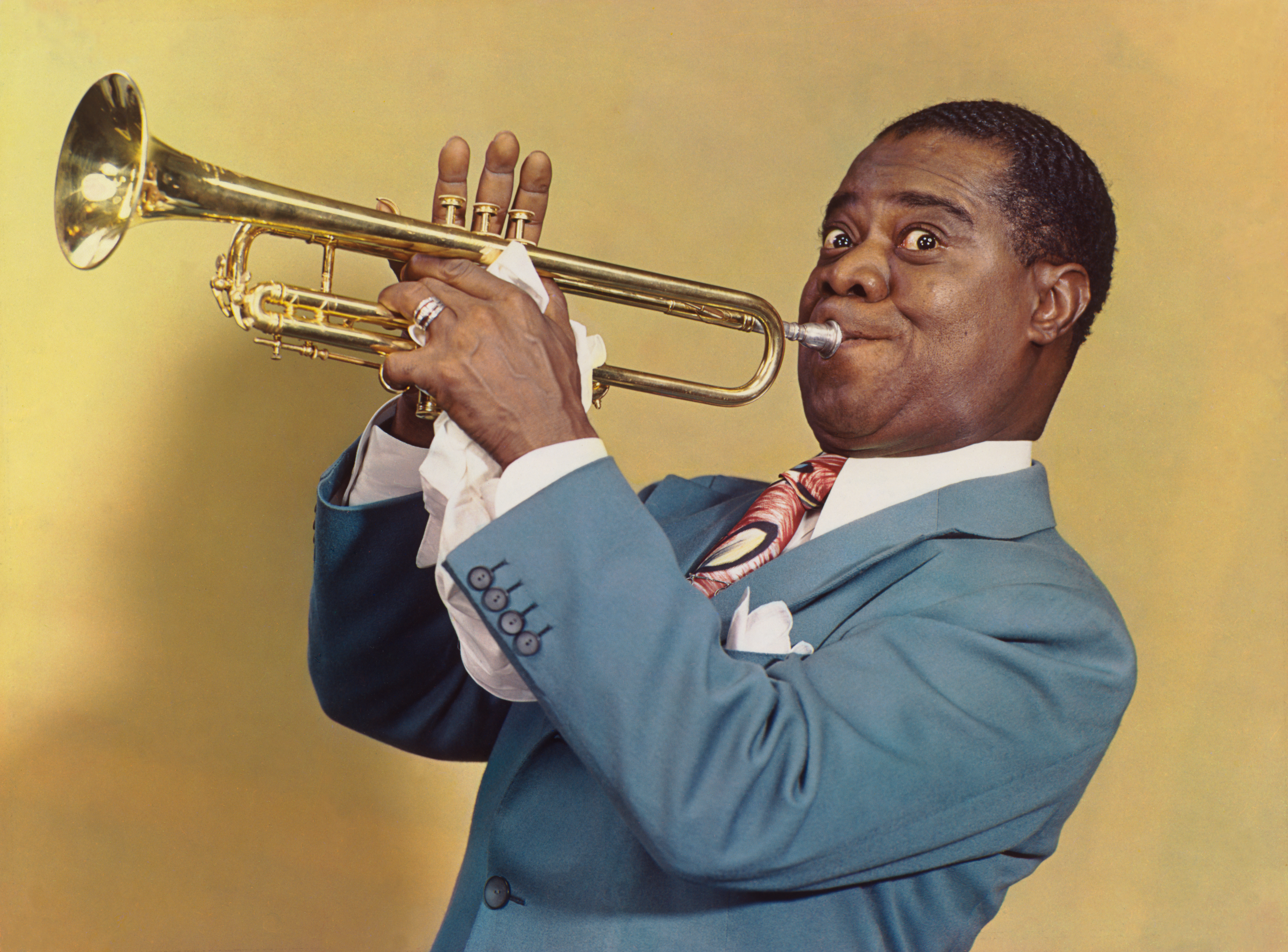
Carbon print of Louis Armstrong playing Trumpet by the Harry Warnecke Studio, 1947

In the original version of the printing process, carbon tissue (a temporary support sheet coated with a layer of gelatin mixed with a pigment—originally carbon black, from which the name derives) is bathed in a potassium dichromate sensitizing solution, dried, then exposed to strong ultraviolet light through a photographic negative, hardening the gelatin in proportion to the amount of light reaching it. The tissue is then developed by treatment with warm water, which dissolves the unhardened gelatin. The resulting pigment image is physically transferred to a final support surface, either directly, or indirectly via an intermediate support such as glass. In an important early 20th century variation of the process, known as carbro (carbon-bromide) printing, contact with a conventional silver bromide paper print, rather than exposure to light, was used to selectively harden the gelatin. A wide variety of colored pigments can be used instead of carbon black.

The process can produce images of very high quality which are exceptionally resistant to fading and other deterioration. It was developed in the mid-19th century in response to concerns about the fading of early types of silver-based black-and-white prints, which was already becoming apparent within a relatively few years of their introduction.

The most recent development in the process was made by the American photographer Charles Berger in 1993 with the introduction of a non-toxic sensitizer that presented none of the health and safety hazards of the toxic (EU-restricted) dichromate sensitizer.

== Carbon tissue ==
Carbon tissue, a layer of unsensitized pigmented gelatin on a thin paper support sheet, was introduced by British physicist and chemist Joseph Swan in 1864. Marketing began in 1866. Initially, his ready-made tissues were sold in only three colors: black, sepia and purple-brown. Eventually, a wide array of hues became available. Carbon tissue was a stock item in Europe and the US well into the 20th century, but by the 1950s carbon printing was very rare and supplies for it became an exotic specialty item. Some companies produced small quantities of carbon tissue and transfer papers for monochrome and three-color work until around 1990.

== Overview and history of carbon printing ==
The carbon process, initially a black-and-white process using lampblack (carbon black), was invented by Alphonse Poitevin in 1855. The process was adapted to color through the use of pigments by Louis Ducos du Hauron in 1868. Carbon printing was in use from about 1870 to the end of the 1930s. It was replaced over time by the dye-transfer process, chromogenic, dye-bleach (or dye destruction, e.g., Cibachrome) and digital printing processes. The efficiencies gained through these more modern automated processes relegated carbon printing to the commercial backwaters in the latter half of the 20th century. The process was revived in 1970 as part of the alternative process photography movement, and it is now practiced mainly by enthusiasts and a few specialist laboratories.

Carbon printing is based on the fact that gelatin, when sensitized to light by a dichromate, is hardened and made insoluble in water when exposed to ultraviolet light. Because of the comparative insensitivity of the material, sunlight or another strong source of UV light is normally used to minimize the required exposure time. To make a full-color print, three negatives photographed through red, green and blue filters are printed on dichromate-sensitized sheets of pigmented gelatin (traditionally called "carbon tissue" regardless of the pigment incorporated) containing, respectively, cyan, magenta and yellow pigments. They are developed in warm water, which dissolves the unhardened gelatin, leaving a colored relief image that is thickest where it received the strongest exposure. The three images are then transferred, one at a time, onto a final support such as a heavy sheet of smooth gelatin-sized paper. Usually, the yellow image is transferred first, then the magenta image is applied on top of it, great care being taken to superimpose it in exact register, and then the cyan image is similarly applied. A fourth black pigment "key" layer is sometimes added, as in mechanical printing processes, to improve edge definition and mask any spurious color cast in the dark areas of the image, but it is not a traditional component.

The resulting finished print, whether composed of several layers and in full color or having only a single monochrome layer, exhibits a very slight bas-relief effect and a variation of texture on its surface, both distinctive characteristics of a carbon print. The process is time-consuming and labor-intensive. Each color carbon print requires three, or four, round trips in the darkroom to create the finished print. An individual, using existing pigmented sheets and separations, can prepare, print and process enough material, 60 sheets including the support, to produce about twelve 20" x 24" four-color prints in a 40-hour work week. However, this investment of time and effort can create prints of outstanding visual quality and proven archival permanence.

The carbon process can be used to produce:

- Monochrome prints, usually black-and-white, but they may be sepia, cyan or any other preferred color.
- Duochrome (duotone) prints, an effect many printers are familiar with, using complementary or associated colors to their best effect.
- Trichrome prints, traditional full-color prints made by layering YMC (yellow, magenta and cyan) pigment sheets.
- Quadrachrome prints, essentially full-color trichrome prints with an added black K (key) layer to increase density and mask any spurious color in dark areas.

Any combination of layers, in any color, is possible to achieve whatever ends the printer desires. There are two primary techniques used in carbon printing: single transfer and double transfer. This has to do with the negatives (separations) being right- or wrong-reading and the image "flopping" during the transfer process. Swan's single-transfer process produced a laterally reversed image, so he also developed a double-transfer process to restore the correct orientation.

Carbon prints made only with carbon-based pigments are not susceptible to light fading; prints made with organic dyes can fade, depending on the light sensitivity of the dyes.

Though carbon printing has been, and remains, a labor-intensive, time-consuming and technologically demanding process, some practitioners prefer its aesthetic and longevity over other processes.

Chronological History of Carbon (Pigment) Printing

Date	Name	Nationality	Remarks
1798	Louis Nicolas Vauquelin	French	Influence of light on silver chromate
1827	Joseph Nicéphore Niépce	French	First permanent photograph of the image formed by a camera lens
1832	Gustav Suckow	German	Chromic acid salts are light sensitive, even without silver
1839	Sir John Herschel	English	Introduction of the word "photography", early experiments with creating prints in various colors
1839	Mungo Ponton	Scottish	Action of light on paper coated with potassium dichromate + washing = fixed image
1840	Edmond Becquerel	French	Action of light on paper coated with potassium dichromate + iodine fumes = fixed image
1852	William Henry Fox Talbot	English	Dichromated gelatin rendered insoluble by exposure to light
1855	Alphonse Poitevin	French	Invents photographic printing by dichromated pigment process
1855	James Clerk Maxwell	Scottish	Color photography by three-color analysis and synthesis, proposed in passing in a paper on color vision
1858	L'abbé Laborde	French	Principle of exposure through the base then transfer from one base to another (see Fargier)
1860	Fargier	French	Principle of exposure through the base then transfer from one base to another (see Laborde) but the image is reversed
1860	Blaise	French	Double transfer to get a non-reversed image
1861	James Clerk Maxwell	Scottish	Demonstration of photographic color reproduction by synthesis (additive method, three images superimposed by projection through filters)
1862	Louis Ducos du Hauron	French	Photographic color printing by the three-color subtractive method proposed in an unpublished paper
1863	Pouncy	English	Uses sensitized inks
1863	Poitevin	French	Modification of his process: insolubility of the pigmented gelatin then solubility by exposure through a positive film
1864	Joseph Wilson Swan	English	Swan process: uses rubber for the transfer
1867	Charles Cros	French	Unaware of work being done by Louis Ducos du Hauron (see 1862) invents similar methods for photographic color reproduction
1868	Marion	French	Procédé Marion: Uses an albuminated paper for the transfer
1868	Louis Ducos du Hauron	French	Patents the basic principles of most of the practical color photography processes subsequently developed
1869	Charles Cros	French	Publishes Solution générale du problème de la photographie des couleurs
1869	Louis Ducos du Hauron	French	Publishes Les couleurs en photographie, solution du problème
1869	Jeanrenaud	French	Double transfer with an opal glass
1870	Gobert	French	1870-1873 printing on metal plates
1873	Marion	French	Mariotype
1873	Hermann Vogel	German	Discovers dye sensitization of silver halides, making creation of three-color separation negatives practical
1878	Louis Ducos du Hauron	French	Publishes improved methods of color photography and printing by the carbon process
1878	Fredéric Artigues	French	Charbon velours
1881	Charles Cros	French	Tricolor process prints presented to the Académie des Sciences (French Academy of Sciences)
1889	Artigues	French	Papiers charbon velours
1893	Victor Artigues	French	Carbon velours à tons continus de 1893 à 1910
1894	Rouillé-Ladevèze	French	Papier gomme-chrome
1899	Thomas Manly	English	Ozotype derived from mariotype
1899	Henri Theodore Fresson	French	Procédé Fresson: sold in USA between 1927 and 1939 by Edward Alenias.
1900	Fresson	French	Papier charbon Satin then papier Arvel to be processed with chlorine
1902	Robert Krayn	American	N.P.G. Process: tricolor carbon process distributed in France by La Société Industrielle de Photographie
1905	Thomas Manly	English	Ozobrome process: instead of exposure to light, contact with a silver bromide print selectively hardens the dichromated gelatin
1913	S. Manners	English	Ozobrome
1919	Autotype	English	Carbro process based on Manly's ozobromie, Sold by Autotype in London from 1920 to 1960
1923	H.J.C. Deeks	American	Raylo: three color carbon
1930s	Madame Yevonde	English	Vivex
1951	Pierre Fresson	French	Quadrichromie Fresson
1982	Archival Color Co.	American	TriColor Carbon Pigment Prints/Materials developed by Charles Berger manufactured by Polaroid
1993	UltraStable Color	American	Ultrastable Color System; Four-Color Carbon Pigment Films developed by Charles Berger.
2015-	The Wet Print	American	Extended gamut printing involving up to 14 negatives, variable contrast emulsions, triple transfer prints with selective gloss.

== Artists known for carbon prints ==
- Julia Margaret Cameron
- Rudolf Koppitz
- Nickolas Muray (carbro process)
- Rene Pauli

== See also ==
- Laser printing, which uses carbon pigment fused with styrene binder, imaged with optical and digital technology
- Oil print process, another process based on hardened gelatin
- Woodburytype, a variation of the carbon process
