= Alphonse Louis Poitevin =

French chemist, photographer and civil engineer (1819-1882)

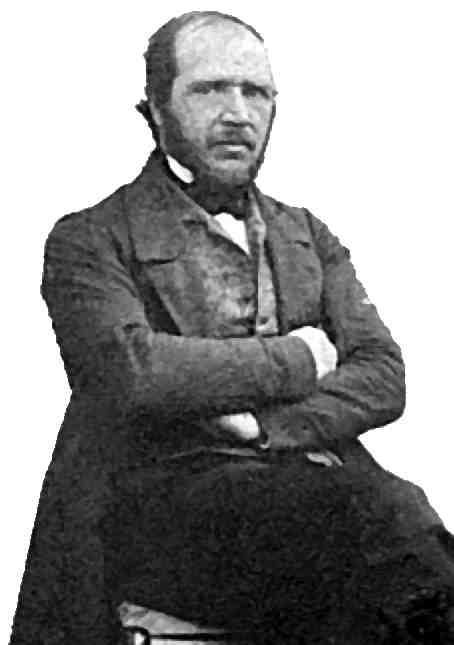
Alphonse Louis Poitevin.

Alphonse Louis Poitevin (Conflans-sur-Anille, 1819 – Conflans-sur-Anille, 1882) was a French chemist, photographer and civil engineer who discovered the light–sensitive properties of bichromated gelatin and invented both the photolithography and collotype processes.

He has been described as "one of the great unheralded figures in photography". In the 1850s he discovered that gelatin in combination with either potassium or ammonium bichromate hardens in proportion to the amount of light that falls on it. This discovery, significant for its capacity to facilitate the mass production of photographs, was later used by numerous figures such as Josef Albert, Joseph Wilson Swan, Paul Pretsch and Charles Nègre to develop subsequent photographic printing processes such as heliogravure, photogravure, collotype, autotype and carbon print.
