= Carbon tissue =

Chemical used in printing

Carbon tissue is a gelatin-based emulsion used as a photoresist in the chemical etching (photoengraving) of gravure cylinders for printing. This was introduced by British physicist and chemist Joseph Swan in 1864. It has been used in photographic reproduction since the early days of photography.

Carbon materials marketing began in 1866 by Joseph Swan which he subsequently sold to the Autotype Company in 1868. His ready-made tissues were in three colours black, sepia and purple-brown. This method was used in Europe and USA throughout the 19th century and well into the 20th. This market was almost closed in the 1950s although some companies produce small amount of carbon tissue and transfer papers for monochrome and three-color work until around 1990

== Method ==
The gelatinous emulsion is applied to a paper backing, and is rendered sensitive to light when immersed in a 3:4% solution of potassium bichromate. After drying, it is ready for use. The carbon tissue is first exposed to a film positive. In those areas where the carbon tissue has received the most light (i.e., non-image areas and highlights) the emulsion becomes thick and hard, and the thickness and hardness decreases with decreasing exposure to the light source, the emulsion being thinnest and softest in image areas corresponding to shadows and solids. After developing the carbon tissue, it is adhered to the surface of the copper-plated cylinder.

A solution of ferric chloride etchant is applied to the surface of the cylinder, where it eats away the copper through the carbon tissue. In the highly exposed areas, where the carbon tissue photoresist is thickest and hardest, the etchant takes a long time to eat through the hard emulsion, while in the least exposed, thinnest regions the etchant eats through the resist into the copper very quickly. Thus, in a given period of etching, the cells etched into the copper will be deepest (and thus will print the darkest) in those regions where the etchant has eaten through the quickest, while the cells etched into the copper will be the shallowest (and thus print the lightest) in those regions where the etchant has eaten through the slowest.

== Usage ==
Carbon tissue resists were the first chemical etching media, but have been replaced by photopolymers, and chemical etching as a whole is being increasingly replaced by electromechanical engraving and computer-to-cylinder laser-cutting processes. (See Gravure Engraving.)

Carbon tissue resists have also been used extensively for the manufacture of photostencils in screen printing.

== See also ==
- Carbon print
