= Australian artist-run initiatives =

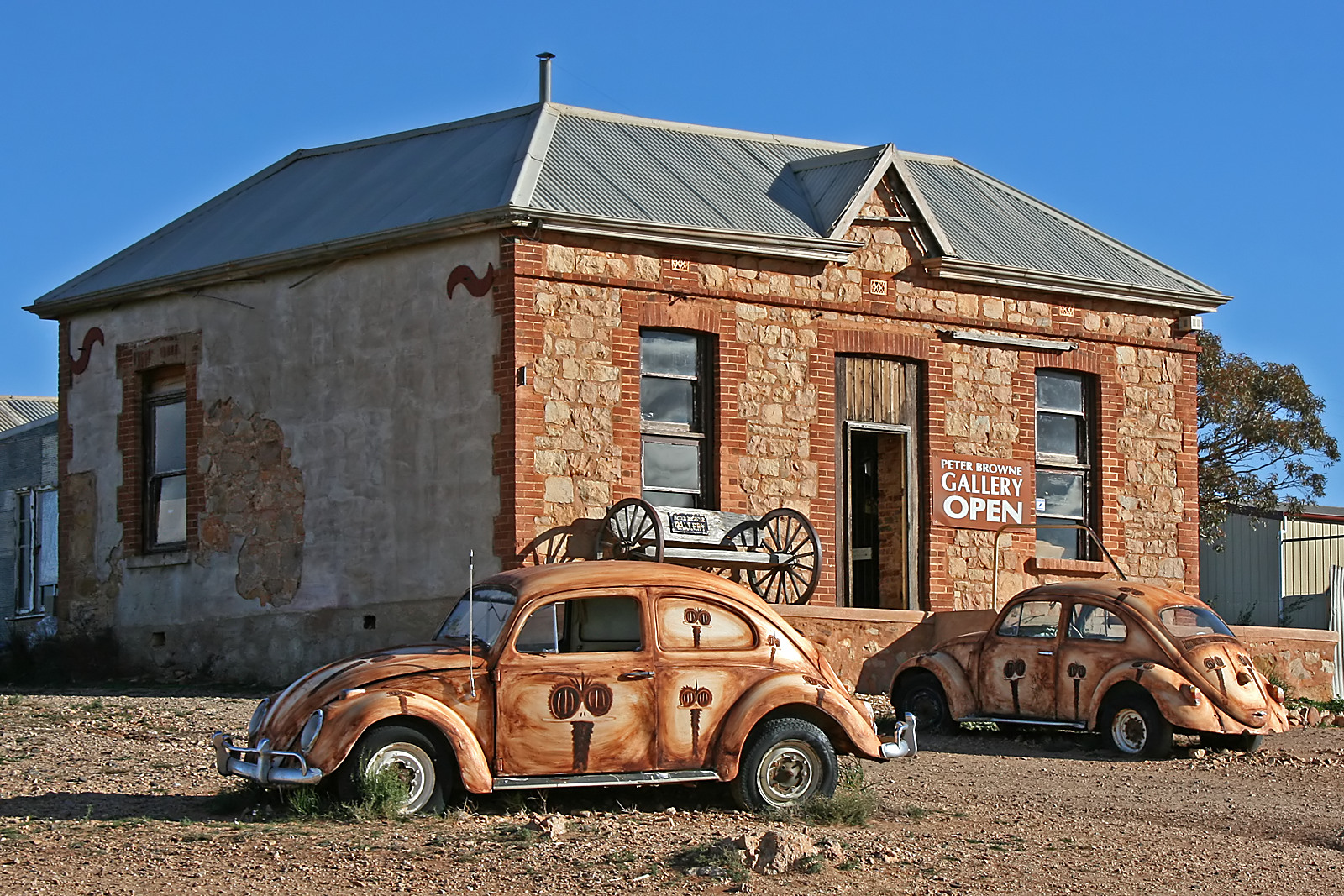
The Peter Browne Gallery, an artist-run initiative, operates out of a renovated ruin in Silverton, New South Wales.

Australian artist-run initiatives are a series of artist-run initiatives and galleries found throughout Australia. A few key spaces include FELTspace (Adelaide); LEVEL and Boxcopy (Brisbane); The Walls Art Space (Gold Coast); BUS Projects, KINGS ARI, TCB, Clubs Project inc, West Space, Seventh Gallery, Yarra Sculpture Gallery, Blindside and Trocadero Art Space, Exit Strategy Studios (Melbourne); Free Range (Perth); Firstdraft, MOP and Serial Space (Sydney); and Project Contemporary Artspace (Wollongong).

Academic and historian Paul Andrew currently runs the ARI Remix project which collects contemporary information and lists archival information about Australian based ARIs.

Funded by a three-year Australian Research Council Fellowship Dr Maria Miranda researched the cultural economy of artist-run initiatives across Australia. Studio visits for all were documented in a blog 2013–2018. This research included visiting artist spaces across the country, including the often overlooked "Aboriginal Art Centres in Arnhem Land and outside Alice Springs and regional art spaces".

== Brisbane artist-run initiatives ==
Brisbane is home to many currently active and innovative artist-run initiatives, including Outer Space, Wreckers Artspace, and Boxcopy.

BNE ART is an independent digital visual arts guide, live-archive resource and access point for the online public wishing to learn more about Brisbane's visual arts sector.

== Tasmanian artist-run initiatives ==
Constance ARI, formerly known as Inflight, is a long-running artist-run initiative based in Hobart. Inflight began in 2003, re-launching in early February 2013 as Constance ARI. In 2015, it moved from a physical gallery-based model to an off-site project based model. In 2017, Constance ARI hosted a major arts festival, Hobiennale, bringing ARIs from Australia and New Zealand to Hobart for ten days of exhibitions, talks, and performances.

Visual Bulk is a small ARI based in inner-city Hobart. The program features a mix of visual art exhibitions, performance art, and music performances.

6a was a significant artist-run initiative based in North Hobart from 2007 to 2011.

Sawtooth ARI is a gallery based in Launceston, showcasing contemporary and experimental art by local, interstate and international artists at various stages of their professional career.

== Perth-based artist-run initiatives ==
PRAXIS was an early artist-run initiative which had a fifteen-year history of producing an important program of visual arts exhibitions, publications and special projects. Artists included Brian McKay and Paul Thomas. The Verge/KURB was another, which also produced a publication that documented it and many others from the 1970s through to the 1990s. Terminus= group was another active in the later 1990s.

The oldest, currently operating artists studios is Gotham Studios, which has been a dedicated art-making studio since 1987. The second oldest is Farmer Street Studio, which relocated and renamed from Robertson Park Artists Studio (2000–2023), and before that the Wellman Street Studio / Select Plumbing Studio (1994–2000). In 2014, Paper Mountain produced a limited survey exhibition of emerging artist-run initiatives.

== Sydney-based artist-run initiatives ==
Other important non-gallery artist initiatives include NUCA (Network of UnCollectable Artists), Sydney art galleries and art community (SAGAC), The Invisible Inc., the Artist Funded project, the Sydney Ladies Artists Club and Articulate Project Space.

== Victorian artist-run initiatives ==
Early examples of artist run initiatives include The Queensbery Street Gallery operated by Melbourne artist Peter Graham in association with Victorian Printmakers' Group between 1973 and 1978. Still running, as of 2026 are West Space, which is part of Contemporary Arts Organisations Australia (CAOS); and the Yarra Sculpture Gallery, a gallery run by the Contemporary Sculptors Association, was established in 1997, and is one of the earliest ARIs on the Melbourne art scene.

Other current examples of Victorian artist-run initiatives include PORT ART in Port Melbourne, BLINDSIDE, TCB art inc., Kings ARI, The Wandering Room, Rubicon ARI, Platform, Knight Street Art Space and Punk Cafe.

Artist-run initiatives in Melbourne, Victoria, are promoted by VIA-n, the Victorian Initiatives of Artists Network, a volunteer network that includes more than 20 ARI organisations spread across metropolitan and regional Victoria. In April 2007, VIA-n released a publication on the history of ARIs in Victoria called Making Space in conjunction with simultaneous artist-run events across the state.

The Australia Council for the Arts has also produced a comprehensive list of Australian artist-run initiatives in operation in 2006.
