= Chandler Coventry =

Australian grazier and art collector

Chandler ("Channy") Phillip Coventry AM (1924–1999) was an Australian grazier, art collector, gallerist, art dealer, and art patron and was involved with the establishment of the New England Regional Art Museum.

== Early life ==
Chandler was born at a private hospital on Brown Street, Armidale, New South Wales, Australia on 4 December 1924, the second son of Arthur Isaac Chandler Coventry [1881-1962] and Joan (née Books) [1886-1971] of ‘Alor-Amia' station, north-east of Armidale. His siblings were David and Beatrice.

The Coventrys were an established and wealthy New England grazing family. Their ancestors arrived in Australia from Scotland in 1836 and settled in the New England district in 1839. Generations and branches of the family had taken up several properties in the district, including 'Rockvale Station' with its old homestead where Chandler, along with his brother and sisters, spent much of his time as a child.

Coventry was educated as a boarder at The Armidale School and at Barker College, Sydney. In school breaks and holidays he took his part in farm work on the family property.

== Career ==
=== Grazier ===
Following his schooling, Chandler returned to farming on family properties. When he was just twenty he inherited a pastoral run, 'Tulloch', and money from his uncle David. Returning from a grand tour in England and Europe with his sister Beatrice in 1952 he found that his brother David had sold the home property Rockvale Station. Chandler proceeded to sell off some of his own assets to buy it back as sole owner. Through several purchases and bequests he eventually owned more than 15,000 acres of land. Over many years he built a reputation for sheep breeding and producing some of the finest wool in Australia. He also bred cattle, notably Murray Grey cattle on the property Essington he acquired near Bowral, NSW.

=== Art Collector and gallerist ===
Coventry’s earliest encounters with fine art were through the Howard Hinton Collection, which he saw as a schoolchild displayed in the rooms and corridors of the Armidale Teachers’ College. He furthered this interest in Sydney, reading, visiting art shops and galleries, and soon beginning to collect. By the time he was twenty one he had built a collection of original artworks including a Fairweather, a Boyd and a Drysdale. He progressively lined the walls of the family homestead with paintings, prints and drawings, and invited friends, art lovers and school students to visit and share his enjoyment. Angela Bennie quoted Coventry, "I fell in love with art. I became obsessed with it. I became obsessed with art and collecting it. And I became obsessed with the young artists who made it"

From the early 1950s he divided his time between farm management and trips to Sydney and overseas, before moving more permanently to Sydney in 1965 while leaving Rockvale in the care of a manager. In 1968 he got involved in managing Sydney's influential Central Street Gallery. He became the gallery's financial backer and a co-director. He mixed in Sydney's art circles and helped promote contemporary artists including Wendy Paramor, Denise Green, Dick Watkins, Leslie Dumbrell, Vernon Treweeke, and Gunter Christmann among many.

In 1970 Coventry opened his own gallery in his house at 38 Hargrave Street, Paddington, Sydney. Several Central Street artists followed him. When space at Hargrave Street proved insufficient Coventry in 1974 purchased and renovated the much larger building at 56 Sutherland Street, Paddington and created the second Coventry Gallery which finally closed after his death in 1999. The Coventry Gallery is a landmark in Australian gallery history, energetically showing new and emerging Australian artists as well as staging exhibitions by leading overseas artists such as Bridget Riley and David Hockney.

Coventry built his personal collection of art over decades from his youth through his time as a gallerist. At the peak of his collecting, from the 1960s to the 1980s, he favoured current art - freshly made, and by artists who were not yet established. While he did not pursue fashions or a particular school of art, he acquired innovative and challenging works, in the Central Street Gallery and early Coventry Gallery years notably abstract, colourfield and hard-edge, then after 1972 his taste embraced painterliness, lyrical abstraction, even gesture and figuration.

Art historian Patrick McCaughey said of Channy "He has been the epitome of the adventurous private collector, collecting new and advanced art with an enthusiasm most collectors reserve for more established figures" Some works hung in his Sydney home, but many more were hung on the walls of his Armidale property, Rockvale Station. His art collection was described by James Mollison, inaugural Director of the Australian National Gallery, as "one of the most important private collections of contemporary Australian Art".

=== Art patron and benefactor ===
Coventry is described as "a quintessential country boy who became a leader in cutting edge contemporary art, championing new and dynamic artists, and supporting artists heading for and hitting the peak of their careers."

Besides generously nurturing, encouraging, promoting and purchasing from individual artists, Coventry backed numerous art projects. He hosted an exhibition at Central Street Gallery, sold paintings from his own collection, including a Drysdale, to help fund Christo and Jeanne-Claude’s Wrapped Coast at Sydney's Little Bay in 1969, and supported several of John Kaldor's other Kaldor Public Art Projects including Gilbert & George, and Charlotte Moorman. Chandler invited many of these visiting international artists to use his property Rockvale Station as a base, giving them an opportunity to experience the Australian bush.

In 1966 Coventry made his first donation of more than fifty works to the Armidale City Collection, now part of the New England Regional Art Museum. In 1979, he gave a large portion of his private collection to Armidale on the understanding that an art museum would be built to house both his collection and the Howard Hinton collection then housed in the Armidale Teacher's College. Reflecting contemporary art movements of the 1960s and 1970s, Coventry's collection would complement Hinton's strength in Australian art of the first half of the twentieth century.

Coventry's offer was the catalyst for a regional fundraising campaign to establish the museum that was to become the New England Regional Art Museum (NERAM). Coventry was himself an active driving force in the establishment of the NERAM, not only through the donation of the bulk of his collection of contemporary art, but also through his profile in the art world and his extensive connections in farming and grazing communities. One fundraising venture was a selling exhibition at the Coventry Gallery in 1980 of works donated to the NERAM appeal. He became a founding trustee and patron of NERAM. Selections from the Coventry collection are regularly on exhibit at NERAM.

Besides his contributions to the New England Regional Art Museum, Coventry donated works to the National Gallery of Australia, Art Gallery of New South Wales, Queensland Art Gallery, National Gallery of Victoria, Power Gallery of Contemporary Art at the University of Sydney, Penrith Regional Gallery & The Lewers Bequest, Campbelltown Art Gallery and the Wollongong Art Gallery.

== The Chandler Coventry Collection at NERAM ==
The Chandler Coventry Collection at the New England Regional Art Museum reflects art movements of the 1960s and 1970s. Australian artists represented include Ralph Balson, Peter Booth, Gunter Christmann, Janet Dawson, Elaine Haxton, Leah MacKinnon, Michael Taylor, Dick Watkins and Brett Whiteley. Notable international artists include Christo and Jeanne-Claude and Charlotte Moorman.

Coventry, a survey exhibition in 2020 at NERAM explored his legacy and included the 1983 Archibald Prize winning Portrait of Chandler Coventry by artist Nigel Thompson as well as works by Angus Nivison, Martin Sharp, Janet Dawson, Peter Booth and Brett Whiteley.

== Later life ==
The stress of running a gallery in Sydney and a fine wool property six hundred kilometres north, while advocating and fundraising for an art museum in Armidale, brought Coventry to the decision in 1979 to sell Rockvale Station.

In 1980 Coventry suffered two strokes that paralysed the left side of his body and necessitated he use a wheelchair for the rest of his life. He maintained his interest in contemporary Australian art but it was three years before he was able to get his gallery going again with the help of his long-term partner Phillip Shepherd. A wave of new names exhibited in the gallery in the 1980s including David Larwill, Christopher Hodges, Aida Tomescu, and Nigel Thomson. He showed Melbourne's Roar Studio artists to Sydney in 1985. In the 1990s the gallery exhibited further new artists including Emily Kame Kngwarreye, Bronwyn Bancroft, and David Bromley. Rather than succoring a stable of artists as other galleries do, Coventry continually found new talents and new directions. He jealously guarded his role of selecting artworks, maintaining the relationships with artists, and setting the ambience of the gallery.

Coventry was devastated by his disability in the years following his stroke. Nigel Thomson's 1983 Archibald-Prize winning portrait of Chandler reveals a bitter and crestfallen man in a wheel-chair alone in the empty Coventry Gallery. Channy commented "... it says what I feel ... It is what I am". After his stroke he was at times gloomy and irascible, uncareful to contain his feelings and opinions. Angus Nivison described him as "definitely a difficult pleasure: yet he was always generous and thoughtful"

Following the incorporation of the Chandler Coventry Collection into the New England Regional Art Museum (NERAM) Channy kept a close and critical eye on the activities of NERAM. He disliked the fact that the bulk of both Hinton and Coventry collections were kept in storage rather than on display. He vehemently disapproved of NERAM's sale of two non-Australian works from the Hinton Collection, obviously concerned that a similar fate may befall works from his own donation after his demise. He objected to the commercialism of NERAM's annual fund-raising Packsaddle exhibition.

Chandler Coventry died on 14 September 1999 in his downstairs apartment at the Coventry Gallery. His funeral service was held at St. Stephen's Church on Macquarie Street, Sydney. Coventry Gallery closed on 4 December 1999.

== Exhibitions from Coventry's personal collections ==
- Coventry Collection, 1966-76, University Hall, University of New England, 1976.
- Wollongong City Gallery, 1978.
- The 1960s into the 70s: selections from the Chandler Coventry collection., Monash University, Department of Visual Arts Exhibition Gallery, 1978.
- Early Collecting by Chandler Coventry 1947-1967, Armidale City Art Gallery, 1981
- Chandler Coventry / a private collection, Campbelltown City Art Gallery 1993.
- Chandler Coventry, Obsession: works on paper and sculpture. Campbelltown City Art Gallery, 1994
- Selections from the combined Campbelltown exhibitions, titled Obsession, toured regional NSW centres.
- The Innovators: Collectors who shaped Sydney’s avant-garde 1963-1978 at S.H. Erwin Gallery in 1999.
- Coventry at New England Regional Art Museum in 2020.

== Honours, awards and distinctions ==
- In the 1980 Australia Day Honours Chandler Coventry was made a Member in the General Division of the Order of Australia for services to the grazing industry and the arts.
- Nigel Thomson's Portrait of Chandler Coventry won the 1983 Archibald Prize.
- Patron of Penrith Regional Gallery & The Lewers Bequest.
- Patron of New England Regional Art Museum.
- The S.H. Erwin Gallery honoured Coventry along with other pioneer gallerists who revolutionised Sydney's art scene in the 1960s and 1970s with an exhibition titled The Innovators: Collectors who shaped Sydney’s avant-garde 1963-1978 in 1999.
- Other artists to paint Coventry's portrait include Gunter Christmann, Geoff La Gerche and Judy Cassab. Wynne Prize winner Angus Nivison gifted his 1998 Archibald Prize finalist portrait of Chandler Coventry to NERAM.
