= Parramore (disambiguation) =

Parramore is a neighborhood in west-central Orlando, Florida, US.

Parramore may also refer to:

== Places ==
- Holden–Parramore Historic District
- Parramore Island, Accomack County, Virginia, US; a barrier island in Chesapeake Bay, see Parramore Island Natural Area Preserve
- Parramore Island Natural Area Preserve, a nature preserve on the island

== People ==
- James B. Parramore (1840–1902), Mayor of Orlando, Florida, US
- Makeba Wilbourn (born 1973, née Parramore), American psychologist
- Thomas C. Parramore (1932–2004), American historian

== Sports ==
- Handsworth Parramore F.C., the Parramore soccer team from Handsworth, Sheffield, South Yorkshire, England, UK
- Parramore Sports F.C., a soccer team from Worksop, Nottinghamshire, England, UK

== See also ==
- Parramore Springs, California, US; an unincorporated community in Lake County
- Paramour (disambiguation)
- Paramore (disambiguation)
- Paramor (disambiguation)
