= Paramor =

Paramor may refer to:

== People ==
- George Paramor (1846–1925), English cricketer
- Norrie Paramor (1913–1979), British musician
- Richard Paramor, Australian international rower, see List of Commonwealth Games medallists in rowing
- Wendy Paramor (1938–1975), Australian artist

== Arts and entertainment ==
- Mrs. Paramor, a 1923 novel written by Louis Joseph Vance
- Paramor Prize, an artistic prize established by the city of Liverpool, New South Wales, Australia in honour of Wendy Paramor

== See also ==
- Paramore (disambiguation)
- Paramour (disambiguation)
- Parramore (disambiguation)
