= Wilbourn =

Wilbourn is a surname. Notable people with the surname include:

- Claudia Wilbourn (born 1951), American bodybuilder
- George Reed Wilbourn (1922–2011), American jazz musician
- Makeba Wilbourn (born 1973), American psychologist and professor
