= Howard Hinton =

Howard Hinton may refer to:

- Howard Hinton (art patron) (1867–1948), Australian art patron and benefactor
- H. E. Hinton (Howard Everest Hinton, 1912–1977), British entomologist and fellow of the Royal Society
- Charles Howard Hinton (1853–1907), British mathematician and science fiction writer

== See also ==
- John Howard Hinton (1791–1873), English author and Baptist minister
