= 1980 Australia Day Honours =

The 1980 Australia Day Honours were announced on 26 January 1980 by the Governor General of Australia, Sir Zelman Cowen.

The Australia Day Honours are the first of the two major annual honours lists, announced on Australia Day (26 January), with the other being the Queen's Birthday Honours which are announced on the second Monday in June.

== Order of Australia ==
Order of Australia (Civil) ribbon

Order of Australia (Military) ribbon

=== Dame of the Order of Australia (AD) ===
Recipient	Citation	Notes
The Honourable Dame Enid Lyons GBE	For public and parliamentary service to Australia over many years.	

=== Companion of the Order of Australia (AC) ===
Recipient	Citation	Notes
Professor Sir Rutherford Ness Robertson CMG	For service to biological sciences	
Sir James Vernon CBE	For service to industry and to government.	

=== Officer of the Order of Australia (AO) ===
==== General Division ====
Recipient	Citation	Notes
Harold David Anderson	For public service as a diplomatic representative.	
Dr Rupert Jethro Best	For service to agricultural science.	
Charles Warren Bonython	For service to conservation	
Gavin MacRae Bunning	For service to industry and to the community.	
Dr Harold James Frith	For public service in the field of wildlife research and conservation.	
The Honourable Norman John Oswald Makin	For service to Parliament, to politics and to government.	
Lyndon Lloyd McKenzie	For public service in the aviation industry.	
Richard James Pascoe	For public service.	
Dr Sam Scruton Richardson CBE	For service to education.	
Laurence Elwyn Short OBE	For service to trade unionism.	
Kylie Tennant	For service to literature.	
John Allan Uhrig	For service to industry.	
Professor Rex Eugene Vowels	For service to education.	
Roy Mervyn Watis ISO	For public service	

==== Military Division ====
Branch	Recipient	Citation	Notes
Navy	Rear Admiral Peter Hogarth Doyle OBE	For service to the Royal Australian Navy particularly as Chief of Naval Material and as Chief of Joint Operations and Plans.	
Army	Major General David Frederick Walter Engel OBE	For service to the Australian Army, particularly as Chief of Material - Army.	
Army	Major General John Dennis Stevenson CBE	For service to the Royal Australian Navy particularly as General Officer Commanding Logistics Command.	
Air Force	Air Vice-Marshal David Archibald Stevenson Morgan OBE, QHP	For service to the Medical Branch of the Royal Australian Air Force and particularly as Director-General of Air Force Health Services.	

=== Member of the Order of Australia (AM) ===
==== General Division ====
Recipient	Citation	Notes
Pastor Paul Gerhard Ernst Albrecht	For service in the field of Aboriginal welfare.	
His Honour Judge David Ross Anderson	For service to the Royal Life Saving Society of Western Australian.	
Deaconess Mary Maria Andrews	For service to religion.	
Kenneth Alan Archer	For service to media.	
Franca Arena	For service in the field of ethic affairs.	
Violet Thenie Baddams	For service to education.	
George Kenneth Barlin	For service to the media and to the community.	
Jeffrey Allison Bennell	For service to the sport of lawn bowls	
William Martin Booth	For service to aviation.	
Dr Harold James Brown	For service to education.	
Roy Henry George Bryant	For community service, particularly in the welfare of alcoholics.	
William Patrick Calnon	For service to local government.	
Roy Angus Cameron	For service to trade unionism.	
Stanley James Cole	For community service.	
Chandler Phillip Coventry	For service to art.	
Ruth Winifred Cracknell	For service to the performing arts.	
William Leslie Carrington Davies	For service to commerce and to the media.	
Victor Allen Edgeloe	For service to education.	
Deaconess Doris Norma Farley	For service in the field of Aboriginal welfare.	
Maxwell Edgar Fatchen	For service to journalism and to literature.	
Trevor Charles Fenton	For public service in the aviation industry and for service to the arts.	
Kenneth James Fox	For service to aviation.	
Eric John Gee	For service to the dental profession.	
James Patrick Gibson	For service to trade unionism.	
Arthur Royston Griffiths	For service to trade unionism.	
Clive Frank Sutherland Groom	For service to the stevedoring industry.	
Dr Eric Rowland Guiler	For service to biological sciences	
Alexander Leonard Heilig	For public service.	
Robert Arthur Hingston	For service to local government.	
Hazel Holyman	For service to the aviation industry.	
Frederick Leslie Kerr MBE	For service in the field of fire protection, particularly as Director of the South Australian Country Fire Service	
Joan Elizabeth Kirner	For community service.	
Dorothy Isabel Knox OBE	For service to education.	
Joan Dorothy Long	For service to the film industry.	
Doris Irene Magee MBE	For service to the sport of athletics.	
Alan David McGilvray MBE	For service to the sport of cricket.	
James Gordon Menzies	For community service.	
Dr Alwyn John Millington	For service to agriculture.	
Reverend Edmund Laurence Randall	For service to religious education.	
Josephine Francis Rogers	For community service in the field of diet and nutrition.	
Honora Maud Ryan	For community service.	
John Kevin Ryan	For service to the sport of horse racing.	
Alwyn Monteith Shearer	For service to commerce and industry.	
Donald Adrian Allen Simpson	For service to handicapped children.	
Dr William Anderson Hugh Smith	For service to medicine.	
Desmond Joseph Sullivan DSO, DFC	For public service, particularly as Managing Secretary, Rottnest Island.	
Dr Eric Hyman Taft	For service to medicine, particularly in the field of dermatology.	
Robert Hunter Tait	For community service, particularly with the Boys' Brigade Australia.	
Dr Wilfred Victor Teniswood	For service to education and the community.	
Margaret Kennings Ward	For service to education.	
Dr Louis Ronald Werner	For service to education.	
Alfred Desmond Joseph Wood	For service to handicapped children.	

==== Military Division ====
Branch	Recipient	Citation	Notes
Navy	Commander Keith Martin Adams RANR	For service to the Naval Reserve Cadets.	
Navy	Commander Rudolph Raleigh Laing RAN	For service as Supply Officer in HMAS Stalwart.	
Navy	Commander Peter Clifford Mitchell RAN	For service as Assistant Director Naval Weapons Design.	
Army	Lieutenant Colonel John Stuart Baker	For service on the directing staff of the Joint Services Staff College.	
Army	Lieutenant Colonel Adrian Robert Black	For service to the Australian Army, particularly as a member of the Regular Officers Development Committee.	
Army	Lieutenant Colonel Edwin John Charlton	For service as Chief Transport and Movements Officer, 1st Transport and Movements Group.	
Army	Colonel Brian Douglas Clendinnen ED	For service to the Army Reserve, particularly as Colonel (Planning) Headquarters 3red Divisional Field Force Group.	
Army	Colonel Peter Maxwell Douglas	For service as Commander Royal Australian Corps of Transport, Headquarters Field Force Command.	
Army	Colonel Richard Seaton Flint	For service as Director of Army Training and Director of Training Requirements - Army.	
Army	Colonel Alfred Barrett Garland	For service to the Australian Army, particularly in the administration of Field Force Command.	
Air Force	Group Captain Edward James Bushell	For service as an aeronautical engineer in the Royal Australian Air Force.	
Air Force	Group Captain Langton James Connelly	For service as Director of Personnel Airmen, Royal Australian Air Force.	
Air Force	Group Captain Ian Russell Gordon	For service as Defence Adviser and Head Australian Defence Co-operation Group, Papua New Guinea.	
Air Force	Group Captain William Eric Sansum	For service as the Director of Maintenance Policy in the Royal Australian Air Force.	

=== Medal of the Order of Australia (OAM) ===
==== General Division ====
Recipient	Citation	Notes
Elaine Nancy Adler	For service in the field of children's welfare.	
Frances Mary Alvin	For community service with the Salvation Army.	
Rex Leonard Andrew	For service to the fruit growing industry.	
Charles Stuart Arnold	For service to local government and to the community.	
William Charles Arnott	For community service.	
Harold Leonard Asmith	For service to the welfare of ex-service personnel and to the community.	
William Henry John Aveling	For public service as Custodian, Admiralty House, Sydney	
Judith Anderson Baker	For community service.	
Marjorie Faith Barnard	For service to literature.	
Vera Florence Barnes	For community service.	
Alexander John Barter	For service to the sport of archery.	
Nancy Evelyn Beaney	For community service.	
Douglas Frank Bennetts	For community service.	
Thomas John Bennison	For service to the sport of sailing.	
Marion Maria Bishop	For community service.	
George Edward Bowden	For public service.	
Malcolm Russell Bromell	For community service.	
Kenneth Symington Brown	For service to education.	
Raymond Clarence Bruce	For community service.	
Brigadier Claude Ewen Cameron MC, ED	For service to the community and to the welfare of ex-service personnel.	
Veronica Jill Campbell	For public service, particularly at the Australian Embassy, Tehran.	
Jessie Madeline Clyde	For community service.	
Colin Cecil Coleman	For public and community service, particularly in relation to the Australian Army Apprentices School, Balcombe, Victoria.	
Carmel Mary Croan	For community service.	
James William Culley	For service to the sport of cycling.	
Rowland Stanley James Dart	For service to the Scout Association of Australia	
Merle Lorraine Davies	For community service.	
John William Dixon	For public service.	
Teresa Ada Dixon	For public service.	
Leonard Joseph Edgar	For public service in the aviation industry.	
William Middleton Ellings	For community service.	
Thomas Sydney Ellis	For community service.	
Bobbie Ellen Fenner ARRC	For community service.	
Millicent Olive Vera Fernance	For community service.	
Zora Ruby May Fibbins	For service to athletics and the sport of hockey.	
Henry Fowler	For community service.	
Henry Alan Flower	For public service.	
Alleyn Albert Gainsford	For community service.	
Charles Alexander Gardner	For community service.	
Charles Owen Geddes	For community service.	
Clive Francis Geddes	For service to the sport of rugby league football.	
Dulcie Edna Gifford	For community service.	
Gloria Anne Goolagong	For community service, particularly the welfare of Aboriginal children.	
Diana Rose Graham	For community service.	
John Goldney Heylen Green	For service to local government and to the community.	
Amy Lillian Griffith	For community service.	
Janis Gulbis	For service in the field of migrant welfare.	
Patricia Halpen	For service to music.	
Maxwell Roy Harvey	For community service.	
Kathleen Mavis Hay	For service to nursing.	
Charles Gordon Hill	For service to the sport of Australian football.	
Donovan Wheatley Hill	For community service.	
Leonard Hockley	For public service and for service to the community.	
Jack Douglas Hurley	For community service.	
Leonora Oakley Hurrell	For service to the community, particularly as Postmistress at Sheringa, South Australia.	
Clarence Frank Johnson	For service to local government and to the community.	
Albert Reginald Kelly	For service to the community.	
Heinrich Edgar Kruger	For service to the welfare of ex-service personnel.	
Lazarus Liveris	For public service and for service to the community.	
Walter Michael Loth	For service to local government and to the community.	
James Douglas Macfarlane	For service to horticulture.	
Margaret John Mackie	For community service.	
Dorothy Amelia Mackinnon	For community service.	
Charles Ernest Marden	For public service.	
Robert James Percival Marshall	For service to the sport of billiards and to the community.	
Edward William McBride	For service to the sport of wood chopping.	
Frances Patricia McCann	For service to the sport of softball.	
Allan John McDonald	For service to the welfare of ex-service personnel and to the community.	
Basil Vernon McDonald	For service to the sport of life saving.	
Bruce Frederick McIntosh	For service to local government and to the community.	
James Gordin McIntosh	For service to the sport of rifle shooting.	
Alison McMullen	For community service.	
Betty Ann Michelmore	For community service.	
Ellen Mary Mitchell	For service to children's welfare.	
Patricia Mary Mitchell	For community service.	
John Alexander Morgan	For community service.	
Gene Lorelle Moore	For service to the welfare of children of ex-service personnel.	
Denis Royston James Morrissey	For service to local government and to the community.	
Dr Noel Andrew Needham	For service to the Scouts Association of Australia.	
Major William Barr Nehl ED RAA (Retired)	For service to the welfare of ex-service personnel.	
Eva May Nettle	For community service.	
Margaret Ruth Newnham	For service to aged persons' welfare.	
Colin Stanislaus Newton	For service to local government and to the community.	
John William Noakes	For public service.	
John Johnson Nyland	For service to trade unionism.	
Henry James O'Callaghan	For service to the sport of Australian football.	
James O'Dea	For service to music.	
Allan Forrest Pankhurst	For service to local government.	
Maria Maddalena Pascoli	For community service.	
George Edward Petersen	For community service.	
Thomas Hugh Phillips	For community service.	
Peter Polacik	For service in the field of migrant welfare.	
Edward Quong	For community service.	
Frances Lionel Rankin	For public service.	
Edward Leslie Joseph Reardon	For service to local government and to the community.	
Ethel May Redman	For community service.	
Adrian Gerard Roche	For community service.	
Wladsyslaw Rogowski	For service to migrant welfare.	
Sergeant First Grade Lionel Edgar Samuels	For public service.	
Lionel Robson Shearer	For service to local government and to the community.	
Joy Bethel Smith	For community service.	
Henry William Percy Smith	For service to junior sport.	
Marjorie Hilda Spurling	For community service.	
Gordon John Willy Suhr	For community service, particularly as a volunteer fire fighter.	
Kenneth George Steward	For service to the sport of athletics.	
Lieutenant Commander William Noel Swan RAN (Retired)	For community service	
Agnes Vera Mabel Synan	For community service	
Marian Olga Tarling	For service in the aviation industry, particularly as an Air Traffic Controller.	
Gloria Maude Tate	For service to education.	
Betty Christine Teltscher	For community service, particularly with the Australian Huntington's Disease Association.	
Jenkin Newton Thomas	For service to the sport of clay target shooting.	
Detective Chief Superintendent Kenneth Lawrence Thorsen	For public service.	
John Vandeloo	For community service	
Frederick Herbert Walker	For public service.	
Joan Muriel Walton	For community service.	
Hettie Elizabeth Matilda Ward	For community service.	
Rhonda Hearnshaw Watson	For community service.	
Percy George Wallace Whitelaw	For service to the welfare of ex-service personnel.	
Helen Helga Wilson	For service to literature.	
William Austin Woodger	For service to the sport of rugby union.	
Victor Albert Woolcock	For service to the welfare of ex-service personnel.	
William Leonard Wright	For community service.	

==== Military Division ====
Branch	Recipient	Citation	Notes
Navy	Warrant Officer Norbert Hans Friebe	For service in HMAS Supply.	
Navy	Warrant Officer Francis Alan Gibbs	For service during the refitting of HMA Submarines Oxley and Onslow	
Army	Warrant Officer Class One Hilton Robert Atkins	For service to the Royal Australian Electrical and Mechanical Engineers.	
Army	Warrant Officer Class One Arthur John Bretherton	For service as the Regimental Sergeant Major of the Royal Military College, Duntroon.	
Army	Warrant Officer Class Two Donald Keith Morgan	For service to the Army Reserve.	
Army	Warrant Officer Class One Gerald Ivan Neagle	For service to the Army Reserve, particularly as Regimental Sergeant Major, 4th Training Group.	
Army	Warrant Officer Class One John Neil Sheehan	For service to the Special Air Service Regiment and to the Infantry Corps.	
Air Force	Warrant Officer Christopher James Bohr	For service as a Warrant Officer Engineer at Number 3 Aircraft Depot, Royal Australian Air Force.	
Air Force	Warrant Officer Henry James Burke	For service to the Defence and Fire Section of Operations Branch, Headquarters Support Command, Royal Australian Air Force.	
Air Force	Warrant Officer Neville Gannaway	For service as an accounting clerk, RAAF Base, Edinburgh, South Australia.	
Air Force	Warrant Officer Mervyn Charles Pinner	For service with Number 24 (City of Adelaide) (Auxiliary) Squadron, Royal Australian Air Force.	
