= Paramore (disambiguation) =

Paramore is an American rock band.

Paramore may also refer to:

== People ==
- Jim Paramore (born 1939, as James Paramore) U.S. American football player, coach, official
- Junior Paramore (born 1968, as Peter Paramore) Samoan rugby union player

== Other ==
- Paramore (album), a 2013 album by the eponymous band

== See also ==
- Paramor (disambiguation)
- Paramour (disambiguation)
- Parramore (disambiguation)
