= Doris Magee =

Australian sprinter

Doris Irene Magee AM, MBE (née Lee, 21 February 1907 – 4 July 2002) was an Australian sprinter and sports administrator.

Magee campaigned for gender equality in athletics by advocating for the inclusion of women in Australia's Olympic and British Empire teams.

== Competing ==
Magee competed as a sprinter throughout the late 1920s and early 1930s for local Sydney clubs City Girls and Randwick Kensington, with moderate success.

== Administration ==
After serving as honorary secretary of the women's section of the Randwick-Kensington Athletics Club, Magee's administrative career in Australian athletics began in earnest in May 1931 when her nomination for the position as honorary assistant secretary for the New South Wales Amateur Athletics Association was accepted, and she became the organisation's first female executive officer. Despite her appointment, Magee received different treatment from her male counterparts, such as when she was requested to leave a meeting held in August 1931 while charges against a Sydney athlete were read out because the allegations included the use of insulting language.

Magee went onto become general secretary of the Australian Women's Amateur Athletics Union in 1932. She was also a founding member of the New South Wales Women's Amateur Athletics Union, becoming that organisation's first honorary secretary before being appointed president in 1959.

During her career, Magee relentlessly campaigned to have the gender imbalance of Australian track and field athletes in major sporting events equalised. She objected to the omission of Clarice Kennedy from the 1936 Summer Olympics. When she was appointed as manageress of the women's track and field team for the 1938 British Empire Games held in Australia, she challenged the policy of only selecting seven women due to financial constraints, despite the depth of female talent within Australian athletics. The quota was raised to 15 when Magee took full responsibility for the women.

Magee acted as chaperone for the female Australian athletes who travelled to London for the 1948 Summer Olympics.

In 1952, Magee took issue with the low rankings given to the women's relay team vying for a spot in the 1952 Summer Olympics, which would have meant the team (consisting of Marjorie Jackson, Shirley Strickland, Verna Johnston and Winsome Cripps) would have been omitted from the Australian team. Magee said she was again willing to organise a door-to-door campaign to seek the necessary funds to send the athletes, similar to what she had done prior to the 1948 Olympics. Magee openly criticised the lack of consideration of female athletes who had already proven their worth at the 1948 Olympics, describing it as "galling" and "bitterly disappointing". After various fundraising efforts, Magee said she was confident they had raised enough money to send the athletes, including the Australian relay team, to Helsinki.

Magee was appointed to the International Association of Athletics Federations Women's Committee in 1952.

The promotion of women's sport in Australia increased when Magee began writing her own weekly newspaper column in the 1950s called "Women in Sport" for The Sunday Herald.

== Honours ==
As part of the Queen's Birthday Honours in 1956, Magee was appointed as a Member of the Order of the British Empire for her services to women's athletics and to social welfare.

In 1972, Magee received the IAAF Veteran's Pin.

As part of the 1980 Australia Day Honours, Magee was made a Member of the Order of Australia for her service to the sport of athletics.

== Death ==
Magee died at the War Veterans Nursing Home in Narrabeen on 4 July 2002. A funeral service was held on 11 July and a memorial service was held on 24 July.
