= Nora Heysen =

Australian artist (1911–2003)

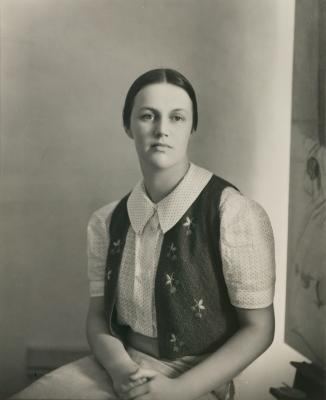
- Photograph of Heysen by Harold Cazneaux, 1939, Sydney
- Born: 11 January 1911; Hahndorf, South Australia
- Died: 30 December 2003 (aged 92); Sydney, Australia
- Education: School of Fine Arts, Adelaide; Julian Ashton Art School, Sydney
- Alma mater: Central School of Art and Design, London
- Known for: First woman Australian war artist First woman to win the Archibald Prize
- Notable work: Madame Elink Schuurman 1938
- Spouse: Dr. Robert Black
- Awards: Member of the Order of Australia; Melrose Prize for Portraiture; Archibald Prize; Australia Council Award for Achievement in the Arts

Nora Heysen, AM (11 January 1911 – 30 December 2003) was an Australian artist, the first woman to win the Archibald Prize in 1938 for portraiture and the first Australian woman appointed as an official war artist.

== Early years ==
Nora Heysen was born on 11 January 1911 in Hahndorf, South Australia, Australia, as the fourth child of landscape painter Hans Heysen and his wife Selma Heysen (née Bartels). She and was raised at The Cedars in Hahndorf in the Adelaide Hills. Heysen and her siblings were taught painting at home by the artist and teacher Mary Anstie Overbury. Heysen was the most artistically talented of her siblings and her parents encouraged her to drew and paint. She studied art from 1926 to 1930 at the School of Fine Arts in Adelaide under F. Millward Grey. Nora Heysen sold paintings to the Art Gallery of New South Wales and the Art Gallery of South Australia in 1930. From 1930 to 1933, she continued to study two days a week at the school, and worked in her own studio the rest of the time. In 1931 she visited Sydney with her parents, and spent two weeks studying at the Julian Ashton Art School.

== Early career ==
In 1930, Heysen produced 24 pen, ink and wash drawings to illustrate a collection of legends by Katie Langloh Parker, titled Woggheeguy.

Heysen's first solo exhibition was held in Sydney in 1933. In 1934 she travelled to London with her family, remaining in Europe after they returned home, until 1937 studying and painting at the Central School of Art and Design under Bernard Meninsky. She funded her studies in England with the proceeds of the solo exhibition in Sydney.

Heysen missed her family while living in England, so invited her friend Everton Stokes (Evie), a sculpture student, to share her London flat. She painted Evie while they were living together. Heysen also wrote letters to her father about her studies and paintings she observed while visiting the National Gallery, National Portrait Gallery and Tate.

When Heysen returned to Australia, she returned briefly to Adelaide and then moved to Sydney.

== Archibald Prize ==
In 1938, Heysen entered two portraits in the Archibald Prize. Her portrait of Madame Elink Schuurman was awarded the prize and she became the first woman to win the Archibald. There was a controversy involving criticism of her win by painter Max Meldrum.

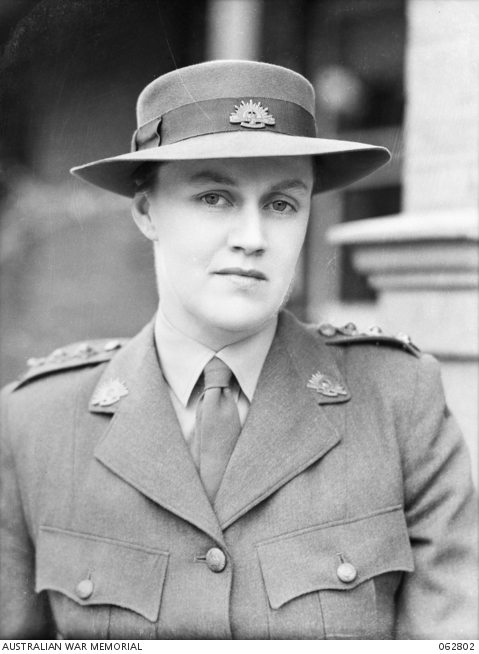
Captain Nora Heysen on 17 January 1944

== War artist ==
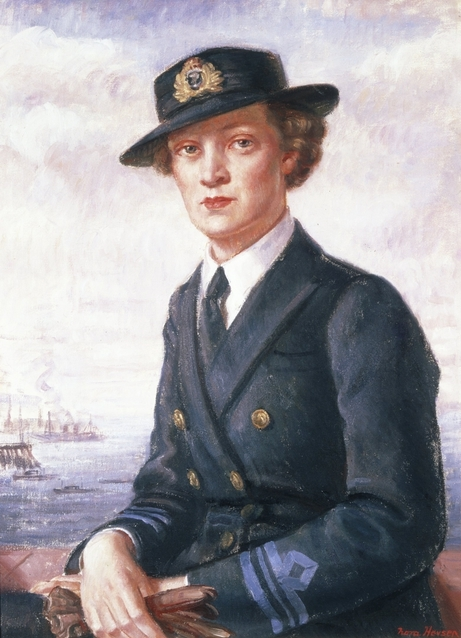
Heysen's 1943 painting of Sheila McClemans

On 12 October 1943, Heysen became the first woman to be appointed as an Australian war artist, being granted the honorary rank of captain. As Heysen said in a later interview about her role: "I was commissioned to depict the women's war effort. There was that restriction on what I did. So I was lent around to all the services, the air force, the navy and the army, to depict the women working at everything they did during the war".

During her service Heysen completed over 170 works of art. She was discharged from service in 1946 in New Guinea, where she had been stationed from April 1944.

== Family life and death ==
Following her discharge from war service, Heysen went to London and later returned to Sydney in 1948. While in New Guinea, she met Dr. Robert Black, whom she married in 1953. She continued to paint, exhibit and travel with her husband. Her marriage ended in 1972.

Heysen died in Sydney on 30 December 2003.

== Reception ==
A 1939 article in The Australian Women's Weekly ran with the headline "Girl Painter Who Won Art Prize is also Good Cook", and lists three of Heysen's favourite recipes along with her strategies for achieving domestic duties and leaving time for painting.

Heysen's works are currently held in the collections of the National Gallery of Australia, the Australian War Memorial, the National Library of Australia, the National Portrait Gallery and several state galleries.

A major retrospective exhibition of the work of daughter and father, Hans and Nora Heysen: Two Generations of Australian Art, was curated by the National Gallery of Victoria and displayed from March–July 2019. Reviewing it, Sydney Morning Herald critic John McDonald described Nora's career as a "fractured, stop-start affair", but that in a "popular rethinking of the Heysen's place in local art history ... Nora's star has risen while her father's has declined."

McDonald nominated as Nora's signature work her "breathtaking still life, Eggs (1927)" from the Hinton collection in the New England Regional Art Museum, and described her Still Life of quinces (1933) from the same collection as "painted with the precision of an old master."

== Awards ==
In 1993 Heysen was awarded the Australia Council's Award for Achievement in the Arts and on 26 January 1998 she was appointed a Member of the Order of Australia for her service to art.

- 1933: Melrose Prize for Portraiture
- 1938: Archibald Prize for her portrait of Adine Michele Elink Schuurman
- 1993: Australia Council Award for Achievement in the Arts
- 1998: Member of the Order of Australia
- 2001: Victorian Honour Roll of Women

== Notes ==
Awards
Preceded by Normand Baker	Archibald Prize; 1938 for Mme. Elink Schuurman	Succeeded by Max Meldrum
