= Ken Archer =

Australian cricketer (1928–2023)

Ken Archer AM
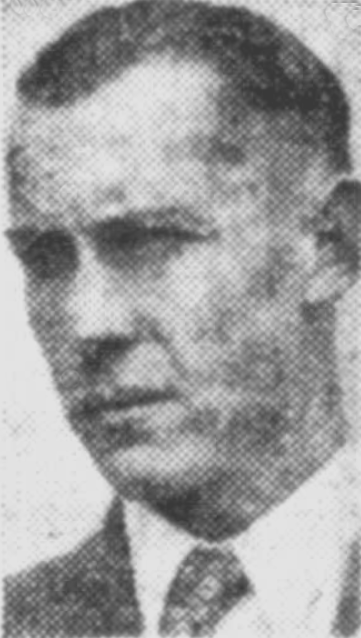

Personal information
- Full name: Kenneth Alan Archer
- Born: 17 January 1928; Yeerongpilly, Queensland, Australia
- Died: 14 April 2023 (aged 95)
- Batting: Right-handed
- Bowling: Right-arm offbreak
- Relatives: Ron Archer (brother)

International information
- National side: Australia (1950–1951)
- Test debut (cap 186): 22 December 1950 v England
- Last Test: 30 November 1951 v West Indies

Domestic team information
- Years: Team
- 1946/47–1956/57: Queensland

Career statistics
| Competition | Test | First-class |
|---|---|---|
| Matches | 5 | 82 |
| Runs scored | 234 | 3,774 |
| Batting average | 26.00 | 29.95 |
| 100s/50s | 0/0 | 3/25 |
| Top score | 48 | 134 |
| Balls bowled | – | 1,500 |
| Wickets | – | 13 |
| Bowling average | – | 53.69 |
| 5 wickets in innings | – | 0 |
| 10 wickets in match | – | 0 |
| Best bowling | – | 2/16 |
| Catches/stumpings | 0/– | 56/1 |
- Source: CricketArchive, 18 December 2017

Kenneth Alan Archer AM (17 January 1928 – 14 April 2023) was an Australian cricketer and broadcaster. He was educated at the Anglican Church Grammar School. An opening batsman, he played domestic first-class cricket for Queensland for ten years, from 1946–7 to 1956–7. He played in five Tests for the Australian cricket team in 1950 and 1951. His younger brother Ron Archer played 19 Tests for Australia between 1953 and 1956.

Archer toured to South Africa in 1949-50, but was not selected for the Test team. He made his Test debut in the second test (after a 6th consecutive 12th man pick) of the 1950–51 Ashes series against England at the Melbourne Cricket Ground. Despite moderate scores in that match, and the third test at the Sydney Cricket Ground and the fourth test at the Adelaide Oval, he was then dropped from the team. He returned for the first two tests against West Indies in 1951-2, but did not play Test cricket again.

Archer initially worked as a science teacher during his playing career, but switched to broadcasting in 1954 when he was recruited by Bob Hynes for the Brisbane radio station 4BC. He later became Hynes's right-hand man in the Commonwealth Broadcasting Corporation and succeeded him as its chief executive. In the 1980 Australia Day Honours, Archer was appointed a Member of the Order of Australia (AM) in recognition of services to the media. On 14 July 2000, Archer was awarded the Australian Sports Medal for his cricketing achievements.

Following the death of Len Maddocks in September 2016, Archer became Australia's oldest living male Test cricketer. Archer died of heart failure on 14 April 2023, at the age of 95.
