= Paramour =

Paramour may refer to:

- The Righteous Brothers formerly named The Paramours, an American musical duo
- Paramour (Cirque du Soleil), a Broadway musical theatre residency show
- Paramour Mansion, Los Angeles, California, US, a historic mansion
- Paramour Rupes, a ridge on the planet Mercury
- HMS Paramour, a British Royal Navy ship

== See also ==
- Paramour rights, rights of a slaveowner in the sexual use of their slaves
- The Paramour Sessions, a 2006 album by Papa Roach
- Paramor (disambiguation)
- Paramore (disambiguation)
- Parramore (disambiguation)
