= Armidale Teachers' College =

Armidale Teacher's College, Armidale
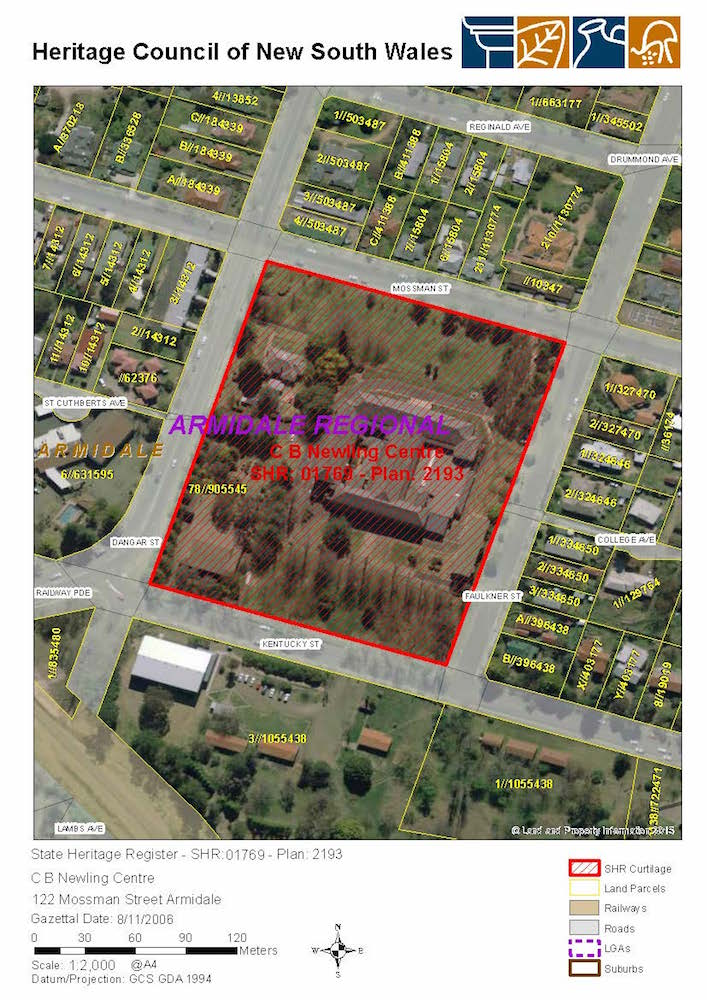
- Heritage boundaries

- Location within New South Wales Location within Australia
- 30.5228°S 151.6626°E
- Location: 122–132 Mossman Street, Armidale, Armidale Regional Council, New South Wales, Australia

History
- Built: 1928–1931

Site notes
- Architect(s): Chief Architect; Mr Sparkes. Original sketch plans were submitted by J. Dawson; Acting Architect
- Owner: University of New England

New South Wales Heritage Register
- Official name: C B Newling Centre; Armidale Teachers College; Old Teachers College; Armidale Advanced College of Education
- Type: state heritage (complex / group)
- Designated: 8 November 2006
- Reference no.: 1769
- Type: Tertiary College
- Category: Education
- Builders: NSW Public Works Department, supervised by Mr Tolhurst, Supervising Architect for Armidale

The Armidale Teachers' College is a heritage-listed former tertiary college at 122–132 Mossman Street, Armidale in the New England region of New South Wales, Australia. It was designed by the New South Wales Government Architect and built from 1928 to 1931 by the NSW Public Works Department. The property is owned by the Government of New South Wales, and currently managed by NSW Crown Lands pending a permanent manager. It was added to the New South Wales State Heritage Register on 8 November 2006.

== History ==
=== Armidale Gaol ===
In July 1859 the Armidale jail was proclaimed, in the following year a tender was called for the construction and the facility received its first prisoners in 1863. The jail served the northern tablelands as the major prison until it was disestablished in 1920. The jail was allowed to fall into disrepair until the mid-1920s when the Government examined the possibility of housing sexual offenders in the facilities. This led to panic amongst nearby landholders, many of whom sold their properties. Nothing became of the plan and the jail was still disused in 1927 when the site for the new teachers' college was selected. David H. Drummond, minister for education, was determined to remove all evidence of the jail before the teachers' college was constructed, wanting no association between the two, and on 10 February 1928 it was decided to demolish the building. The jail was demolished in 1929 and the bricks were used in the foundations of the new college building, thus inadvertently retaining a physical association, despite Drummond's intentions.

=== Armidale Teachers' College ===
The political factors leading to the construction of the college illustrates the complex role of government and administration. The first steps in establishing a teachers' college in Armidale commenced when David Drummond, then the Progressive Party's member for the Northern Tablelands, arranged for a delegation to meet with the minister of public instruction, to put forward a proposition concerning a university college in Armidale. The government was resistant to the decentralisation of services and unwilling to spend money on a new teacher's college.

In October 1927, a NSW Coalition State Government was formed between the Nationalists and Country Party (formerly the Progressive Party) and David Drummond became Minister for Education on 18 October 1927. This partnership gave the Country Party enough power, for the first time, to spend money on country areas. Official approval for construction of an Armidale teachers' college was given at a meeting of the NSW State Cabinet on 13 December 1927 and on 30 December the establishment of the college was officially announced.

David Henry Drummond was born in Sydney in 1890 and, after a period of time as a ward of the State, he became a farm labourer in 1907 and then moved to Inverell as a farm manager. It was in Inverell that he became active in the Farmers and Settler's Association. This Association had pushed for improved country education facilities since 1895.

The membership of the Farmers and Settler's Association, his lack of education and his support for public education informed Drummond's views. The Queensland Northern Separation Movement, campaigning for improved education in the region north, was a further influence. Agitation by the New England New State Movement had led to the formation of the Cohen Commission into the New States in 1923/4. Some of the commission's recommendations included the creation of a country teachers' college, an external teaching university and greater local influence in education. Drummond was particularly influenced by evidence from William Holman, who stated "before you can have decentralisation you must first teach the teachers". Historian Belshaw believes that it was probably Drummond, drawing inspiration from the commission, who coined the phrase "A Country College for Country Kids" and certainly used it effectively. It was Drummond who influenced the concept of country teachers' colleges and universities, written into the policy speech and presented at West Wyalong on 13 September 1927 by Country Party Leader, Ernest Buttenshaw. Drummond's appointment as Minister for Education in the first National-Country Party coalition was therefore not surprising. The college's establishment within five months of the election bears testimony to the power of the Northern interest groups and Drummond's ministerial influence. The main interest group influencing the site of the teachers' college was the New State Movement, of which Drummond was a founding member.

The New State Movement (NSM) was, as Elphick (1989, p. 11) explains it, "a political expression of the emotional belief held in the country areas that "N.S.W." stood for "Newcastle, Sydney and Wollongong," and that the way to beat the power of the metropolitan areas was to separate from the parent state." The NSM never had enough power on its own to achieve its political goals, rather it relied on members being elected under the auspices of other political parties, mainly the Country Party, and furthering their goals through that party. Drummond was an executive foundation member of NSM, along with the Federal Member for Cowper, Sir Earle Page. Drummond and Page conferred on a number of projects to improve services and infrastructure in the region.

Drummond was keen to get the college operational as quickly as possible and thereby advance his New State agenda. Drummond saw the establishment of a teachers' college as the first step in the eventual creation of a University, a necessary piece of infrastructure for the New State to have. He was in office only five months before announcing the establishment of the college on 30 December 1927. Sydney Teachers' College was overcrowded and was unable to meet the demand for trained teachers. Drummond used this to his advantage, rushing the decisions through the political process.

Christmas delayed the appointment of the principal, Cecil Bede (C.B.) Newling, after whom the centre was later named, until 13 January 1928. Newling was a well-respected principal, students called him "Pop" and ex-students kept in contact with him, sending the letters telling of their exploits since leaving college. Today these letters are housed in the Heritage Centre, University of New England Archives.

Despite Drummond's haste, he did not want the college to be seen as the second rate and wanted to ensure that country students were given the same opportunities and facilities as those in Sydney. He was determined that the teachers' college should be a first-class training institution. In a Parliamentary debate on 5 December 1930, he said: "my policy in regard to the Armidale Teachers" College was that no student who passed through it should have any fear of reproach on the ground that it was a college less developed than the great Sydney Teachers' College'. Drummond rejected the government architect's suggestion that the extant jail is modified for use as a college and refused to stand down until demolition of the building was approved. He did allow some of the bricks to be reused, for a saving of 8000 pounds, so long as they were used out of sight – either in the footings or rendered. To save on time, Drummond instructed the Government Architect to base the plans for the college on the Sydney Teachers College (1925), altering them where necessary to take into account local conditions and experience with the Sydney building.

Construction began in 1928 and Drummond kept a close eye on the progress. He made several changes to the plans during the construction including authorising additional funds to slate the roof, rather than galvanised iron and to decorate the interior. As part of his commitment to providing the best possible facilities, the Gymnasium was designed with special care and professional advice. Colonel Alderson of Victoria Barracks in Melbourne was called in as an adviser. The Duntroon Military College Gymnasium, considered the best of its type at the time was the model on which the Armidale unit was based. Among other features, it was fitted with a specially mounted floor on elliptical springs to cushion impacts.

The first intake of students arrived in 1928 and lessons were held in a two-roomed weatherboard cottage known as "Siberia". Half of the college was ready for the class of 1930 and the building was fully completed in 1931. Drummond came under increasing and significant pressure regarding the funds spent on the college, given the economic depression. Even his local constituents, who had been happy to accept the building contacts, grumbled about the waste of money. Possibly as a consequence, there was no opening ceremony for the building, although two had been held during the centre's construction, one to mark the laying of the foundation stone and the other an Inaugural Ceremony to mark the first intake of student teachers.

The theme of celebration, however, dominates the history of the college. The first Easter Reunion was introduced in 1932, during the Great Depression. Officially and unofficially, it lasted for generations. No student was allowed to go home for Easter because the Reunion was regarded as an official function. Students from throughout New South Wales returned usually by train to their alma mater.

The teachers' college sought free plants from Canberra's Yarralumla Nursery in 1934 – applying for trees for their then-bare grounds. They were unsuccessful. The Yarralumla Nursery started a free plant scheme under Thomas Weston which grew from its local neighbourhood to the entire nation in the 1920s, often supplying members of Parliament. These often gave the plants to their electorates across Australia.

The tragic events of World War II dominated the life of the college. The students enlisted numbered 570, along with five lecturers and two gardeners. Of these, 68 students and two lecturers were killed. Deaths of students and staff members were acknowledged at college formal assemblies, parents of those college servicemen and women were invited to attend the Memorial Services dedicated to remembering those who had fallen. For parents who could not attend, the assemblies were sometimes broadcast on 2UD radio. The Friday Assembly became a regular feature of college life during the war and was refined as the casualty lists grew and more students were killed. During the War, plans were made for appropriate memorials. It was at the 1946 Easter Reunion that the first volume of the Book of Remembrance was unveiled. The second permanent memorial, gates at the main entrance to the college from Mossman Street, were unveiled by C. B. Newling at the 1949 Easter Celebrations, held on the 15 April. A memorial rosemary hedge is situated at the top of the main driveway leading from the memorial gates. Other memorials include a timber war service Honour Roll, unveiled in 2003.

The college was also used as a repository for the storing of works of art and artefacts during the height of the war. It was only after the war ended that Principal Newling informed the college deputy principal, the Armidale and NSW communities that treasures from the Mitchell Library and the National Art Gallery of New South Wales were stored in the college basement.

The college had an unusual involvement in World War Two. Under the leadership of manual arts lecturer H. W. Oxford, a group of college men won national fame making model aeroplanes for training the armed forces in the recognition of hostile aircraft. As a result of requests from the War Effort Coordination Committee, Oxford was released from duty at the college in May 1942 to manufacture a total of 1080 planes for the war effort.

The establishment of the college is also associated with innovations in teaching methods. S. H. Smith, Director of Education and Principal C. B. Newling pioneered a new approach to teacher training – an approach that emphasised the practicalities of teaching rather than emphasising "academic knowledge as a substitute for teaching skills". Smith proclaimed this new policy at the inaugural ceremony of the college on 9 March 1928 when he stated: "Principal Newling and his staff will lay special emphasis on" the Primary School Syllabus "in the scheme and purpose of education".

=== Armidale College of Advanced Education ===
In 1971 the institution changed from a teachers' college to a College of Advanced Education. Around this time the college began running short courses. From this, the institution moved from solely teacher training to offering wider Adult Education courses, particularly in the areas of Nurse Education, Aboriginal Education and Post Graduate Education. In close association with the University of New England and the development of the Advanced Education movement, courses were offered by distance education.

Between 1982 and 1984 the western quadrangle was built-in with the Aboriginal Studies Centre. The Armidale C.A.E. was a pioneer in Aboriginal Education. Ruth Lovelock, a student in the inaugural 1984 intake of the Associate Diploma in Aboriginal Studies writes: "With an awareness of the issues confronting the Aboriginal students and an appreciation of the vital need to overcome the entrenched stereotype, Armidale CAE has contributed a great deal to improvements in Aboriginal education".

By the 1980s, Armidale College of Advanced Education had moved from a college for NSW country students to having a wider student base. Metropolitan Sydney provided over 30% of students in 1986 and interstate students accounted for another 30%. Special programs brought the students and lecturers from Fiji, Vanuatu and the Solomon Islands to the college.

Despite some opposition from the colleges of nursing, the Armidale College of Advanced Education met the challenge to provide external courses for nurses. These courses became some of the most numerically and developmentally important run by the college. The college won the respect of nurses, particularly those who worked in isolated country centres and vindication of college planning was revealed in 1980 enrolments; of the 1094 external students, 412 were nursing students.

In 1988 the Armidale College of Advanced Education was amalgamated with the Northern Rivers College of Advanced Education and the University of New England. In the following year, the college ceased to exist as an autonomous unit. During its time as part of the University of New England, it was known as the C. B. Newling Centre or Campus. In 1996 the university announced it planned to mothball the building, but continued to act as corporate trust manager of the site.

=== C. B. Newling Centre of the University of New England ===
Community support for the college is demonstrated by the formation of Friends of the Old Teachers' College (F.O.T.C.) upon the decision. Established on 28 April 1997, the F.O.T.C. worked towards a Memorandum of Understanding with the University of New England and the Armidale City Council to save the building and work towards improving its interior. Between 1998 and 2005 F.O.T.C. have received a number of Heritage Office grants to undertake this work. The Centre subsequently housed the New England Heritage Centre, opened in 1976, as well as being available for community events. Annual re-unions still occur in Armidale as students return to visit the college and some still stay in the former student residential college, S.H. Smith House. On a number of occasions, these former students have published their memories in publications and planted trees in memory of former teaching colleagues.

In 2004 the New England Conservatorium of Music (NECOM) became the principal tenant of the old Armidale Teacher's College building. NECOM provides extensive music education and performance programs to pre-school, Kindergarten to Year 12 students, schools and teachers, as well as services to community musicians and organisations, and private music teachers through its Music Educator Member Program.

Information emerged in the 21st century about the discovery of Aboriginal remains on the site during the demolition of the Armidale Gaol in 1929. At the time, the remains were removed to the University of Sydney and held for many years. In 2011, contact was made between the Armidale Local Aboriginal Land Council and the University of New England to negotiate the repatriation of the remains to the CB Newling campus of the university.

In February 2017, the University of New England announced that it would no longer manage the Old Teachers' College on the basis that it no longer used the site and was costing the university around $500,000 a year. The NSW Department of Industry – Lands took over responsibility until a suitable manager could be found. UNE's decision was criticised by local MP Adam Marshall, with the state government having not been informed in advance of the move. Existing tenants, including the New England Conservatorium of Music, were able to continue in the building. The department approached the Armidale Regional Council to take over management of the site, but the council refused on the basis that the costs of repairs and maintenance would be too high. The council administrators had earlier suggested that if UNE had informed them six months earlier, they may have been able to relocate the local library there. The Armidale School also refused to take over as manager.

In February 2018, the New England Regional Art Museum established a permanent exhibit of selections from the more-than-1,000 Howard Hinton artworks that had been transferred from the Old Teachers' College. A conservator told the Armidale Express that the artworks had been kept in "less than ideal conditions", and that "they'd be bumped or dusty or in the sun".

In April 2018, the New England Conservatorium of Music opened up the secret passageways under the building which had been used to protect art during World War II for the first time. The conservatorium's director stated that he was "shocked" at the public response, having expected "little over a dozen" people and instead having more than 160 bookings.

Workers emptied the parts of the building formerly occupied by UNE in May 2018, removing old prints, paintings, negatives, historical university records, convict charge books dating back to the 1800s, old musical items and drama props amongst other things. It was reported at that time that the building's fate still remained uncertain.

=== Department of Regional NSW ===
In January 2021, it was announced that the C.B. Newling building (Old Teacher's College) would become one of four new hubs of the Department of Regional NSW. It will house up to 100 new jobs in the New England region.

=== Important dates ===
- 1919 Howard Hinton (1867–1948), future art benefactor of the college, became a Trustee of the National Art Gallery of N.S.W.
- 1928 January Cecil Bede Newling's appointment as Principal of the college.
- 1928 January 30 Tenders called for the construction of the college building.
- 1929 April First sod on the site is turned and construction of the college building began.
- 1929 November 2 Laying of two foundation stones by the Premier of NSW, T.R. Bavin and the Minister for Education, D.H. Drummond.
- 1929 September Contract for the main college building completed.
- 1929 November Approval granted to install a metal book stack with glazed floor and heavy fireproof doors.
- 1929 November 25 Howard Hinton begins donations of works of art to the college. Between 1929 and 1948, he gave over 1,000 works of art to the college.
- 1930 Fred Dye appointed college gardener (retired 1954).
- 1933 Rose gardens instigated.
- 1935 Stained glass window dedicated to "Wisdom" by Norman Carter presented by Howard Hinton.
- 1937 Stained glass window dedicated to "Sport" by Norman Carter presented by Howard Hinton.
- 1947 Planning commenced for the Memorial Gardens.
- 1949 April 15 Memorial gates officially opened. The iron gates were made by the Cyclone Company, the ironwork was fashioned by J.S. Naylor of Armidale, and the granite posts by Vic Melvaine of Uralla. An Armidale builder, Frank Nott was in charge of construction. At the same time, the first volume of the Book of Remembrance was unveiled.
- 1954 Retirement of Frederick T. Dye, Gardener of the college. His achievement is noted in the inscription of the memorial pool set amongst the roses at the front of the college: "This pool is in memory of Frederick T. Dye, Head Gardener of the College, 1930–1954, who first created the beauty you see around you".
- 1955 February Ned McCann became the Head Gardener.
- 1971 September Armidale Teachers' College became a College of Advanced Education.
- 1974 December The college was incorporated under the Higher Education Act.
- 1976 February Opening of the New England Historical Resources Centre by Dr W.J.A. Vaughan, Director of Studies.
- 1976 October Opening of the New England Educational Diagnostic Centre in the former Principal's Residence.
- 1977 College Union facilities opened on the ground floor of the west wing.
- 1978 New stairs to replace the central southern stairs constructed.
- 1982 Northern part of the Aboriginal Studies Centre constructed in the western quadrangle.
- 1983 The southern part of the Aboriginal Studies Centre constructed in the southern quadrangle.
- 1983 New England Regional Art Museum opened on the Newling-Moran Reserve, the former playing fields of the Armidale Teachers College managed as NSW Crown Lands.
- 1984 March 31 Senator Susan Ryan, Senator for Education and Youth Affairs officially opened the Aboriginal Studies Resource Centre.
- 1987 Sketch plans prepared for completion of the East Wing.
- 1988 Amalgamation of the C.A.E. with Northern Rivers C.A.E. and the University of New England.
- 1989 Armidale C.A.E. ceased to exist as an autonomous entity.
- 1996 Decision taken by the University of New England to "mothball" the building.
- 1997 Launch of Friends of the Old Teachers' College (F.O.T.C.)
- 1999 November/December Launch of the New England Conservatorium of Music (NECOM).
- 2000 August 7 College Auditorium licensed for public performance.
- 2000 November 11 A replica of the College Book of Remembrance is dedicated.
- 2000 November 20 NECOM moves out of the building with the disbanding of the board.
- 2003 March 9 Dedication of World War Two Honour Boards in the top foyer.
- 2004 New England Conservatorium of Music established in the building.
- 2011 Negotiations between the Armidale Local Aboriginal Land Council and the University of New England to have Aboriginal remains repatriated from the University of Sydney to the CB Newling campus.
- 2017 University of New England concludes its management of the site, UNE Archives and Heritage Centre remains in former ATC library building
- 2021 January The NSW Government announced that the site will become one of the four hubs of the Department of Regional NSW

=== Modifications and dates ===
- 1933 Rose gardens instigated.
- 1935 Stained glass window "Wisdom" by Norman Carter presented by Howard Hinton.
- 1937 Stained glass window "Sport" by Norman Carter presented by Howard Hinton.
- 1947 Planning commenced for the Memorial Gardens.
- 1949 April 15 World War Two Memorial gates leading from Mossman Street officially opened.
- 1976 New Armidale College of Advanced Education library opened on 16 October; situated in the south west corner of the precinct.
- 1976 Formation of the Cafeteria, Members' Lounge, kitchens and games rooms on the ground floor of the western and southern wings.
- 1976 Formation of the Expressive Arts Studio in the East Quadrangle and modifications to internal areas on the ground floor of the east and north wings.
- 1976 Formation of a series of Curriculum Centre and a workshop space on the first floor.
- 1976 Removal of the Library from the main building and opening of the New England Historical Resources Centre in the former library space. Conversion of part of the library on the first floor into a lecture room and office space.
- 1977 College Union facilities opened on the ground floor of the west wing. These facilities included a cafeteria, members' lounge and kitchens and games rooms which were formed out of classrooms at the western end of the south wing.
- 1978 New stairs to replace the central southern stairs constructed. This meant the removal of the major stair located centrally in the southern wing and construction of a new reinforced concrete stair, which provided access from the grounds.
- 1982 Northern part of the Aboriginal Studies Centre constructed in the western quadrangle.
- 1983 The southern part of the Aboriginal Studies Centre constructed in the southern quadrangle.
- 1987 Sketch plans prepared for completion of the East Wing.

== Description ==
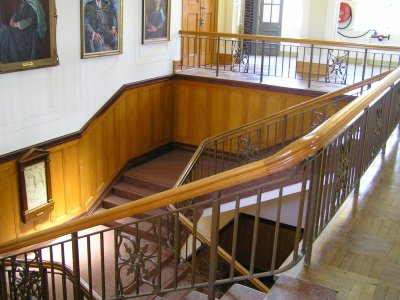
Entrance hall stairway, C.B. Newling Centre

=== Setting and grounds ===
The Armidale Teachers' College is an impressive Classical Revival building that stands high on a hill overlooking the City of Armidale set within its original attractive grounds.

=== Garden and grounds ===
The College Building is surrounded by gardens that are representative of the 1930s period. Until mid-2016, the north-eastern (main) vehicular entry to the precinct from Mossman Street was along an avenue of "English" (European) elm trees (Ulmus procera) – many dating from the time of the jail (c.1859–1920); and an "English" (European) oak (Quercus robur), past a hedge made of rosemary (Rosmarinus officinalis) as a War Memorial. The elm trees were removed in July 2016 after being deemed too hazardous to remain, and were replaced with juvenile English elm trees.

Formal rose gardens line the eastern and southern sides. Annual garden beds are dotted throughout the grounds. Deciduous trees including American pin oaks (Quercus palustris) and elms, are planted in a symmetrical arrangement down the sloping garden lawn to the southern boundary on Kentucky Street. Mature coniferous trees include Himalayan cedars (Cedrus deodara), Mediterranean cypress (Cupressus sempervirens (two pairs flank the main "front entrance" steps onto the front lawn, other pairs flank the building's main northern facade's east and west ends) and pines (Pinus spp.).

The formality of the garden is continued by the extensive hedges and mature trees planted on the western side of the main building. Shrubs are trimmed into "cubes" along the western (lawn) edge of the elm avenue, including "Irish" strawberry tree (Arbutus unedo) and Japanese laurel (Euonymus japonicus)

The gardens were designed and tended by the head gardener, Frederick T. Dye until his retirement in 1955. A memorial pond to Dye is a prominent feature of the landscaping. The entry to the grounds is by gates dedicated to World War Two Servicemen. A number of other memorials and memorial plantings are located throughout the grounds. The majority of the garden is still extant in design.

The Newling-Moran Reserve in Kentucky Street is where the former playing fields of the Armidale Teachers College were located. These included football ovals, tennis courts, basketball courts and cricket grounds. The reserve is now managed as NSW Crown Lands and was named after inaugural ATC Principal C.B. Newling and Michael Moran, the Head of Physical Education at the College in the 1940s and 50s. As well as local sporting clubs and facilities, this land now hosts the Museum of Education, New England Regional Art Museum, the Armidale Aboriginal Cultural Centre and Keeping Place and a community radio station.

=== Buildings ===
Based on the Sydney Teachers' College, it is built around two internal courtyards. At the time of the unveiling of the foundation stones, the "Armidale Express", 4 November 1929, described the building as "The style was free treatment of Italian Renaissance. The main portion was to be dominated by six Ionic columns, flanked by end pavilions partly enclosing the logia annexes. Above this rose circular headed well-portioned windows. The proposed finish was to be of beautifully tinted local bricks relieved with granolithic cement facing".

The building has a long hipped slate roof with colonnaded verandahs recessed under the roofline. The Armidale blue brick has rendered quoining around the windows and doorways. Wide steps lead to the verandah then into a central entrance hall with a staircase leading to the first floor and auditorium. This area features terrazzo, parquetry floor and a variety of local Australian timbers lining the walls. The central section of the building on its high verandah features massive, two storey, Ionic columns. The arches to the lower windows continue the effect of the verandah. No significant alterations have been completed to the front facade.

The main building features the College Auditorium with its stage, timbered and stepped seating. This was an important setting for assemblies, college drama, musicals, meetings and teaching. The Gymnasium is situated on the lower ground floor. It was constructed with special care and expert advice was sought. Apart from physical activities, it was the setting for the "Saturday Night" dance, significant social events for locals and students alike.

Situated to the west of the college, is the brick Principal's Residence built at the same period as the main building. It is a significant element in an outstanding grouping. It is a simply styled and proportioned domestic building, with a symmetrical facade. Design and materials complement the large adjoining Classical Revival College building. There is liver faced brick with rendered colonnade leading to the central recessed verandah; slate over verandah roofline but with arches unsympathetically glassed in. Formal entrance on the eastern side with garden steps at the front.

=== Condition ===
In 2006, the building was reported to be essentially unaltered with much of its original interior fabric intact, and the auditorium, ground floor and eastern wing had recently undergone restoration. However, in 2013, an independent review panel found that the building was in a state of disrepair.

The former elm trees leading from the front entrance in Mosman Street dated from the old jail. The archaeological potential of the jail is unclear at this time, although it is suggested by Elphick (1989, p. 23) that 450,000 bricks were recycled. Drummond specified that the bricks were not to be visible, he did not want any association with the jail. It is thought that the bricks were mainly used in the lower courses that were either out of sight or were rendered. Maps and photographs indicate the main jail buildings were located on the brow of the hill, the present location of the Armidale Teachers' College. Therefore, there is little likelihood of extensive archaeological evidence of the jail. Anecdotal evidence from the 1970s indicates there may be archaeological remains of outbuildings or other features, during road works a tank thought to be associated with the jail was uncovered.

When the jail was demolished in 1929, Aboriginal remains were found and removed to the University of Sydney. There is significant potential that further Aboriginal remains could be evident on the site.

The garden retains significant elements of a 1930s formal garden. The rose gardens were first established in 1933. Situated on the eastern and western sides of the college, the species trace the history of roses. The rosemary hedge and memorial gates are dedicated to those who died during World War Two. A memorial pool is dedicated to the first gardener, Frederick T. Dye, head gardener 1930–1954. The gardens provide the opportunity for research on garden design and introduced botanical species.

The college building has retained a relatively high degree of intact original fabric in major and lesser spaces. The building still retains much original fabric including parquetry floor, slate roof, terrazzo stairs. Restoration work has been completed in the auditorium, the eastern wing, the principal's office, the vice principal's office and the ground floor. The formal garden with its design and surviving plantings still provides a formal setting for the 1930s building.

== Heritage listing ==
The C. B. Newling Centre, formerly the Armidale Teachers' College, is of State significance. It was the first Teachers' College built outside the Sydney Metropolitan area to train country teachers for country service. The college played a significant role in the establishment of the University College of New England in 1938, leading to the establishment of the University of New England in 1954. It is also physical evidence of the influential New England New State Movement and the role country politicians played during the 1920s and 1930s, particularly the Local Member of Parliament, D. H. Drummond, in the decentralisation of education. The New State Movement heavily influenced State politics between the 1920s and the 1960s, using political parties and dissatisfaction with services in regional areas, to further their attempts to secede from New South Wales. The Movement significantly improved infrastructure in the region, with the C. B. Newling Centre being the first notable example of their success.

Architecturally, the centre is representative of the Interwar Georgian Revival Style, built in the period of the Great Depression. The building includes a commanding entrance, with the main staircase leading to the first floor and auditorium. Within the building, there is the use of local Australian timbers, terrazzo steps and parquetry floors. The building is an important component of the townscape, and local residents still describe the buildings as "The College on the Hill" reinforcing its landmark value. It has also retained a high degree of intact, original fabric in major and lesser spaces.

The notable gardens date from the early 1930s and, as such, are a rare and surprisingly intact representation of institutional gardening from that period. The garden features a mature parkland with pines, elms and poplars, sheltering rose gardens and other beds that are planted annually. The garden provides a magnificent setting for the centre, in keeping with the building style and era. The gardens therefore provide the opportunity for studies of formal garden design and varied botanical specimens favoured during the 1930s.

The memorials erected to students who fell during World War Two are a conscious statement of grief, participation and nationalism. As news was received at the college of the death of former lecturers and students, moving assemblies were held in the auditorium to commemorate their lives. At the end of World War Two, decisions were taken by staff and students to create a number of memorials, including: a small rosemary hedge, memorial gates at the entrance to the precinct, a remembrance book and later timber Honour Boards. These items remain within the grounds and the C.B. Newling Centre, in effect creating a war memorial relevant not just to the local population, but to the wider region.

The building has social and cultural significance to the many thousands of teaching, nursing, and other adult education students who have graduated from the institution, as well as the many academic and administrative staff who have worked there since 1929.

C B Newling Centre was listed on the New South Wales State Heritage Register on 8 November 2006 having satisfied the following criteria.

The place is important in demonstrating the course, or pattern, of cultural or natural history in New South Wales.

The C. B. Newling Centre is of State significance as the first teacher training institution constructed outside Sydney and was designed to train country teachers for country service. The construction of the centre marked the beginning of decentralised higher education. The Department of Education was struggling to fill teacher vacancies in regional and rural areas. Trainee teachers, once having tasted the delights of Sydney, did not want to return to the country and there was concern that the young minds were being exposed to the "sin and debauchery" of the city. It was commonly held that "what the teacher really thinks today, the pupil will practice tomorrow". It was therefore of paramount importance that the teachers, and thereby the students, were protected. With the Sydney Teachers' College overcrowded a new college needed to be constructed and, it was hoped, by placing it in the country, teachers would be more willing to return to their communities, or other regional areas, to serve as teachers. An additional advantage of a regional location was that reality could be injected into training teachers for the country. Programs to tackle the particular issues associated with teaching in the country had been trialled at the Sydney College, but were ineffectual as they lacked authenticity and no funds were available for teachers to undertake country residential. As a result of the construction of the Armidale Teachers' College a number of Demonstration Schools were established in the Armidale area.

The C. B. Newling Centre was an important plank in the plans of the New State Movement, a State significant historical phase. Inspired by Queensland's Northern Separation Movement, residents of the New England region wanted to secede from the remainder of NSW and form their own state. Dissatisfaction arose from a perceived lack of representation and services from the Sydney-based Parliament, an example being a refusal to link the north coast to Queensland by rail, bridge or by clearing the mouth of the Clarence River for navigation. In order for the desired new state to be viable, infrastructure was needed and this included higher education facilities. Minister for Education and Local Member D. H. Drummond sympathised with the Movement and ensured the college was constructed in Armidale as a first step in accumulating the necessary infrastructure. The New State Movement had a significant influence on State politics between the 1920s and 1967, when the scheme was finally laid to rest after referendum rejected the idea. Sir Earle Christmas Grafton Page, Member for the Federal seat of Cowper, and Drummond were able to improve infrastructure in the region and decentralise services to the extent that a new state was no longer seen as a major objective.

The C. B. Newling Centre is of State significance for the major role it played in the establishment of the University of New England. The presence of the college inspired the government with confidence that the University College would be viable. College Principal, C.B. Newling became a professor of education at the University College.

The C. B. Newling Centre is of State significance in demonstrating the pattern of diversification in education. In time, the institution moved from pre-Teacher Education training to offering wider Adult Education courses, particularly in the areas of Nurse Education, Aboriginal Education and Post-Graduate Education. In close association with the University of New England and the development of the Advanced Education movement, courses were offered by distance education. Because of its design and relatively intact fabric, the methods and conditions of teacher training in the twentieth century can be interpreted. Modifications to the fabric allow for comparative interpretation of changes in teacher and other tertiary education over the sixty-year period from 1929. An examination of the fabric of the building demonstrates the changing teaching methods of the college. For example, the Armidale Teachers' College (A.T.C.) became a College of Advanced Education (C.A.E.) in 1971 and changes in curricula and teaching methods led to a number of changes to the main building from 1976. This meant the construction of a large purpose built library, the establishment of Curriculum Centres and the two internal courtyards to be filled with structures. The increased role of student associations was reflected in the creation of a student member's lounge, a cafeteria and kitchens in the west wing. Games Rooms were also formed out of classrooms at the western end of the south wing.

The place has a strong or special association with a person, or group of persons, of importance of cultural or natural history of New South Wales's history.

The C. B. Newling Centre is of State significance as physical evidence of the power and foresight of the Progressive Party (fore-runner of the Country Party). These politicians, particularly D.H. Drummond, were committed to the principle of decentralisation, employment opportunities in regional areas and the New England State Movement.

The C. B. Newling Centre is of State significance through its associations with art collections in NSW. In November 1929 Howard Hinton, Trustee of the National Art Gallery of N.S.W., made his first donation to the college. Over a 20-year period Hinton donated around 1100 art works to the college. Today, the Howard Hinton collection is housed in the New England Regional Art Museum, but within the C.B. Newling Centre are two outstanding leadlight windows by the Australian artist, Norman Carter presented in 1935 and 1937. In the foyer are several portraits of the various Principals, as well as S.H. Smith, former director of Education and D.H. Drummond. The college is also associated with the protection of the National Art Gallery of N.S.W. and Mitchell Library collections during World War Two. Parts of the collections were secretly stored in the basement of the college, in the event that Sydney was bombed. Newling was immensely proud of this aspect of his war service.

The C. B. Newling Centre is of regional significance in that the construction of the Armidale Teachers' College consolidated the importance of education to Armidale and the wider New England Region. The college influenced the development of education by training students for country service as well as conducting courses for small schools. The establishment of the college meant the creation of the Armidale Demonstration School and the establishment of smaller schools close to Armidale to provide a small school experience for student teachers.

The place is important in demonstrating aesthetic characteristics and/or a high degree of creative or technical achievement in New South Wales.

The C. B. Newling Centre is of State aesthetic significance as an example of Interwar Georgian Revival Architecture, in a collegiate context. The Ionic columns, spanning two stories, is an unusual feature in Australian architecture. Collegiate Georgian Revival Architecture is currently under-represented in the State Heritage Register. Despite being built in the depression, David H. Drummond ensured that the college was built of the best materials. He authorised additional expenditure for a slate roof, specialised library stacks and interior features including terrazzo and parquetry flooring in the entrance hall as well as wood panelled walls. The entrance hall stairway is also decorated with flower motif ironwork.

The landscaped lawn and mature trees are State significant as representative of the features of a 1930s institutional garden. The significance arises from the relationship between the building and the grounds, which exemplifies the taste for surrounding Interwar Georgian Revival free-standing buildings with formal gardens. As such, it is comparable to North Sydney Boys School, although the more extensive building program there has compromised the School's integrity. Between the establishment of the garden in 1930 and the recent past there has been only four head gardeners. These gardeners usually began as juniors and, upon obtaining the position of head gardener, continued the work of the previous incumbent. In this way, the garden layout and aesthetic retains significant elements and links to the original garden. The first gardener, Frederick T. Dye, created a landscape very much formed by thoughts of the day. The formal rose gardens situated on the eastern and southern sides of the college building, were planted in 1933 and continue in their original layout. Deciduous trees including pin oaks and elms are planted in a symmetrical arrangement down a sloping lawn to the southern boundary on Kentucky Street. It is this setting which provided an amphitheatre for Graduation Ceremonies for college students for many years. The northern lawn features several diamond and oval planters, laid out in a formal pattern. The traditional of filling these planters with annuals in the college/University colours continues. The mature elm trees situated on the front driveway and pines along Faulkner Street date from the previous use of the site as a jail, between 1859 and 1920. The south garden is dominated by a grove of Pistachio trees that complement the Poplar trees lining Faulkner Street.

The C. B. Newling Centre is of local significance as an important component of the Armidale townscape and its landmark value is reinforced by local residents who describe the building as "The College on the Hill".

The place has strong or special association with a particular community or cultural group in New South Wales for social, cultural or spiritual reasons.

The C. B. Newling Centre has State social and cultural significance to the many thousands of teaching, nursing and other adult education students who have graduated from the institution, as well as the many academic and administrative staff who have worked there since 1929. This significance is demonstrated by the turn-out for the Golden Jubilee (1928–1978), when 39 of the 63 inaugural class students returned for the celebrations. For many years, the Easter Re-unions and Year Re-unions played a significant part in the life of the college and of the Armidale community. To the local residents, being invited as a guest to the "Saturday Night College Dance" was an important part of the social calendar.

The C.B. Newling Centre gardens are of State significance as a memorial to students and staff who fell during World War Two. Parents of those college servicemen and women were invited to attend the Memorial Services dedicated to the memory of those who had fallen. The Friday Assembly became a regular feature of college life during the war and was refined as the casualty lists grew and students were killed. Memorials include: an entrance gateway with the inscription 'Men of college who gave their lives in the service of their country in World War 1938–45'; a memorial rosemary hedge, situated at the top of the main driveway leading from the memorial gates; a Book of Remembrance, unveiled in 1949; and a timber Honour Roll unveiled in 2003.

The place has potential to yield information that will contribute to an understanding of the cultural or natural history of New South Wales.

The C. B. Newling Centre is of State research potential for providing an opportunity to investigate the way that an institution during World War Two set out to commemorate the fallen: initially by moving formal ceremonies held in the college auditorium and later by the construction of varied memorials including a gateway, rosemary hedge, Remembrance Book and Honour Rolls.

The surviving glass windows designed by the Australian artist, Norman Carter, provide an opportunity for a comparative study of the work of this artist as well as a study of stained glass windows in the wider community.

The discovery of Aboriginal remains during the demolition of the Armidale Gaol in 1929 also raises the potential for further archaeological findings to be made on the site.

The place possesses uncommon, rare or endangered aspects of the cultural or natural history of New South Wales.

The C.B. Newling Centre is rare in the State context in that it is the first teacher education building to be constructed in N.S.W. outside the Sydney Metropolitan area. It is a rare institution because of the political association with the movement to establish a University College in Armidale and the New State Movement.

The steel and glass floors in the library stack (1930) are a significant internal element due to their rarity and as a technical innovation. The C.B. Newling Centre was one of the first to utilize the new system at considerable additional cost

The place is important in demonstrating the principal characteristics of a class of cultural or natural places/environments in New South Wales.

The C.B. Newling Centre is of State significance for being representative of the Interwar Georgian Revival architecture developed during the interwar years and the Great Depression period in particular. The centre is representative of the use of this style for educational institutions.

The building represents the way that changing curricula and teaching methods influences the design of an educational institution. This is particularly evident in the changes introduced in the 1970s when the Teachers' College became a College of Advanced Education.
