= New England Regional Art Museum =

Coordinates: 30.5252°S 151.6648°E

New England Regional Art Museum (NERAM)

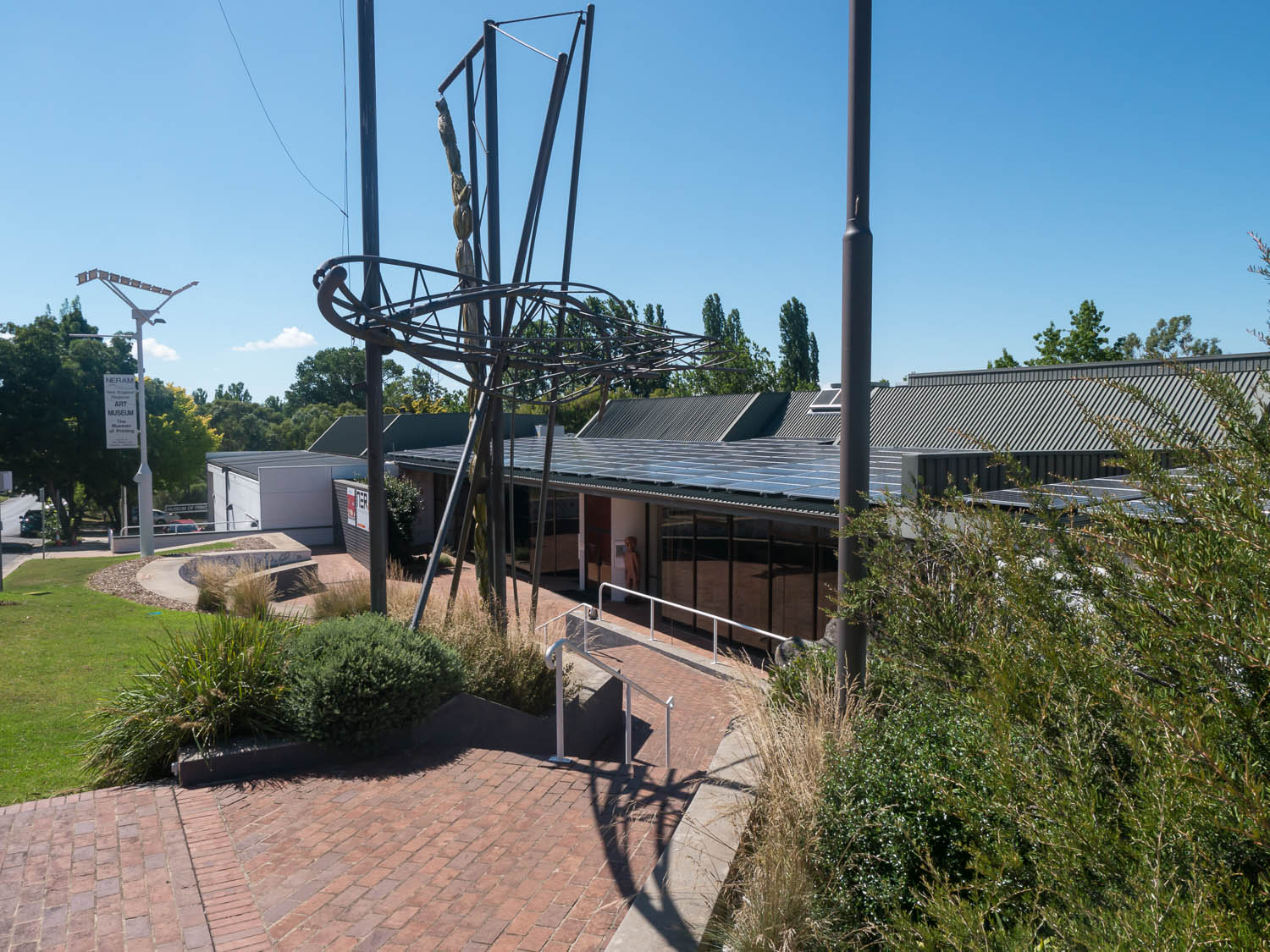
- Established: 1983
- Location: Armidale, New South Wales, Australia
- Type: Art museum
- Key holdings: Mosman's Bay, McMahon's Point Ferry, Near Streeton's Camp at Sirius Cove
- Collections: Howard Hinton, Chandler Coventry, NERAM, Armidale City, Museum of Printing
- Collection size: 4,500
- Visitors: 40,000 annually
- Director: Rachael Parsons
- Chairperson: Robert Clarke
- Architect: Andrew Andersons
- Owner: NERAM Limited
- Parking: on and off street (no charge)
- Website: www.neram.com.au

The New England Regional Art Museum, known as NERAM, is a museum of Australian art located in Armidale in the New England region of New South Wales. NERAM's art collections are the second largest and most valuable regional public collection in NSW after the Newcastle Art Gallery. NERAM's collections are valued in excess of A$39 million. The NERAM complex is a significant cultural tourism destination that includes six gallery spaces, a Museum of Printing, an artist-in-residence studio, educational facilities, shop and café.

== History ==
NERAM opened in 1983. The museum was purpose-built to house and exhibit the collections of its two main benefactors, Howard Hinton and Chandler Coventry, as well as the existing Armidale City Art Collection and the NERAM Collection.

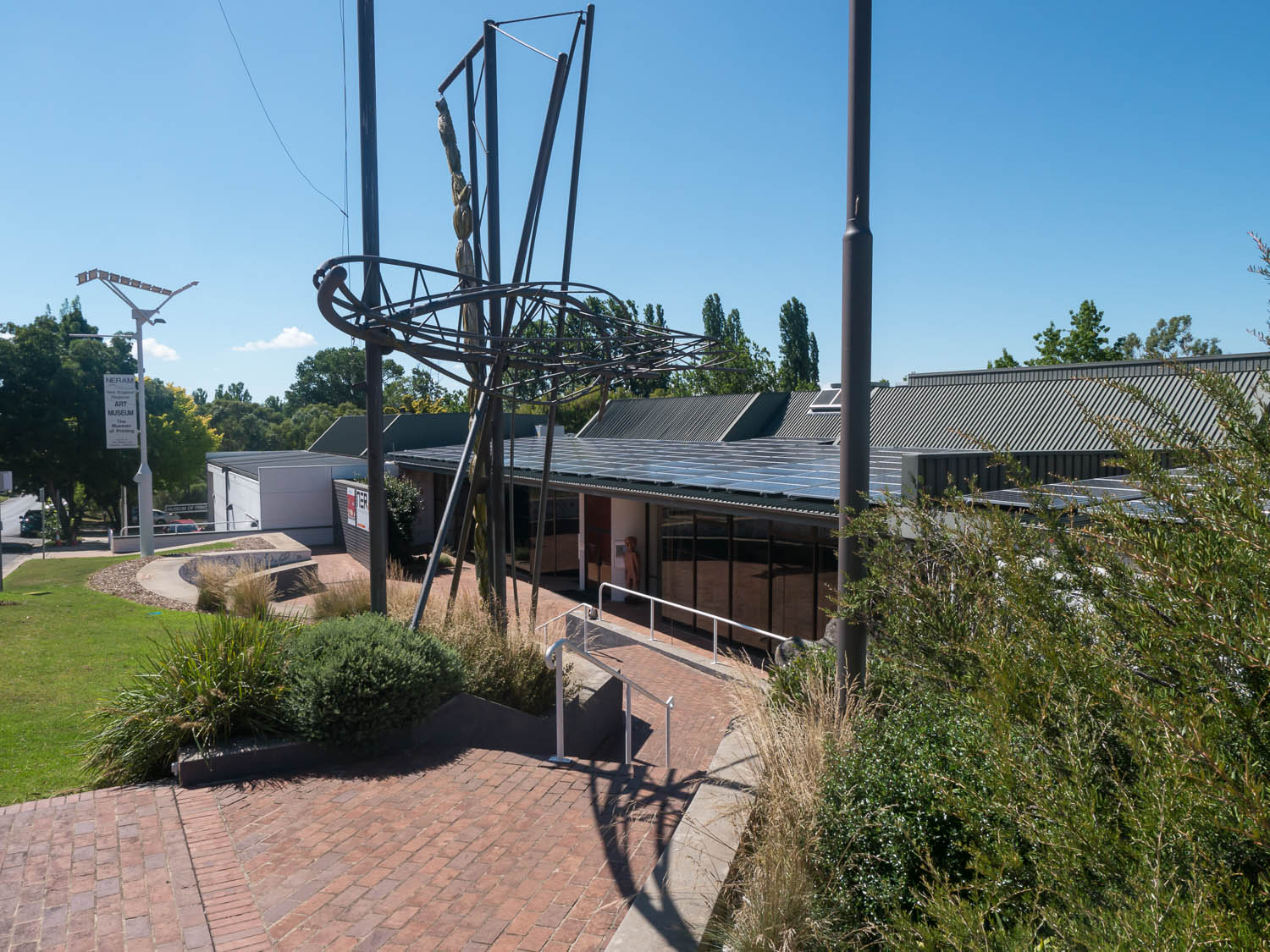
NERAM exterior

The Armidale community ran a long-term fundraising effort to build a dedicated museum as a home for these collections, and with matching grants from the NSW State government NERAM was formally opened by the Premier of New South Wales, Neville Wran, on 26 March 1983.

NERAM was built on land within the Newling Moran Reserve, NSW Crown Land that was formerly part of the Armidale Teachers College precinct, the original home of the Howard Hinton Collection. NSW Government Architect's Special Projects Division, under its Director Andrew Andersons and Project Architect David Turner, prepared detailed sketch plans, and Armidale firm Magoffin and Deakin prepared the working drawings and specifications and supervised construction.

In 1997 a Stage II extension designed by architect Colin Still was added to increase display areas, heighten the building's indoor/outdoor relationships, and include a café and artist’s studio.

== Collections ==
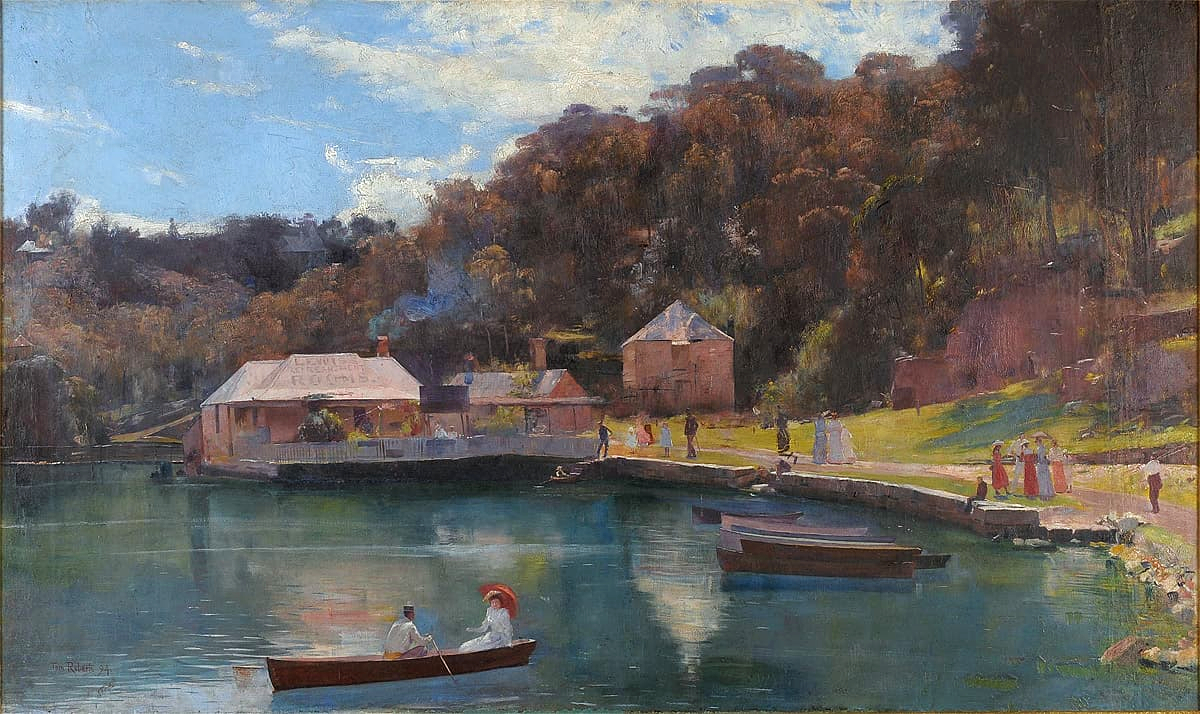
Tom Roberts, Mosman's Bay, 1894, part of the Howard Hinton Collection

NERAM is the custodian of several important collections of Australian art:

- The Howard Hinton Collection of Australian art from the 1880s to the 1940s
- The Chandler Coventry Collection of Australian art from the 1960s and 1970s
- The NERAM Collection of Australian art from the Twentieth century to the present day
- The Armidale City Collection, and
- The Museum of Printing collection including the F.T. Wimble & Co. Collection of printing type and equipment.

These collections bring together over 4,500 works with particular strengths in nineteenth and twentieth century Australian art. They include significant works by artists including Arthur Streeton, Tom Roberts, Nora Heysen, Elioth Gruner, Margaret Preston, Brett Whiteley, James Gleeson, Tony Tuckson, and Christo.

=== The Howard Hinton Collection ===
Sydney-based collector and benefactor Howard Hinton OBE began donating pictures to the Armidale Teacher’s College in 1929. He aimed to "illustrate comprehensively the development of Australia art" from 1880. His gifts to the College finally totalled over 1,000 works following his death in 1948. By the 1970s it was evident that these valuable and significant works required secure housing, curatorship, preservation and environmental management not available within the open doors and corridors of a teacher’s college.

Barry Pearce, former head curator of Australian Art at the Art Gallery of New South Wales described the Hinton donation as including "many magnificent Australian landscapes by a range of major and minor artists ... crowned by such masterpieces as Arthur Streeton's Morning Sketch (aka McMahon's Point Ferry) 1890 and Near Streeton's camp at Sirius Cove, 1892 and, the jewel in the crown, Mosman's Bay, 1894 by Tom Roberts."

In 2016 a significant donation of 11 works by seminal artists of the Hinton period was made to NERAM by arts benefactor John Gale OBE to complement the Hinton collection.

In February 2018 a permanent Hinton Collection exhibition - featuring a dense salon-hang of over a hundred and thirty of the most iconic works from the Hinton Collection - was opened in the museum's refurbished East Gallery by former Director of the Art Gallery of New South Wales Edmund Capon. Major works from the Hinton donation will be progressively cycled through this gallery. Commentators have declared that this opening "establishes NERAM in the top rank of galleries outside the [Australian] capital cities."

=== Chandler Coventry Collection ===
Sydney gallerist Chandler Coventry, described as a "quintessential country boy who became a leader in cutting edge contemporary art" was a driving force in the campaign to establish NERAM in his hometown.

Coventry grew up in the Armidale area — his "earliest encounters with ‘high art’ were through the Howard Hinton Collection, which he saw as a schoolchild displayed in the rooms and corridors of the Armidale Teachers’ College."

An art collector like Hinton, Coventry also established Coventry Gallery (1971-1999) in Paddington, Sydney where he displayed artworks by leading Australian and international artists including Howard Arkley and Christo.

In 1981 he offered his personal collection of 300 artworks, described as "one of the most important collections of contemporary Australian art" on the understanding that an art museum would be built to house both his and Hinton's collections.

Coventry, a survey exhibition in 2020 at NERAM explored his legacy and included the 1983 Archibald Prize winning Portrait of Chandler Coventry by artist Nigel Thompson as well as works by Angus Nivison, Martin Sharp, Janet Dawson, Peter Booth and Brett Whiteley.

== Facilities ==
The museum includes six galleries: Sir William Dobell Art Foundation Gallery, Dulce Lindsay Gallery, East Gallery, Lalor Harris Gallery, Mazda Gallery, and West Gallery, as well as the Packsaddle Artist's Studio, the Museum of Printing, a residency studio and function space.

The NERAM Research Library incorporates Howard Hinton's valuable library collections of books, memorabilia and historical documents, within a general collection of books, exhibition catalogues and publications on Australian and international art.

The Howard Hinton Archive contains both personal reminiscences of Howard Hinton – letters, diaries, poems – and historical documents surrounding the bequest – records of previous owners, valuations, and exhibition histories.

== Management ==
At the time of construction in 1983, the New England Regional Art Museum Reserve Trust Board was established. This body managed the museum and its operations until 2005 when Armidale Dumaresq Council was appointed Manager of the Reserve Trust by order of the Minister for Lands.

In June 2008, the Reserve Trust was renamed the Armidale Community Cultural Reserve Trust. Armidale Dumaresq Council continued to manage the museum as Reserve Trust Manager until July 1, 2008 when NERAM Limited, a new not-for-profit company Limited by Guarantee took ownership and commenced managing operation of the facilities and artworks in its care.

The museum’s program includes a mixture of touring exhibitions from other institutions, displays and exhibitions curated in-house from the collections. Regional artists are also invited to submit exhibition proposals of their work.

== Support and funding ==
"NERAM does not receive its core funding in the same way as other regional galleries in NSW, which are owned by their local government authority."

NERAM is an incorporated body. Its income is derived from a funding agreement with the Armidale Regional Council (formerly Armidale Dumaresq Council), operational grants from the NSW government through Create NSW, philanthropic support from the Margaret Olley Art Trust, membership fees, project grants, donations, art class fees, commercial sponsorship, shop trading, functions hire and fundraising.

The NERAM Foundation was established in 2009 to support the museum, and the Friends of NERAM provides membership and community involvement. The museum's major annual fundraising project, 'Packsaddle', is an exhibition and commissioned sale of original artworks provided by galleries and artists from across Australia; the funds raised are donated for the acquisition of works for the NERAM Collection. The ongoing Adopt-an-Artwork fundraising program raises funds from donors to support the conservation treatment of collection items.

=== Controversy ===
In 2006 it was revealed that the museum's accumulated debt to the Armidale Dumaresq Council had amounted to over A$480,000. A plan was devised to sell a half-share of Tom Robert's Mosman's Bay to the Art Gallery of New South Wales so that the painting would spend alternate years in Armidale and Sydney. Mosman's Bay is one of the iconic works from the Hinton donation, valued at the time at A$3.6 million, and described by the then head curator of Australian art at the Art Gallery of New South Wales, Barry Pearce, as a "great masterpiece, and quintessentially Sydney".

The proposed half-sale created deep divisions in the Armidale and the wider arts communities between those wanting to put NERAM on a sound financial footing and those wanting to respect Hinton's intentions and the integrity of the collection. The case was eventually taken to the New South Wales Supreme Court in 2009 where Chief Justice Young found that the painting could not be sold due to a trust deed put in place by Hinton. Armidale Dumaresq Council was removed as a trustee and NERAM Ltd was appointed as a new trustee.

NERAM commenced a process of selling off duplicate and other works from non-deed sources to repay the outstanding debt. Between July 2006 and June 2016, the Armidale Community Cultural Reserve Trust responsible for the museum repaid more than $300,000 to the council. In June 2016 the debt was finally settled following an anonymous donation of $50,000 and the Armidale Regional Council forgiving the remaining $100,000.

== Museum of Printing ==
Within NERAM, the Museum of Printing houses a historically significant collection of printing machinery and equipment, the F T Wimble & Co. Collection.

This collection includes historical printing presses, a Linotype machine, guillotines, book binding equipment, sets of rare wooden and metal type. These objects are on permanent display in an exhibition interpreting the history of printing in Australia from 1850 to the early 1900s. There are over 1,000 printing blocks and a comprehensive library of books on printing and technical manuals.

Displays of small equipment and printed products from the collection change regularly, with temporary exhibitions and workshops presented within the space by volunteers, artists and members of the Black Gully Printmakers, resident community arts group.

The museum is the only Australian member of the Association of European Printing Museums (AEPM).
