= Jaye Walton =

Australian television personality

Joan Muriel Walton OAM (née Brewer; 27 December 1928 – 21 March 2017), better known as Jaye Walton, was an Australian media and journalism personality. She was a businesswoman, television personality and producer, and magazine publisher. Walton was the first South Australian woman to produce and host a television show which, by 1979, was the state's longest running show. She was also the first publisher of SA magazine and a documentary film maker. Walton raised awareness and funds for children's health and welfare charities in Australia and Thailand.

== Biography ==
Born in Adelaide, South Australia, she was the daughter of British sea captain, Frederick Henry Brewer, and Muriel Beatrice Brewer (nee Barlow). Walton spent her early childhood in India and England. When her family moved back to Adelaide, she attended Methodist Ladies College (now Annesley). After leaving school, she attended Miss Mann's Business College. Walton married John Hall Walton in 1950 at St Columba's Church, Hawthorn, and spent the next ten years raising their two children.

After her husband was injured in a car accident, Walton returned to the workforce to become a model and attended modelling school. She opened ‘L’Elegance’ in 1962, a South Australian charm and grooming school. She worked in England giving classes to women on a Greek ship and went to Woomera to teach the wives of men working on the rocket range.

In 1968 she hosted and produced her own show, Touch of Elegance on SAS 10. It began as a half-hour time slot once a week but, after a year in production, it was so popular it became a daily show. The show later expanded to a one-hour time-slot each week day. When Walton stepped down as the host in 1979, Touch of Elegance was the longest running television show in South Australian history. In 1992 ‘’Touch of Elegance’’ was renamed ‘‘AM Adelaide’’ and this show continued until 2003 with hosts including Ann Wills, Richard Marsland and Jan Beasley. Walton interviewed local and international celebrities, politicians, authors, artists, make-up artists and hairdressers, actors and musicians. During a 1976 episode, Barry Humphries, playing the character Sir Les Patterson, crashed her segment and viewers were left both entertained and surprised.

From 1982 to 1987 she was the first publisher of SAM (South Australian Magazine), with its focus on SA happenings and events.

On 4 June 1977 she was made a Royal Knight of the Hutt River Province by Prince Leonard and gained the title of Lady.

She wrote, produced and hosted a documentary on Israel in 1976, narrated a documentary film about the Seychelles in 1977 and a documentary about the Thai Royal family in 1979. In 1979 she was appointed SA and NT honorary consul to Thailand, a position she held until her death in 2017. In 1990 Walton moved to Thailand and co-hosted Morning Talk with Valerie McKenzie, and then her own show, Thai-Oz Talk until 2013. Thai-Oz aired in Australia in 2004 on Channel 31, at the time it reportedly had 12.5 million viewers in Thailand and neighbouring countries on Saturdays, and reached 168 countries via satellite.

In 1991, Thailand's then-King Bhumibol awarded her the medal of the Royal White Elephant for her services to charity.

Throughout her life in both Australia and Thailand, Walton worked for children's health and welfare charities raising funds and awareness, primarily Thailand's National Cancer Institute and the International Peace Foundation. In 1980 she was awarded the Order of Australia for Community Service. Walton mentored South Australian newsreader Jane Reilly, with Reilly describing Walton as a "TV trailblazer"

== Death ==
Walton died at the age of 88 at Fullerton Lutheran Homes where she had resided in her last years.

== Television ==
- Touch of Elegance 1968 – 1979 SAS 10 Producer and host
- Morning Talk
- Walton's World 1999– ACE TV Channel 6 Producer and host
- Thai Oz Talk 1990s–2013 Producer and host

== Documentaries ==
- Portes Ouvertes En France / Open Doors of France 1977
- Seychelles - The Enchanted Islands 1977
- Jerusalem Now – Royal David's City 1977
- The Working Royals of Thailand, 1979
- A Question of Beauty 1978
