= Howard Hinton (art patron) =

Australian art patron and benefactor

Howard Hinton OBE
- Norman Carter (1875–1963), Portrait of Howard Hinton Esq, OBE. Oil on canvas, 1936.
- Born: 10 November 1866; Croydon, Surrey, England
- Died: 23 January 1948 (aged 81); Sydney, New South Wales, Australia
- Known for: art patron and benefactor
- Awards: OBE

Howard Hinton OBE (10 November 1866 – 23 January 1948) was an Australian art patron and benefactor. A thwarted artist due to shortsightedness, he visited many of the great galleries of Europe in his youth. At age 24 he migrated to Australia and quickly associated with leading artists of the Heidelberg School and the bohemian artists' camps around Sydney Harbour in the 1890s. He built a successful career in shipping and, along with a family inheritance, used his moderate wealth to support waves of Australian artists in the first half of the twentieth century. Through extensive donations to the Art Gallery of New South Wales and particularly the Armidale Teachers' College he became one of the greatest benefactors in Australian art history.

== Early life ==
Born in Croydon, Surrey, November 10, 1866 Hinton's early schooling was at Mr Hester's school, Margate, and Mr Southee's school, Ramsgate, before he attended Whitgift Grammar School, South Croydon, until fifth form in 1883. His passion for art developed at an early age. As a youth he took parentally-financed vacations with his brother to some of the great galleries of Europe. He even attended art classes at Continental schools, but acute near-sightedness frustrated any hope of becoming an artist himself.

Howard's father, Thomas, was a commission merchant, a broker trading for marginal returns. Howard was given early experience in this trade which was to be the basis for his future career. As a young man Hinton was rather plump, pink, short-sighted, wearing very thick optical lenses, diffident in manner, shy, and he "only really dropped his guard with his closest friends."

== Migration to Australia and business career ==
Hinton sailed to Australia on board the Torridon departing London in 1890 at the age of twenty three. Through the shipping agent Dangar, Gedye & Co. he gained employment with merchant agents W. & A. McArthur Ltd. in Sydney.

Employed in shipping, Hinton took the opportunity to combine business and travel. He journeyed widely through the Pacific in the 1890s on several vessels. On an 1898 trip he met and stayed with the New Zealand artist Charles Goldie before travelling on to Rarotonga and Tahiti. Then, in 1904, his firm gave him charge of a speculative venture to take a refurbished steamer, the Macquarie, to the Far East carrying wheat, wool, oats and paying passengers to Yokohama during the Russo-Japanese War of 1904–1905. When the war ended abruptly Hinton shrewdly used the Macquarie to trade in Asian waters. Sixty-two pages of diary entries and four photographic albums give detailed record of these exotic years: trading, sightseeing and dining between ports in Japan, China, Hong Kong and Vietnam. He finally sold the Macquarie for more than double the firm's required price and returned to Sydney via Manila and German New Guinea in 1906.

When his firm was reconstituted in 1908 as the McArthur Shipping & Agency Co. Ltd., Hinton remained with the company, thus spending his entire working life in Australia with the one business, rising to directorship in 1916 and enjoying moderate wealth. At the age of 61 in 1928 he retired and set out on an extended stay in England and Europe including visits to many art galleries and studios. Though he corresponded frequently he did not return to Australia till 1931.

== Lifestyle and involvement with arts ==
Immediately after migrating to Australia in 1890 Hinton made friends with artists including Julian Ashton, Livingston Hopkins, Tom Roberts, Albert Henry Fullwood, Vic Mann and Arthur Streeton. He was a frequent visitor to and sometime inhabitant of several of the artists' camps set up on the foreshores of Sydney harbour, and began buying paintings. His art purchasing was predominantly based in Sydney, on Sydney exhibitions, galleries and studios.

He boarded with the Sabiel family at Glenmire in Stanley Street in nearby Balmoral for ten years. Following his two years trading in Asia, he returned to Glenmire then lived with the Sabiels at other addresses on Sydney's north shore for most of the next fifteen years. In 1919 Hinton and the Sabiels took rooms for a period in Hazelhurst, an upmarket boarding house in Murdoch Street Cremorne, and in 1920 Hinton became a permanent boarder there, living the life of a bachelor in a serviced room till his death in 1948. Laundry, starched shirts and meals were provided with his board. He ate a traditional breakfast, dressed for a three-course dinner – sometimes with invited guests – and usually took lunch in town, often at the Millions Club in Rowe Street which still exists as The Sydney Club. He frequently wore spats and always carried a walking stick. He was quiet, courteous and self-effacing, but also exceedingly generous, giving paintings to friends and presents to Hazelhurst staff, all of whom he remembered in his will.

Besides diarising his travels, Hinton was an active correspondent and dabbled in occasional verse, both with humour and gentle wit. He was a firm Anglican and a loyalist. At the time of World War I he was twice refused enlistment in the AIF because of his poor eyesight. However, he "gave freely of his money during this war and also in World War II when he divided his funds on the strict basis of a quarter for buying paintings from needy young artists and three quarters for the R.A.A.F. and A.I.F. Comforts Funds." He rarely spoke of his charitable works but examples are known, from helping unemployed youths to buying beds for a youth hostel in Narrabeen, and buying paintings from artists struggling in the Great Depression.

== Patron and benefactor of Australian art ==
From his Sydney base Hinton continued to support artists, for example assisting Elioth Gruner with overseas travel and assisting the widow and family of deceased young artist J J Hilder. He visited artists' studios and was a familiar figure at galleries, openings and showrooms. He used his wealth to acquire their work despite having little display or storage space in his boarding-house room. He famously kept fewer than a dozen cherished works on the walls – and a similar number of Norman Lindsay watercolours and drawings in a metal trunk by his bed – whilst eventually giving in excess of 1,500 works to institutions. Norman Lindsay wrote that Hinton "worked hard at his business career only to acquire money to devote to art, spending nothing on himself", and Leon Gellert wrote that Hinton "never "donated" his gifts. They were transmitted – ever so gently, as though by sleight-of-hand."

By 1935 the Melbourne Age reported glowingly that "Mr. Howard Hinton's benefactions to the National Art Gallery and to the gallery at Armidale now amount in value to approximately £100,000. No man living in Australia during his lifetime has spent so much money among living artists and helped art along in the way it should go as this fine patron, concerning whose art appreciation and assistance to artists, as well as creating a love of fine art among his fellow men, too much cannot be said."

=== National Art Gallery of New South Wales ===
Hinton made his first gift of artworks to the Art Gallery of New South Wales (then the National Art Gallery of New South Wales) in 1914. He continued giving to the gallery and was made a trustee in 1919, a position he held till his death in 1948, by which time he had donated 122 pictures including important works by E. Phillips Fox, Elioth Gruner, George Lambert, Roberts and Streeton. During his retirement holiday to England and Europe in 1928 he purchased and forwarded several paintings as further donations to the gallery. However, as these were not Australian works and acquired without consultation, his fellow Trustees decided to defer acceptance. Hinton offered more European works in 1929, but was informed that any such paintings must be approved before being acquired for donation. It is speculated that Hinton fell out with his fellow Trustees over this issue, and that this led to him channeling his future donations towards a different institution – the Armidale Teachers' College – but in fact he continued as a Trustee of the Art Gallery of New South Wales and gave further (Australian) paintings which were accepted.

=== Armidale Teachers' College ===
These constrictions on his ability to donate works of his choice to the state gallery, however, did encourage him to look elsewhere. While still in England, he wrote his enquiry to the Minister of Education, David Drummond, who had ministerial responsibility for the gallery. Drummond was the NSW state member for Armidale and asked the Director of Education in New South Wales (NSW), S. H. Smith, to write to Hinton suggesting the recently founded Armidale Teachers' College, the first teachers' college built outside the Sydney metropolitan area to train country teachers for country service, as a destination for his donations. Hinton agreed, and the Principal of the Teachers' College, C. B. Newling, wrote to him in London and "profusely accepted the donation."

The first work received, Adrian Stokes' The Lock Gates, was hung in the Teachers' College while Hinton was still abroad. From 1931 paintings began to arrive regularly at the college, including those by the European artists declined by the National Art Gallery of New South Wales. Hinton visited the Armidale institution in 1932 and was feted by students and staff. In 1933 he dispatched six separate crates containing 51 works including landmark paintings such as Tom Roberts' Mosman's Bay. In that year he also presented a Declaration of Trust through the Crown Solicitor to the Armidale Teachers' College, formally stating the terms of his continuing gift. In appreciation of his benefactions, the 1933 student session presented to the college a bronze bust of Hinton by Rayner Hoff. Similarly, the 1935-6 session commissioned a Hinton portrait by Norman Carter.

Hinton's donations were not housed in a single gallery of the teacher's college, but hung and displayed throughout the institution's halls, foyer, common rooms and classrooms, so that the college's young teacher trainees would have daily exposure to fine contemporary art.

Hinton made eight more visits to the Teachers' College in the ensuing years, and formed a close relationship with the first Principal, C. B. Newling, with whom he kept up written correspondence. He also commissioned and gave two themed stained glass windows by Norman Carter to the college – Wisdom in 1935, and Sport in 1937. Following his example, other donors added works to the Howard Hinton Collection.

Hinton clearly derived pleasure from buying and giving art, and articulated his motives in 1947:
"My object was to provide a complete collection illustrating the development of Australian art from 1880 onwards, and my action in making the gift to the Armidale Teachers' College was prompted by my great interest in Australian education ..." His beliefs were in keeping with the view of art as a means of inculcating civilising values.

Hinton has been described by Arthur Streeton and Norman Lindsay as one of Australia's great art benefactors alongside Alfred Felton, David Scott Mitchell and Sir Baldwin Spencer. By the end of his life in 1948 he had donated over a thousand works to the Teachers' College in Armidale representing the work of hundreds of Australian artists including Arthur Streeton, Tom Roberts, Nora Heysen, Hans Heysen, Elioth Gruner, Margaret Preston, William Dobell, Adrian Feint, Ethel Spowers, Roy De Maistre, Thea Proctor, Lloyd Rees, Lance Solomon, and the Lindsay family. Barry Pearce, former head curator of Australian Art at the Art Gallery of New South Wales described the Hinton donation as including "many magnificent Australian landscapes by a range of major and minor artists ... crowned by such masterpieces as Arthur Streeton's Morning Sketch (aka McMahon's Point Ferry) 1890 and Near Streeton's camp at Sirius Cove, 1892 and, the jewel in the crown, Mosman's Bay, 1894 by Tom Roberts."

A complete list of works donated to both the Art Gallery of New South Wales and the Armidale Teachers' College was published in 1951. The Hinton donations included his valuable collections of art books, memorabilia, historical documents, journals and catalogues, largely incorporated into the NERAM library, and the Howard Hinton Archive.

=== New England Regional Art Museum (NERAM) ===
In 1971 the Armidale Teachers' College became a College of Advanced Education and began offering a range of courses beyond teaching. By the 1970s it was evident that the valuable and significant works donated by Hinton required levels of secure housing, curatorship, preservation and environmental management not available within the open doors and corridors of a public college. The Armidale community began a long-term fundraising effort to build a dedicated museum, and with matching grants from the NSW State government the New England Regional Art Museum (NERAM) was formally opened by the Premier of NSW, the Honourable Neville Wran QC, on 26 March 1983.

=== Hinton Collection ===
NERAM now houses the Hinton Collection and in February 2018 a permanent exhibition, Hinton: Treasures of Australian art, featuring over a hundred and thirty of the most iconic works from the collection, was opened in the museum's East Gallery by former Director of the Art Gallery of New South Wales, Edmund Capon. Works remain on display for limited periods at a time to avoid damage from extended exposure.

== Death ==
Howard Hinton died of severe pneumonia, heart failure, and the ravages of Parkinson's disease on 23 January 1948. He was cremated with Anglican rites after a funeral service at his church, St James, King Street, Sydney.

== Honours, decorations, awards and distinctions ==
- Made a Trustee of the National Art Gallery of NSW, served 1919–1948.
- In recognition of his benefactions, in 1927 the gallery's trustees commissioned his portrait by George Lambert.
- In 1932 he was presented with a gold medal by the Society of Artists, Sydney, for his services to Australian art.
- The 1933 student session of the Armidale Teachers' College presented to the college a bronze bust of Hinton by Rayner Hoff.
- The 1935-6 session of the Armidale Teachers' College commissioned a portrait of Hinton by Norman Carter.
- In 1935 he was awarded an Order of the British Empire.
- A Memorial Volume to Howard Hinton, Patron of Art was published after his death, praising his benefactions and listing individually the works given to both the Art Gallery of NSW and the Armidale Teachers' College.
- North Sydney Council established a plaque commemorating the site of Hinton's boarding house residence Hazelhurst as part of its Heritage Plaques Walk 4: Military Road to Cremorne Point.
