= Holden–Parramore Historic District =

Historic district in Florida, United States

- U.S. National Register of Historic Places
- U.S. Historic district
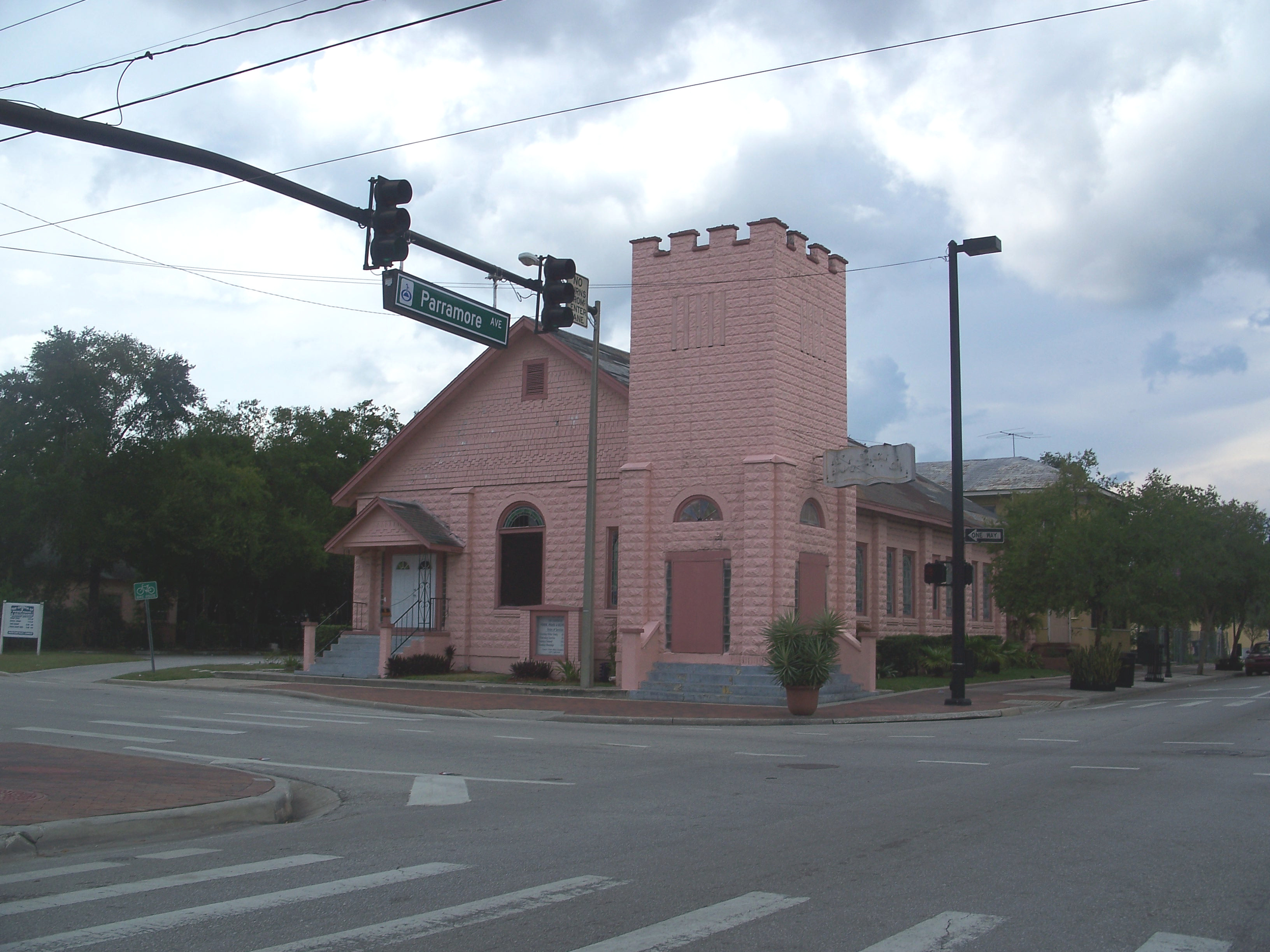
- Church in the district

- Location within Florida Location within the United States
- Location: Orlando, Florida
- Coordinates: 28°32′18″N 81°23′13″W
- Built: 1921
- NRHP reference No.: 09000746
- Added to NRHP: September 23, 2009

The Holden–Parramore Historic District is a U.S. historic district located in Parramore neighborhood of west-central Orlando, Florida. The district is roughly bounded by W. Church Street, S. Division Avenue, Long Street, McFall Avenue, and S. Parramore Avenue.

It was added to the National Register of Historic Places on September 23, 2009.
