= Vernon Treweeke =

Australian artist (1939–2015)

Vernon Treweeke (1939 – 19 March 2015) was an Australian psychedelic artist. He has been termed the "father of psychedelic art in Australia". In the late 1960s he was deemed to be "Australia's leading practitioner of abstract eroticism."

One of Vernon Treweeke's murals at Katoomba railway station, Blue Mountains Line

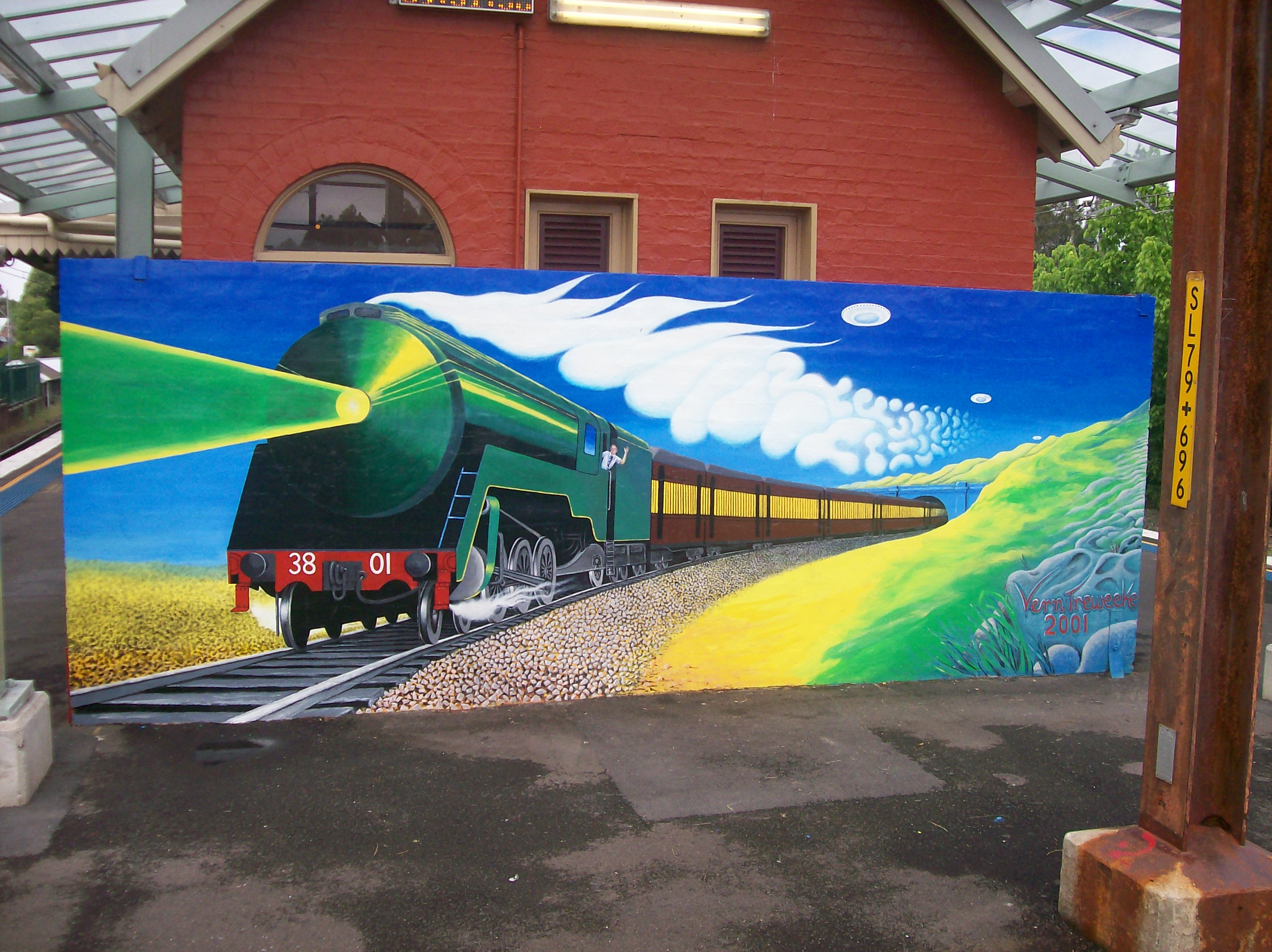
Vernon Treweeke's mural at Springood railway station, Blue Mountains Line

His work is held in various Australian and international collections, including the National Gallery of Australia and the National Gallery of Victoria.

== Early life ==
Treweeke grew up in Sydney, Australia. He attended boarding school at Scots School in Bathurst where he became a close friend of Brett Whiteley. From 1957 to 1959 he studied painting, drawing and sculpture at the Australian National Art School under John Passmore and Lyndon Dadswell. In 1961 he travelled to London via India and France. Whilst in London in 1962 he was included in the prestigious "Young Commonwealth Artists" exhibition that toured Germany, France and England. While in London he associated with many expatriate Australian artists including Michael Johnson, Tony McGillick and Wendy Paramor, and the English artists, David Hockney and Patrick Caulfield.

== Career ==
In 1966 Treweeke returned to Sydney via New York and San Francisco. In the late 1960s Treweeke regularly showed his work at Central Street Gallery in Sydney. His work of this time can be seen as developing a prototype for methods of exhibition practice that have subsequently become known as installation, multi-media and electronic art. A typical Treweeke exhibition during the Central Street years included silkscreen images on modular canvas panels coated in fluorescent paint, a sound component and then the whole space would be saturated in ultraviolet neon light.

By 1970 Treweeke had abandoned his increasingly high-profile career as an artist. His lifelong interest in beat culture; exotic religions and alternative lifestyles eventually led him to the town of Nimbin. In 1973 Treweeke was instrumental in organizing the Aquarius Festival.

Until his death in 2015, he lived in the Blue Mountains west of Sydney, where he painted murals on several of the stations on the Blue Mountains railway line, which feature elements of local folklore.

In 2003 a major exhibition of his work, the first in 30 years, was exhibited at Penrith Regional Gallery in Western Sydney.

In June 2010, an exhibition of his work was exhibited at CarriageWorks, centre for contemporary arts and culture, in Eveleigh, Sydney.

== Personal life ==
Treweeke had 5 children, including electronic musician Swift Treweeke, with whom he collaborated frequently, and virtuoso jazz pianist Luke Treweeke, whose mother was the artist Wendy Paramor. Treweeke died on 19 March 2015.
