= Parramore =

Human settlement in Orlando, Florida, United States of America

Coordinates: 28.5385°N 81.3889°W

Parramore is a neighborhood in west-central Orlando, Florida, United States. It is a historical neighborhood for Orlando residents of African descent, and suffered greatly during the Jim Crow era. In 2015, the unemployment rate was reported as 23.8% and median household income was $15,493.

The area was developed as a segregated African-American community. It was built in the 1880s by Orlando's fourteenth mayor, and Confederate soldier, James B. Parramore, as a development "to house the blacks employed in the households of white Orlandoans."

While the historic east border of Parramore was Division Avenue (which marked the line where African-American residents living in the west could not cross into the east after sundown), Interstate 4 was constructed directly between Parramore and the prosperous and mostly white neighborhoods of central downtown, just east of Division Avenue and just west of the railroad tracks. Parramore's "official" boundaries (according to the city of Orlando) extend to Interstate 4, but the regions in between Division and the interstate are generally not residential, hosting such facilities as the Kia Center and the Bob Carr Performing Arts Centre. Smaller businesses are located on the west side of Division Avenue and include grocery stores, barber shops, and soul food restaurants.

Many of the issues facing Parramore historically and currently can be traced to institutionalized or even unintentional neglect from the city and county governments, exacerbated by the fact that the city limits of Orlando do not extend all the way through, and therefore one block might be dependent on city services while being bordered on three sides by blocks that depend on county services. The western border of Parramore is Orange Blossom Trail, a thoroughfare where violence and other crimes are common.

Orlando officially considers Parramore to be three separate neighborhoods: Lake Dot (between Colonial Drive and Amelia Street), Callahan (between Amelia Street and Central Boulevard), and Holden/Parramore (between Central Boulevard and Gore Street). All three are bounded on the east by Interstate 4 and on the west by Orange Blossom Trail.

A soccer stadium, Inter.co Stadium, was built in Parramore along West Church Street between Glenn Lane and Terry Avenue.

== Libraries ==
In 1924, the Booker T. Washington Branch of the Albertson Public Library in downtown Orlando opened to serve Parramore and West Orlando at a time when the deeply segregated city did not welcome black residents into its main branch. The library was housed in the former rectory of St. John's Episcopal Church, and had two reading rooms and a collection of over 1,000 books.

The first head librarian, Eddie T. Jackson, was also the first black librarian in Orlando. Jackson was a member of the NAACP and the National Council of Negro Women and an Orange County school teacher for 34 years.

The Booker T. Washington Library continues today in its current location in the Lila Mitchell Community Center in the MetroWest neighborhood of west Orlando.

In recent years, the Little Free Library program has brought books into the Parramore community again. This national book exchange program began in 2009, and now has two dozen locations in Orlando, with several in the Parramore neighborhood. The small book depositories provide book borrowing for free, with the expectation that the borrower will return the book after reading. Donations of books are encouraged.

In the spring of 2013, a Little Free Library opened at 212 S. Parramore Avenue to provide residents with a free way to access and share literature. The library is sponsored by the Orlando City Soccer Club and New Image Youth Center.

In May 2021, Orlando Utilities Commission helped to open four new Little Free Libraries in Parramore. These are located at John H. Jackson Neighborhood Center, Mount Zion Missionary Baptist Church, Shiloh Baptist Church of Orlando, and the New Image Youth Center.
