= Gunter Christmann =

German-born Australian painter

- Born: 23 April 1936; Berlin, Nazi Germany
- Died: 19 November 2013 (aged 77)
- Known for: Painting, Sculpture, Sound Sculpture

Gunter Christmann (23 April 1936 – 19 November 2013) was a German-born Australian painter.

Born in Berlin, Christmann emigrated to Australia in 1959. Regarded as a painter's painter, Christmann has been making abstract and figurative paintings since the early 1960s and has exhibited frequently since 1965 throughout Australia and overseas. He has been labelled as one of the major Australian artists of his generation and 'one of Australia's best kept secrets' by art historian and curator Mary Eagle. Christmann rose to prominence with his inclusion in the landmark exhibition The Field at the National Gallery of Victoria in 1968. From his hard edged colourfield paintings of the 1960s he went on to produce the "sprinkle" paintings of the 1970s. Throughout his different phases Christmann has maintained a fascination with the world around him, feeding off contemporary life, with his more recent works incorporating a ‘'tag" graffiti style that is drawn across his paintings, sometimes in almost obsessive repetition.

== Exhibitions ==
Gunter Christmann started his career in the mid-1960s showing at Argus Gallery, Melbourne in 1965 and Central Street Gallery, Sydney in 1966. Since then he has held over 40 solo shows and participated in over 70 group exhibitions throughout Australia and overseas. Christmann has exhibited with many high-profile commercial galleries throughout his career, the longest-standing being Niagara Galleries, Melbourne with whom he has exhibited continuously since 1984. Historic moments in his career include his inclusion in The Field exhibition at the National Gallery of Victoria, as well as his participation in the XI Biennale of São Paulo, Brazil in 1971, and the First and Fourth Biennale of Sydney in 1973 and 1982. Christmann has participated in art fairs across Australia and New Zealand, most notably the Melbourne Art Fair in 2012 and the Auckland Art Fair in 2011. A posthumous retrospective of his life's work entitled Gunter Christmann: Now and Then was shown in 2014 at Heide Museum of Modern Art.

== Collections ==
Christmann's work is included in most major public collections in Australia, including extensive holdings in the National Gallery of Australia, Canberra and the National Gallery of Victoria and other state galleries. He is represented internationally in the collections of the Berlinische Galerie, Berlin, H.R.M. Queen Beatrix of the Netherlands' Collection and the British Museum, London and the Museum of Contemporary Art, Belgrade.
