= Norman Carter =

Australian painter (1875–1963)

Norman St Clair Carter (30 June 1875 – 18 September 1963) was an Australian painter, known particularly for murals and stained-glass designs.

== History ==
Carter was born in Kew, Melbourne and studied 1892–98 at the National Gallery School under Albert Tucker and Phillips Fox, and served an apprenticeship with a stained-glass maker. He moved to Sydney in 1903, and taught at the Royal Art Society of New South Wales, before joining Sydney Technical College in 1915 where he lectured until 1940. He was employed at Sydney University from 1922 to 1947, lecturing on architecture and history of art.

== Works ==
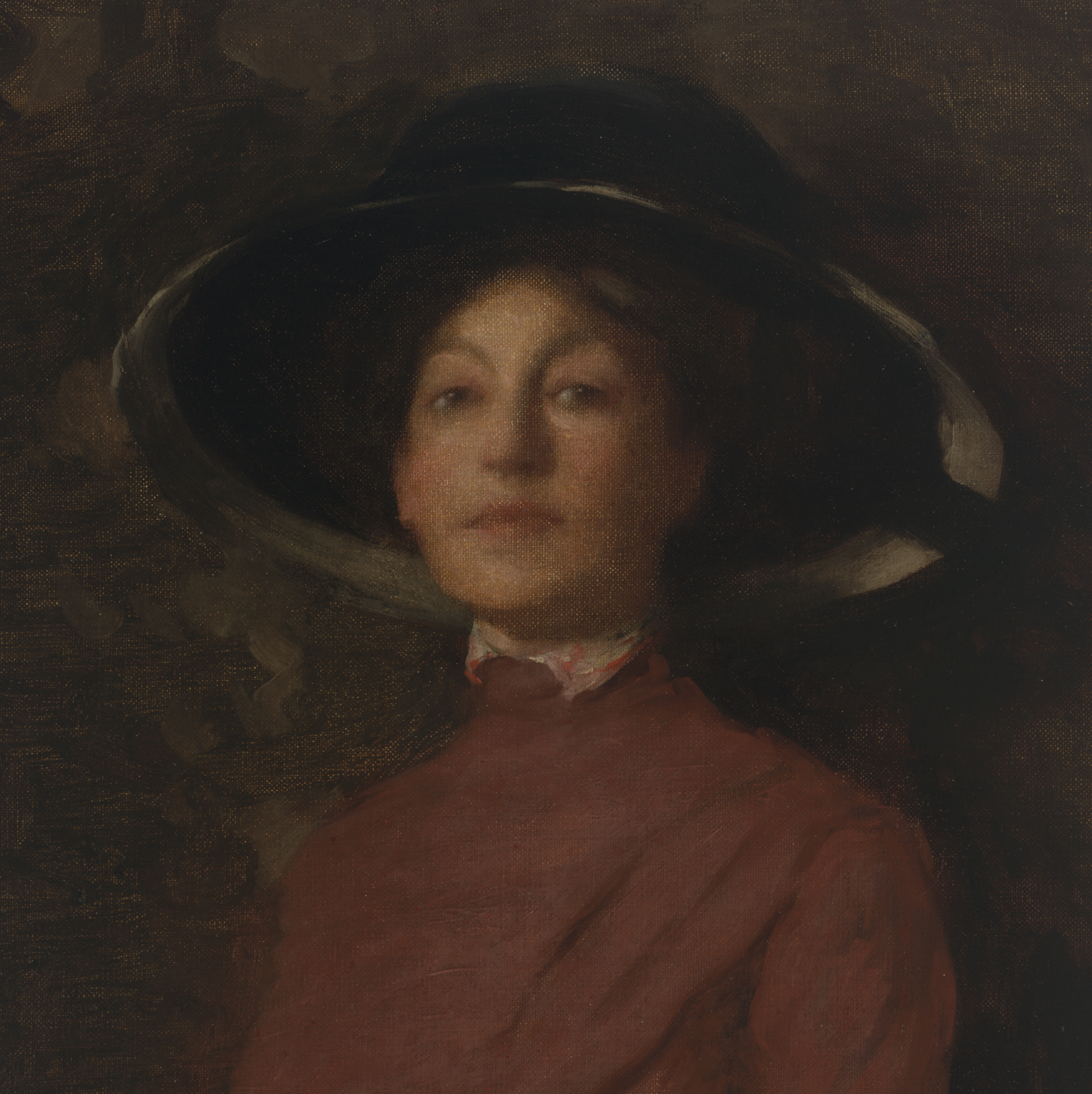
Portrait of Australian artist Florence Aline Rodway, 1910, (cropped), by Norman Carter

- He designed the windows for the chapel at Wesley College, Melbourne.
- He designed the four-light stained glass window of the "Warriors' Chapel", a screened-off space within St Andrew's Presbyterian Church at the corner of State Circle and Canberra Way, Forrest ACT. The chapel was a project of Rev. John Walker, whose five sons enlisted during the Great War of 1914–1918, three losing their lives in the conflict.
