= Makeba Wilbourn =

American psychologist and professor

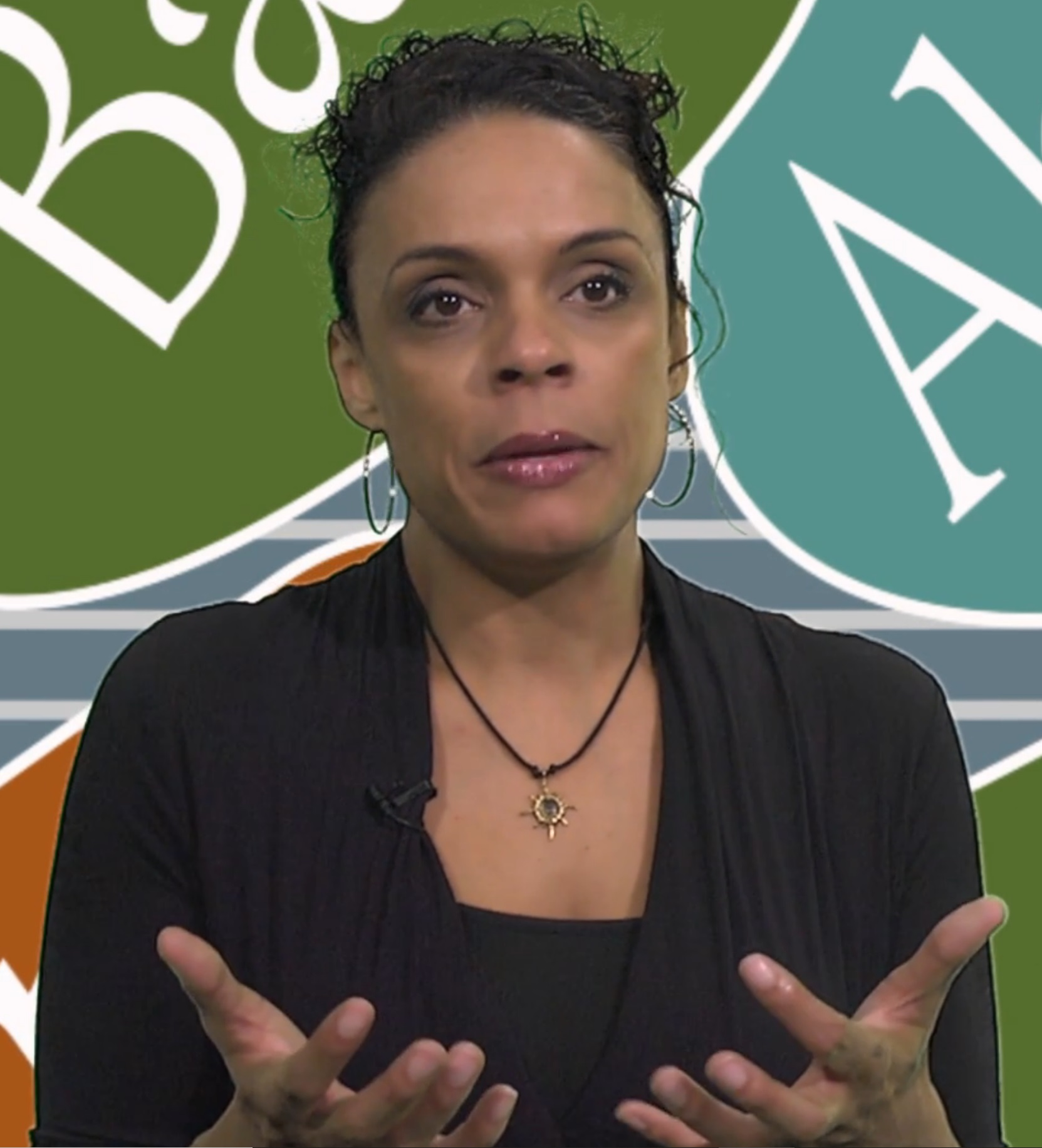
- Wilbourn on Ask a Scientist for the National Science Foundation in 2019
- Education: California State University, Fullerton; Cornell University
- Awards: PECASE (2016)
- Scientific career
- Institutions: Duke University
- Thesis: Understanding the perceptual and cognitive precursors to the acquisition of language: an examination of infants? Perception and use of manual gestures and signs (2007)

Makeba Parramore Wilbourn (born May 29, 1973) is an American developmental psychologist and professor at Duke University in the Department of Psychology and Neuroscience. She studies how children acquire knowledge. She was awarded the Presidential Early Career Award for Scientists and Engineers from President Barack Obama. This is the highest honor bestowed on early career scientists in the US.

== Early life and education ==
Wilbourn was born in Long Beach, California. She studied at the California State University, Fullerton, earning a bachelor's degree in 1997 and a master's degree in 2001. She was a State University of New York Minority Fellow at Cornell University between 2001 and 2003. She remained at Cornell University for her graduate studies, completing her PhD in developmental psychology in 2008. In 2006 she was awarded the Cornell University Provost's Diversity Fellowship. Her thesis considered language development and early-word learning. She studied how English-learning toddlers acquired new words. She joined Duke University in 2008.

== Research and career ==
Wilbourn studies how children learn language and how inputs such as gestures can impact cognitive development. At Duke University she runs WILD, the Wilbourn Infant Laboratory. They work closely with two nearby elementary schools studying culture, gesture and language. She is funded by a National Science Foundation CAREER Award which supports her exploration of how communication impacts the development of vocabulary. Wilbourn is interested in how race and socioeconomic status impact this development, with a focus on the black – white vocabulary gap. She worked with Allen Gottfried on the Fullerton Longitudinal Study, a program which monitors intellectual giftedness and the relationship with parental involvement and leadership development. She has studied the pointing gestures of infants, which can be used to develop early vocabulary. She found that the pointing gestures reflect a readiness to learn. She has also investigated Social Role Theory and children's gender stereotypes, finding that children were more restrictive for males who engaged in counterstereotypic roles.

Her work looks at at-risk students, in particular the language delayed and deaf, as well as autistic and African-American toddlers. She also investigates the relationship between thought and language in monolingual and bilingual children. She has discussed how language development may contribute to racial biases with Frank Stasio on WUNC. In 2017, she took part in the Kavli Frontiers of Science Japanese-American symposium. Wilbourn is involved with community outreach and mentoring programs, and offers summer internships for underrepresented students at Duke University.

=== Awards and honours ===
- 2003: Ford Foundation Fellowship
- 2009: California State University, Fullerton Outstanding Alumna of the Year
- 2010: Oak Ridge Associated Universities Ralph E. Powe Junior Faculty Enhancement Award
- 2012: International Reading Association Elva Knight Research Grant
- 2012: Center for Developmental Science Summer Mentored Grant Writing Award
- 2014: National Science Foundation Faculty Early Career Development Program
- 2016: Presidential Early Career Award for Scientists and Engineers
- 2020: National Science Foundation Research Experience for Undergraduates Award
- 2021: Dean's Award for Excellence in Graduate Student Mentoring - Duke University
- 2021: Academic Advisor of the Year - Duke University
