= Wendy Paramor =

Australian artist (1938–1975)

- Born: 12 December 1938; Melbourne, Australia
- Died: 28 November 1975 (aged 36); Woollahra, Australia
- Known for: Painting
- Movement: colour field abstraction
- Partner: Vernon Treweeke

Wendy Paramor (12 December 1938 – 28 November 1975) was an Australian artist. In 2014, the Paramor Prize was created by the Liverpool City Council.

== Early life and education ==
Paramor was born in Melbourne Victoria, on 12 December 1938.

After leaving school at the age of 15, she completed a secretarial course at her father's insistence before studying art at the East Sydney Technical College and Julian Ashton Art School.

== Career ==
Between 1960 and 1963, she lived in Europe, traveling and exhibiting work in Lisbon, London and New York City. While in Portugal, Paramor had solo exhibitions for three months on a grant from the Fundação Calouste Gulbenkian in Lisbon, Coimbra, and Porto. On her return to Sydney in 1963, she lived in a modest terrace house in Waterloo and exhibited in group shows with the Contemporary Art Society of Australia (Victoria and New South Wales), and at the Dominion, Barry Stern and Blaxland galleries in Sydney.

In 1965 she held critically-acclaimed solo exhibitions at Watters Gallery in Sydney, and Bognar Gallery in Los Angeles. In 1966 she moved to a property in West Hoxton, New South Wales, where she built a Philip Cox-designed underground house. From 1966 to 1970 she exhibited with the Central Street Gallery in Sydney, which confirmed her decisive move from landscape-based work to "hard edge," geometric abstraction. During this time she successfully expanded her practice into sculpture, and two of her sculptures and a painting were included in the seminal exhibition, 'The Field', which opened the National Gallery of Victoria's new building in 1968.

After being diagnosed with a brain tumour, she returned to figurative and semi-figurative work (landscapes, portraiture), and made plans for a large-scale metal sculpture exhibition.

== Recognition ==
In 2014, the Paramor prize was created by the Liverpool (Australia) City Council.

== Personal life ==
In October 1967, her son Luke was born. She never married his father, Vernon Treweeke, who was also a painter. In 1973, at the age of 34, Paramor was diagnosed with a brain tumour. She died on 28 November 1975 at the Wolper Jewish Hospital in Woollahra, Sydney, New South Wales.
