= Sandra Leveson =

- Born: 1944 (age 81–82); Melbourne, Australia
- Education: Caulfield Institute of Technology, National Gallery School
- Known for: Abstract painting, printmaking

Sandra Leveson (born 1944), also known as Sandra Leveson-Meares, is an Australian painter, printmaker, and teacher.

== Training ==
From 1959, aged fourteen, to 1963, Leveson studied design at Caulfield Institute of Technology where she and sculptor Ken Leveson met while he was taking fashion illustration. She continued studies at the National Gallery School 1959-63 and they married in 1966 and lived in Sandringham. Both taught at Brighton Technical College. In 1971 they were contemplating buying nineteenth-century mill near Castlemaine "for another environment to work in", but instead converted a warehouse into a studio-cum-townhouse at 4 Tyrone Street, South Yarra. She undertook overseas study in the UK and US in 1974 and 1976.

== Career and reception ==
=== Teacher ===
While resident at 23 Tennyson Street, Sandringham, where she was photographed in 1970 by Paul Cox (a lecturer at Prahran College) with her then husband Ken, Leveson taught printmaking at Brighton Technical College. From 1970 to 1982, she lectured in Fine Art at the Prahran College of Advanced Education where she was Head of printmaking 1972–1982. In Sydney, Prahran College graduate Carol Jerrems made a sequence of photographs of her in 1974 for A Book About Australia Women.

=== Artist ===
In the late mid-1960s Leveson adopted a geometric Op Art style in her early screen prints. Of these reviewer Patrick McCaughey wrote:

Good design wins out too often. These prints may contain intricacies but never real difficulties for the spectator. They do too much and make life much too easy with their bland matt colors. Pleasant enough and skilful in their decorative organisatiton, it's a pressure free art, demanding little and sustaining little. The exhibition, one suspects, hides a better artist than it reveals. The shaped polyptych upstairs promises a curtness awaiting future delivery.

Later works established her as a colourist when in 1968 they were shown at Pinacotheca Gallery, Melbourne, in a joint show Recent prints 18–29 November with Alan Warren. However, despite their adherence to the high Modernist colour field style and to geometric abstraction then ascendant, as Foster points out, Leveson's work, and Lesley Dumbrell's likewise, was not included amongst the predominantly male artists' in the 1968 The Field survey.

In 1971 Leveson started screen printing on her canvases. Ruth Faerber in 1972 confirmed the lyrical quality of her imagery:

Sandra Leveson uses an optical off-register dot pattern to create moire patterned surfaces in lyrical romantic color. Built up with a minute pointilistic technique, large silkscreen prints in editions, single canvases and double-sided glass images conjure up drifting recangular and diamond forms, structured by strongly contrasting stable and strict borders of flat color. Skill and sensitivity are superbly combined in works of restful elegance.

That emphasis led her American Abstract Expressionist-influenced works of the 1970s, and first seen in Sydney in 1972 at The Holdsworth Galleries, which in turn was adapted to her semi-abstract representation of expansive Australian landscape.

However McCaughey continued to regard Leveson's work of this period, shown at Realties at the end of 1972, as lightweight:

They make all the right moves for seriousness. I mean they've got "color spread", "optical displacement" and even some cautious shaped prints. But we've all been dragged round this track too often for the moves to come off. There's not a twitch we can't predict, except one's own aghast grimace.

Daniel Thomas pointed out in her 1974 show at Bonython the link between Leveson's screen printing, through the use of stencils, with her painting, describing the effect in her "Optic Series" as "like looking at a pale Rothko through a flyscreen." Thomas noted that she was then selling works at around $1,000. Leveson in interview said the effect was inspired on her overseas residencies during which she took photographs of mist and fog, "showing images behind a curtain, a natural haze."

Age reviewer Maureen Gilchrist summing up exhibitions of the year 1976 concluded that Leveson's at Realities gallery, with those of Lesley Dumbrell at Powell Street, were "the year's most compelling", her "large canvases, painted and then successively silkscreened with one of the dominant colors, achieves extraordinarily subtle effects of hovering, vibration and translucency. These lyrical works have such titles as Lesbos, evoking a female consiciousnses." In April, Gilchrist reviewed the survey of ten years of the artist's work held at Melbourne University, and remarked on its evolution and the influence of her overseas travel to see Noland, Rothko, Louis, Turner and Monet;

In the earlier screen prints and acrylics Leveson was involved with optics and with creating a simple, clearly defined, geometric regularity. Gradually she began to relinquish this approach and is now attempting a far more complex unity. In the new canvases she begins with a brushy, gestural spread of colors, usually applied centrally, and then successively screens one of the dominant colors over these, employing a silkscreen technique. The effect is a series of semitransparent veils [...] The effect is as fugitive as an apparition, but it is not amorphous. The silk-screened veil of dots acts as a regulating device, a grid, balancing the fluid, spontaneously brushed gestures of the hand.

Paul Taylor of the same retrospective also noted the synthesis of "juxtaposed gestural strokes with the screenprint grid and also ... the lyrical palette".

In April 1978 Leveson was invited onto a "Discussion Panel On Painting" at the Art Gallery of New South Wales in conjunction with the exhibition of a paintings there by John Walker, chaired by Patrick McCaughey, with David Aspden, Syd Ball, John Firth-Smith, Alun Leach-Jones and John Peart. Then in June that year joined in the symposium "Views on Recent Changes in Women's Art", with Janine Burke, Lesley Dumbrell, Helen Geier, Memory Holloway, Jenny Watson, Elizabeth Gower at Powell Street Gallery South Yarra. In 1987, Leveson was again invited to the AGNSW as a speaker in "Artists on Art", beside William Delafield Cook, Fred Cress, John Firth-Smith, Robert Jacks, Michael Johnson, Colin Lanceley, Terence Maloon on Hilarie Mais, Susan Norrie and Richard Dunn, Tim Storrier, Ann Thomson and John Wolseley for the Centre for the History of the Decorative Arts.

Also by 1978, Leveson had found a receptive market in Fort Worth, Texas, for Australian landscapes that looked familiar to Texans, exhibiting paintings and prints at Gallery One, later named William Campbell Contemporary Art.

Sasha Grishin, in 1978, reacted with a contrary view of her contributions at Susan Gillespie Galleries, Canberra: "Sandra Leveson's suite of four screenprints, 'Half Moon Bay' Nos 1 to 4, with its juxtaposition of photographic seascapes and soft pastel-like backgrounds, leads to nowhere and is executed with a professional slickness that leaves one uneasy." Likewise Robert Rooney, reviewing her contributions to a group show at Realities in early 1979 in The Age considered her lyricism as having been taken too far, with "gestures ... devoid of energy and her colors favor powder puff flesh and eye shadow. Fresh Water Plain has superimposed dot screens for added strength, but it doesn't come off. Not as good as her early stuff."

McCulloch in 2006 characterised her style as "coolly restrained abstracts, which are often characterised by pastel blues and pinks divided by a horizon-like line".

In 1980 after her second husband Russell Meares accepted a professorship in psychology at the University of Sydney, he and Leveson relocated from Melbourne to Sydney, converting a former chemical warehouse in Balmain for a large studio. However her Harbour-inspired imagery left reviewer Memory Holloway detecting no emotion and "one idea, one image which is flogged into submission: a tough and aggressive triangle", in over-simplified compositions in which "the eye is never enticed into the work, never arrested or caught in any visual tangle, but glides effortlessly over the slick surfaces without interruption". On her own work in 1987 Leveson remarked: "Basically I'm a romantic so I like that thing about the image being not quite there, fugitive, ephemeral."

== Exhibitions ==
=== Solo ===
Leveson achieved early recognition and from 1962, then aged 18, she commenced a series of solo shows, first in Melbourne's Pinacotheca, and Realities and later, Greythorn, and at Macquarie Galleries in Sydney. Others include:

- 1962, to 29 November: Sandra Leveson, Pinacotheca, St Kilda
- 1968, 18–29 November: Recent prints Joint show with Alan Warren. Pinacotheca
- 1970: Joint show, Strines Gallery, Cnr Rathdown & Faraday Sts., Carlton
- 1972, March: Holdsworth Art Gallery
- 1972, December: Realities, Toorak
- 1974, from 1 February: Sandra Leveson, paintings and prints and Gordon Andrews, jewellery and sculpture. Bonython Art Gallery, Sydney
- 1976: Realities Gallery, Toorak
- 1977, 26 April – 3 June: A Decade of Sandra Leveson, Melbourne University
- 1978, 4–18 August: Paper Works, with Peter Powditch, Powell Street Gallery
- 1978, 18 November – 8 December: First US exhibition, Gallery One, Fort Worth, Texas
- 1980, 29 March – 12 April: Sandra Leveson, New Paintings, Australia's Finest Contemporary Artist, Gallery One, Fort Worth, Texas
- 1980, to 24 December: Prints by Sandra Leveson, Axiom Gallery, Richmond
- 1982, 5–26 November: Recent paintings and works on paper by Sandra Leveson Meares. Realities gallery, Toorak
- 1983, 7 May – 18 June: Sandra Leveson-Meares, Gallery One, Fort Worth, Texas
- 1985, 5–23 February: Sandra Leveson-Meares - Gouaches, Macquarie Galleries, Sydney
- 1985, 22 October – 6 November: Paintings by Sandra Leveson-Meares, William Campbell Contemporary Art, Fort Worth, Texas
- 1987, 4–22 August: Recent Paintings by Sandra Leveson, Macquarie Galleries, Sydney
- 1989, 18 March–8 April: Sandra Leveson : Recent Paintings, Macquarie Galleries, Sydney
- 1991: Exhibition of works by Sandra Leveson and David Van Nunen from the 1990 Artists' Camp organised by the Museums and Art Galleries of the Northern Territory
- 1991, 12 October – 16 November: Australian painter Sandra Leveson, William Campbell Contemporary Art, Fort Worth, Texas
- 1994, to 8 January: Sandra Leveson 30 Year Survey, Campbelltown City Art Gallery
- 1994: New England Regional Art Museum with a tour of regional galleries
- 1994, December–January: William Campbell Contemporary Art, Fort Worth, Texas
- 1994–95, 2 December to 22 January: Sandra Leveson 30 Year Survey, Campbelltown City Art Gallery
- 1995: Wagga Wagga City Art Gallery
- 1995, June: Sandra Leveson : Impressions of the Landscape, Greythorn Galleries, Toorak
- 1996: A Decade of Sandra Leveson 1986-1996, BMG Art Gallery, Adelaide
- 2011: Sandra Leveson : painting of poise and passion, TarraWarra Museum of Art
- 2015: Sandra Leveson : painting of poise and passion, Macquarie University. Art Gallery

=== Group ===
- 1971: A Decade of Australian Painting, McClelland Gallery 1971
- 1973: Georges Invitation Art Prize
- 1975, 26–28 November: Artists For Labor And Democracy : An exhibition of paintings, sculptures, prints, drawings and photographs. Ian Armstrong, Asher Bilu, Jack Courier, Peter Campbell, Liz Cross, Peter Corlett, Noel Counihan, Peter Cole, Joan Coxsedge, Lesley Dumbrell, John Davis, Neil Douglas, John Hopkins, Geoff Lowe, Vlase Nikoleski, Gareth Sanson, Ivan Durrant, Dale Hickey, Kevin Lincoln, Keith Nicholl, John Scurry, Len French, Mary Hammond, Sandra Leveson, John Neeson, Andrew Sibley, Anita Furey, George Johnson, Alun Leach Jones, Ailsa O'Conner, Douglas Stubbs, Mike Field, Martin Jones, Donald Laycock, Chris Pyett, Max Thompson, Bob Grieve, Robert Jacks, Danny Moynahan, Laurie Peterson, Andrew Maclean, Craig Gough, Inge King, Ted May, Cliff Pugh, Jennifer Talbot, Geoff LaGerche, Grahame King, Vic Majzner, Lenton Parr, Edith Wall, Bill Gregory, Les Kossatz, Clive Murray-White, Richard Rudd, David Wilson, Helen Geir, Bill Kelly, Jeff Makin, Sweeney Reed, Patrick Geir, Roger Kemp, Erica McGilchrist, and others, at Toorak Art Gallery
- 1977, 29–31 January: Brighton City Cultural Centre opening exhibition, with Roger Kemp, Gary Shead, John Howley and others, Halifax St., Middle Brighton
- 1978, May: Prahran College Staff exhibition, Roger Kemp. Vic Majzner, David Wilson, Sandra Leveson, Helen Geier, Jeff Makin and others
- 1978, 29 July – 8 August: David Aspden, John Firth Smith. Sandra Leveson, Peter Powditch. Powell Street Gallery, Sth Yarra
- 1978, 12–22 December: Works on paper with Barbara Campbell, Sandra Leveson, Kate Briscoe, Jenny Watson and Mandy Martin. Susan Gillespie Galleries, Manuka
- 1979, March: Frank Hodgkinson, Don Laycock, John Wolseley, Roger Kemp, Asher Bilu, Dinny Nolan Tjampitjinpa, David Rankin, Lloyd Rees, Realities gallery Toorak
- 1979, September: Contemporary prints and paintings including artists Miro, Leroy Neiman, Jim Dine, Folon, Gene Davis, Bruno Bruni, Victor Vasarely, Sandra Leveson, Will Barnet and R. C. Gorman. Gallery One, Fort Worth, Texas, USA
- 1982, from September 1982 – February 1985: Australian Screenprints, with Ray Arnold, Sydney Ball, John Coburn, Bruce Latimer, Alun Leach-Jones, Mandy Martin, Greg Moncrieff, Ann Newmarch, Sally Robinson, David Rose, Stephen Spurrier, Arthur Wicks, Norman Wight and Paul Zika. Starting Institute of Modern Art, Brisbane and touring 21 state and regional galleries throughout Australia
- 1986, April: ArtWalk '86, with Dan Allison, Jack Boynton, Michel Demanche, Ken Dixon, Peter Dean, Dorothy Gillespie, A.M. Hudson, Val Hunnicutt, Doug Hill, Nancy Lamb, Sandra Leveson-Meares, Larry Millar, David McCullough, Richard Thompson, Cecil Touchon, Karl Umlauf and Sara Waters. William Campbell Contemporary Art, Fort Worth, Texas
- 1986, 15 August – 21 September: Original prints of the 70s by Syd Ball, John Coburn, Sandra Leveson and Martin Sharp. Lake Macquarie Gallery, Old Council Chambers, Speers Point, Lake Macquarie.
- 1987, 18 September – 17 October: Gallery artists, William Campbell Contemporary Art, Fort Worth, Texas
- 1988, to 16 January: Gallery artists, including work by Michael Johnson, Fred Cress, John Coburn, Sandra Leveson, John Beard, Bernard Ollis and others, Macquarie Galleries
- 1988, to 17 July Contemporary views of New England with works by Cressida Campbell, Sandra Leveson, Max Miller, Angus Nivison, Ann Thomson and Guy Warren. New England Regional gallery, Armidale
- 1988: Aspects of Australian Art, Houston International Festival exhibition, Houston, 1988
- 1988: Contemporary views of New England : Cressida Campbell, Sandra Leveson, Max Miller, Angus Nivison, Ann Thomson, Guy Warren
- 1991, August: Gallery artists, William Campbell Contemporary Art, Fort Worth, Texas
- 1994, to 18 May: Prints and Etchings by Michael Leunig, John Spooner, Anita Lawrence, Sandra Leveson and Louis Kahan, Avant Garden, 46 Vincent St, Daylesford.
- 1994, 12–30 November: Prints by Frank Hodgkinson, Sandra Leveson. Jeff Makin, Graeme Peebles, David Rankin. Distelfink, 432 Burwood Rd Hawthorn
- 1995, 15–16 July: Works from Australian Galleries artists, 5th International Works on Paper Fair, Sydney
- 1995, July: Limited edition prints by Lin Onus, Frank Hodgkinson, Graeme Peebles, Sandra Leveson, Gallery 130, 130 Flinders St, Melbourne
- 1996, from 19 January: It's a Guitar Shaped World Two, Tamworth Country Music Festival exhibition, Tamworth City Gallery
- 1996, April: Original prints by Jan Neil, Clem Millward, Sandra Leveson and David Rose, Steven Print, 259 Victoria St. Abbotsford
- 1998, to 31 March: Summer Exhibition; Paintings by Prominent Australian Artists, Wagner Art Gallery, 39 Gurner St, Paddington
- 1998, 8 October: Recent paintings by Sandra Leveson, Greythom, 462 Toorak Rd, Toorak
- 2000, 26 October–12 November: New Works: Paintings By Sandra Leveson, Greythorn Galleries, 462 Toorak Rd, Toorak
- 2000, 9–23 December: Christmas Exhibition, Contemporary paintings by leading Australian artists including: Albert Tucker, Arthur Boyd, Charles Blackman, David Boyd, David Aspen, Judy Cassab, John Coburn, Ray Crooke, Robert Dickerson, Geoff Dyer, Donald Friend, William Boissevain, Frank Hodgkinson, Robert Juniper, Louis Kahan, Sandra Leveson! Leonard Long, Sidney Nolan, John Olsen, John Perceval, John Rigby, Susan Sheridan, Brett Whitely & Margaret Woodward. Wagner Art Gallery, 39 Gurner St, Paddington
- 2001, 8–31 March: Australian Women Artists: Hermia Boyd, Celia Perceval, Sandra Leveson. Elizabeth Durack, Eveline Syme, Janet Cumbrae-Stewart, Barbara Tribe. Vanessa Wood Fine Art, Mosman
- 2001, 5–30 April: Autumn Collection, Fred Cress; Brett Whiteley; Sidney Long; Robert Dickerson; Arthur Boyd; Jason Cordero; David Boyd; Sandra Leveson: Frances Fussell; Elizabeth Durack; Celia Perceval; Hermia Boyd; John Firth-Smith; Charles Blackman; John Coburn; Harry Bilson; J.J. Hilder; Sir Ivor Hele; Thomas Gleghorn; Scott McDougall. Vanessa Wood Fine Art, Mosman
- 2001, 26 October – 25 November: Portia Geach Memorial Award, Julianne Mills, Yuri Shimmyo, Sandra Leveson, National Trust, S. H. Ervin Gallery, The Rocks, Sydney
- 2012, 5 April to 3 May: Less is more – more or less, with George Baker, Malcolm Benham, Virginia Coventry, Elizabeth Cummings, Margaret Dredge, Ruth Faerber, Vivienne Ferguson, Victor Greenaway, Steve Harrison, Anna Herold Pola, Jenny Herbert-Smith, David Horton, Melanie Howard, Tim Maguire, Frank Marinelli, Russell McQuilty, Miranda Parkes, Robyn Quinn, Peggy Randall, Jai Smith, Carly Snoswell, Daniel Templeman, Aida Tomescu, Shoalhaven City Arts Centre
- 2013: Great and Small, Yvonne Boag, Ian Grant, Sandra Leveson, Alan Oldfield, Eric Smith, Anita Taylor, Ken Woolley; Pinson Gallery at Syndicate at Danks, Sydney

== Awards and commissions ==
- 1971: 1971 Corio Painting Prize, Geelong Art Gallery
- 1972: Alice Prize, Painting Prize, Northern Territory Art Gallery
- 1972: Trustees Award, Queensland Art Gallery
- 1975: Trustees Purchase Award, Tasmanian Art Gallery & Museum
- 1978: Commissioned Patron Print for Australian Print Council
- 1978: Transporting Art, painted trams, Victorian Arts Board

== Collections ==
- National Gallery of Australia
- Art Gallery of New South Wales
- Art Gallery of South Australia
- Museum and Art Gallery of the Northern Territory: MAGNT
- National Gallery of Victoria
- Queensland Art Gallery
- Tasmanian Museum and Art Gallery (TMAG)
- Parliament House
- Artbank
- International Convention Centre Sydney
- Geelong Art Gallery
- Newcastle Art Gallery
- University of Melbourne
- University of Western Australia
- M.G. Dingle and G.B. Hughes Collection, Shoalhaven City Arts Centre
