= The Field (exhibition) =

Influential Australian exhibition of abstract art held in 1968

Coordinates: 37.8226°S 144.9689°E

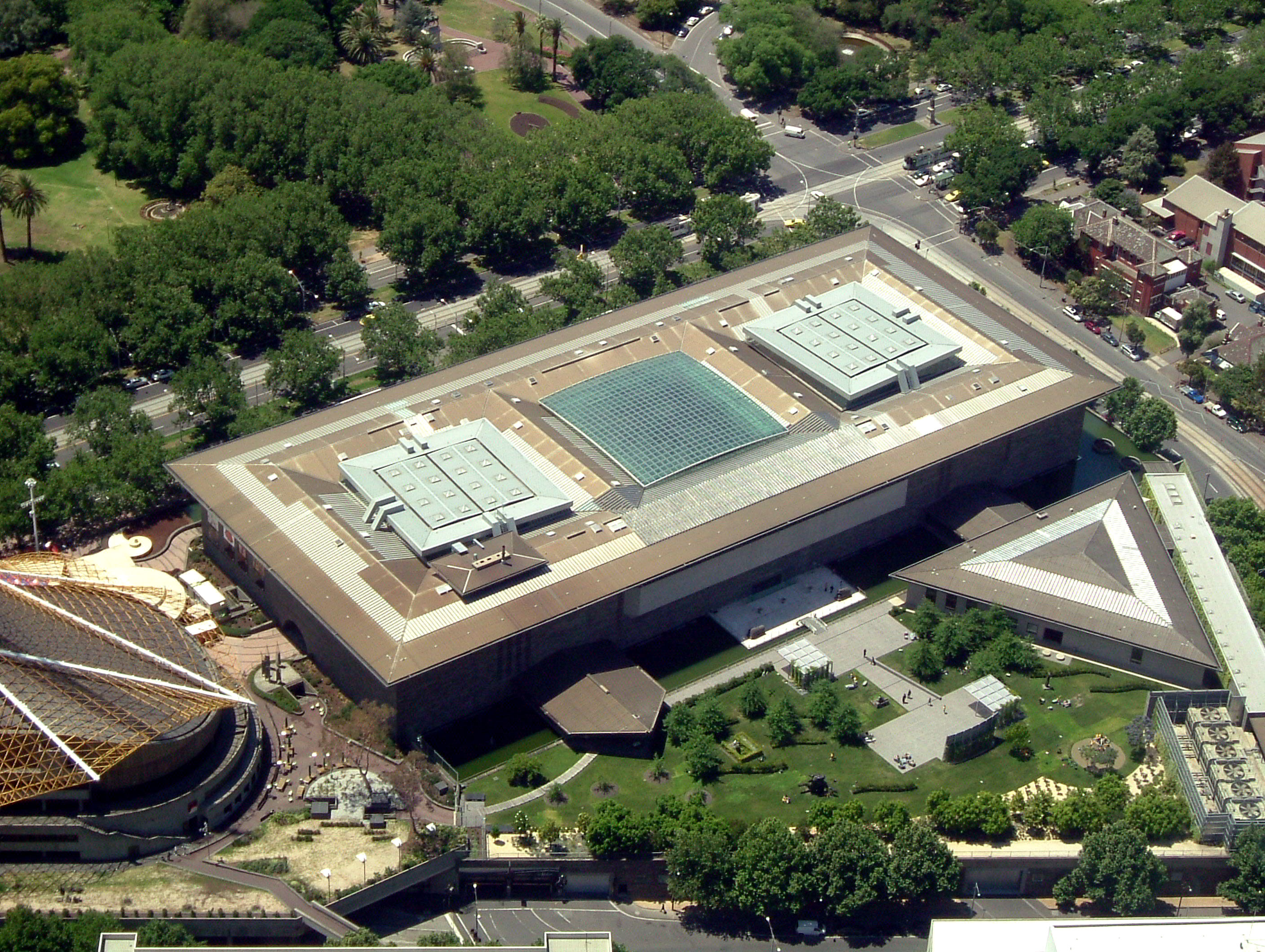
National Gallery of Victoria from Eureka Tower

The Field was the inaugural exhibition at the National Gallery of Victoria’s new premises on St Kilda Road, Melbourne. Launched by the director of London’s Tate gallery, Norman Reid, before an audience of 1,000 invitees, it was held between held 21 August and 28 September 1968. Hailed then, and regarded since as a landmark exhibition in Australian art history, it presented the first comprehensive display of colour field painting and abstract sculpture in the country in a radical presentation, between silver foil–covered walls and under geometric light fittings, of 74 works by 40 artists. All practised hard-edge, geometric, colour and flat abstraction, often in novel media including coloured or transparent plastic, fluorescent acrylic paints, steel and chrome. The art was appropriate to a launch of the new venue itself, designed by architect Roy Grounds, and emphatically rectilinear; cubes nested in a basalt rectangular box amongst the other buildings of the new Arts Centre, each based on a geometric solid. Echoing emerging international stylistic tendencies of the time, The Field sparked immediate controversy and launched the careers of a new generation of Australian artists.

== The curators ==
Director of the NGV, the English curator Eric Westbrook, was determined to have the new gallery engage with contemporary art and accessible to broader audiences, and he supported curators of the exhibition John Stringer, Exhibitions Officer, and Brian Finemore, Curator of Australian Art, in their aim to showcase contemporary Australian art not previously seen in major institutions, but which had been emerging in a few commercial galleries, and in which the artists reflected an international tendency. It was intended to be the first of a series of exhibitions presenting aspects of contemporary Australian art. The working title had been Conceptual Abstraction, characterising the style of many of the works, but it was changed to The Field (a double-entendre joining Greenbergian flatness with racetrack associations) at the suggestion of Rollin Schlicht, one of the exhibitors.

== Emphasis ==
The curators acknowledged their bias towards a particular form of abstraction; they included neither artists with established reputations, such as those of the nationalist, or arguably provincial, movements culminating in the 1959 Antipodean Manifesto and exhibition, nor the concurrently practicing expressionist abstractionists John Olsen, Leonard French or Roger Kemp. Gary Catalano notes;

"The Antipodean exhibition, whatever its immediate purpose, formed a high-water mark in Australia's sense of confidence in the potential of its society, yet beyond that trail of salt and broken shells The Field was an emphatic rejection, if not of such confidence, then at least of the idea that art should be its vehicle and its voice."

Instead, the emphasis was on internationalism, especially the influence of contemporary movements in American art, of which Sydney Ball, Ian Burn, Clement Meadmore and Mel Ramsden had direct experience, alongside James Doolin, a visiting American who via his teaching in Sydney and Melbourne, introduced many, particularly Robert Jacks, Dale Hickey, Robert Hunter and Robert Rooney to the hard-edge, colour field, minimal and geometric styles.

The exhibition followed the visit to Melbourne made during the UNESCO critic's seminar by Britain's Al Alvarez and New York art critic Clement Greenberg. The latter identified and promoted Colour Field painting, and while in Melbourne judged the 1968 Georges Invitation Art Prize awarding it to Sydney Ball (who between 1963 and 1965 had been living in New York) for his colour field painting, thus legitimising the work of contemporary Australian abstraction.

Australian artists included in The Field were practising in this style prior to 1968, some having no overseas experience. Stringer had worked as consulting curator for the Museum of Modern Art (MoMA), New York, travelling exhibition Two Decades of American Painting, which opened at the NGV in 1967. As the first large-scale survey of contemporary American art, including abstraction by Josef Albers, Ad Reinhardt and Mark Rothko, it was an important influence on 1960s Australian art. Critic James Gleeson however, denied that the artists in The Field were exercising 'conscious imitation of specifically American attitudes, but that while Two Decades of American Painting provided an additional stimulus, 'the revolution in Australia had already begun.' It was a 'clear and unequivocal announcement that a large number of Australian painters had accepted the notion that art should be non-expressive and uncommunicative,' promoted 'long before...by galleries like Central Street and Gallery A' [and Pinacotheca, then in St Kilda, which concurrently with the NGV show advertised 'for viewing' 15 of The Field artists in its stockroom alongside a solo by Rollin Schlicht].The Field, being at the NGV, Gleeson emphasised, simply brought much wider attention to revolutionary young artists sought out while still in art school by curators who were obliged to ‘show what is happening at the spearhead of art.’

In parallel, there were Canadian influences on the work of Jack and Hunter (residing in Canada at the time work was selected and who freighted their paintings into Australia), and British and European influences also amongst several exhibitors born in, or who had travelled to, Europe and the United Kingdom, such as Janet Dawson, one of only three women in The Field, who was exposed to School of Paris, Art Povera and Tachiste abstraction during residencies in Paris and Italy in 1959-60.

== Reception ==
Gleeson, in summing up the year, proclaimed; "As far as art is concerned, 1968 will be chiefly remembered as the year of the Field Exhibition." That the exhibition was held a public institution, the National Gallery of Victoria, led critics and commentators to react to it as an augury of the future of Australian art and of national identity. For some it was seen as a threat; especially Herald newspaper critic Alan McCulloch, supporter of many of the Antipodean group, who condemned it as ephemeral, a "wholesale imitation of another country’s abstract art", and "a serious threat to the emerging creative spirit which during the last fifteen years has been given distinct and promising identity to Australian painting." Influential as a critic and as author of The Encyclopedia of Australian Art, released in the same year as The Field, McCulloch continued to condemn the styles the show represented. Dealer Rudy Komon and sculptor Norma Redpath delivered scathing assessments of the show on opening night, and artists Clifton Pugh and Albert Tucker criticised the exhibition for its 'internationalism’ on broadcast television. Defenders included art patron John Reed, director of the gallery styled, after MoMA, the ‘Museum of Contemporary Art Australia’, and also writers of The Field catalogue Elwyn Lynn, and Age newspaper critic (and later, from 1981, Director of the NGV) Patrick McCaughey who announced the show ‘a new direction’, in his essay 'The significance of The Field published in Art & Australia in December 1968, and as suggesting different conventions, beliefs and pre-suppositions about the nature of the work of art and the role of Australian artists.

== The artists ==
Selected for exhibition were forty artists then working in a flat, abstract, patterned, geometric or colour field style. Nine were under 30, and many had yet to have a solo show. Their youth and lack of experience annoyed some established artists, and their devotion to international styles raised fears for the saleability of 'genuine' Australian art. The three women artists are shown in rows coloured yellow in the table:

Artist	Life dates	Artwork/s shown in The Field	Age in 1968
David Aspden	England 1935-Australia 2005, Australia from 1950	Field 1, 1968, synthetic polymer paint on canvas, 245.0 x 152.5 cm. Private collection, Brisbane	33
David Aspden	England 1935-Australia 2005, Australia from 1950	Fifth force, 1968, synthetic polymer paint on canvas, 167.6 x 602.0 cm, Transfield Holdings, Sydney	33
Sydney Ball	Australia 1933-2017	lspahan, 1967, synthetic polymer paint on canvas, 182.8 x 341.0 cm, University of Western Australia Art Collection, Gift of Dr Albert Gild, 1969	35
Sydney Ball	Australia 1933-2017	Transoxiana, 1968, synthetic polymer paint on canvas, 203.2 x 145.1 cm, Transfield Holdings, Sydney	35
Sydney Ball	Australia 1933-2017	Zanzan, 1968, synthetic polymer paint on canvas, 188.5 x 158.0 cm. Collection unknown	35
Tony Bishop	Australia born 1940	Short & curvy 1968, painted wood, 187.0 x 126.7 x 47.3 cm, Latrobe Regional Gallery, Morwell. Donated 1978 (1978.27)	28
Tony Bishop	Australia born 1940	Clik-clak-clik, 1968, painted steel, 400 x 85.0 x 100.0 cm, Newcastle Art Gallery, Newcastle. Gift of the artist through the Australian Government's Cultural Gifts Program 2002, (2002.024)	28
Peter Booth	England born 1940, Australia from 1968	Untitled, 1968, painted plywood, 196.8 cm (height). Collection unknown	28
Ian Burn	Australia 1939-93, United States 1967-77	Two glass/Mirror piece, 1968, mirror, glass, wood, 94.0 x 63.5 cm. Private collection, Brisbane	27
Ian Burn	Australia 1939-93, United States 1967-77	Four glass/Mirror piece, 1968, mirror, glass, wood, 93.8 x 63.1 cm. National Gallery of Victoria, Melbourne, purchased through the NGV Foundation with the assistance of the Rudy Koman Fund, Governor, 2001 (2001.559.a)	27
Gunter Christmann	Germany born 1936-Australia 2013, Australia from 1959	Untitled, 1968, painted steel, 111.8 cm (height). Collection unknown	32
Gunter Christmann	Germany born 1936-Australia 2013, Australia from 1959	Rubezahl, 1967, synthetic polymer paint polyvinyl acetate on canvas, 168.0 x 168.0 cm. Collection of Tilly and Jimmy Nuttall, Melbourne, canvas reused by the artist, currently exists on reverse of another painting, Canberra, 1975	32
Tony Coleing	Australia born 1942, England 1963-1968	Untitled, 1968, transparent synthetic polymer resin, 121.9 x 35.0 x 182.5 cm (variable). Private collection, Brlsbane	26
Tony Coleing	Australia born 1942, England 1963-1968	Untitled, 1968, aluminium, 269.2 x 1250.0 x 1000.0 cm (variable). Collection of the artist	26
Tony Coleing	Australia born 1942, England 1963-1968	Untitled, 1968, poles remade 2017, transparent synthetic polymer resin, aluminium, metal, (a-f) 506.5 x 760,0 x 290,0 cm (installation). Private collection, Brlsbane	26
Janet Dawson	Australia born 1935	Wall 11, 1968–69, synthetic polymer paint on canvas, 184.3 x 184.4 cm. National Gallery of Australia, Canberra. Purchased, 1969 (69.88)	34
Janet Dawson	Australia born 1935	Rollascape 2, 1968, synthetic polymer paint on composition board, 150.0 x 275.0 cm irreg. Art Gallery of Ballarat, Ballarat. Purchased with the assistance of the Visual Arts/Craft Board, Australia Council, 1988 (1998.2)	34
James Doolin	United States 1932-2002, Australia 1965-67	Artificial landscape 67·5, 1967, synthetic polymer paint on canvas, 129.6 x 101.8 cm. National Gallery of Victoria, Melbourne, Purchased, 1969 (87·6)	36
James Doolin	United States 1932-2002, Australia 1965-67	Artificial landscape 67·6, 1967, synthetic polymer paint on canvas, 184.0 x 136.0 cm. National Gallery of Australia, Canberra. Purchased, 1969 (69.86)	36
James Doolin	United States 1932-2002, Australia 1965-67	Artificial landscape 68-1, 1968, synthetic polymer paint on canvas, 166.7 x 132.4 cm. Art Gallery of New South Wales, Sydney. Gift of Chandler Coventry, 1972 (8.1972)	36
Noel Dunn	Australia born 1933, England and Europe 1961-65	Untitled, 1967, painted steel, 90.8 cm (height). Collection unknown	35
Noel Dunn	Australia born 1933, England and Europe 1961-65	Untitled, 1968, painted plywood, 196.8 cm (height). Collection unknown	35
Noel Dunn	Australia born 1933, England and Europe 1961-65	Untitled, 1968, painted steel, 111.8 cm (height). Collection unknown	35
Garrey Foulkes	Australia born 1944	Untitled 1968, remade 2017, synthetic polymer paint on canvas, 182.9 x 274.3 cm. Collection of the artist, Queensland	24
Dale Hickey	Australia born 1937	Malvern, 1967, synthetic polymer paint on canvas, 183.5 x 176.8 cm. La Trobe University, FM Courtis Collection. Accessioned from the artist between 1969 and 1974 (LTUC118)	31
Dale Hickey	Australia born 1937	Untitled 1967, oil on canvas, (a-b) 185.0 x 371.0 cm (overall). Queensland Art Gallery, Brisbane. Purchased 1993 (1993.047a-b)	31
Robert Hunter	Australia 1947-2014	Untitled, 1968, synthetic polymer paint and cotton thread on canvas, 215.0 x 215.0 cm. National Gallery of Australia, Canberra. Purchased, 1968 (69.146)	21
Robert Jacks	Australia 1943-2014	Red painting, 1968, oil on canvas, 176.0 x 238.0 cm. TarraWarra Museum of Art collection, Tarrawarra. Gift of Eva Besen AO and Marc Besen AO, 2001, (2002.040)	25
Michael Johnson	Australia born 1938, England 1960-67, United States 1969-75	Chomp, 1966, polyvinyl acetate on canvas, 122.0 x 305.5 cm. Private collection, Brisbane	30
Michael Johnson	Australia born 1938, England 1960-67, United States 1969-75	Frontal 2, 1968, synthetic polymer paint on canvas, 198.5 x 214.0 cm. Art Gallery of New South Wales, Sydney, Gift of Michael and Margot Johnson, 2000, (88.2000)	30
Col Jordan	Australia born 1935	Daedalus - series 5 (Redux), 1968, (remade 2017), synthetic polymer paint on canvas, 167.6 x 335.3 cm. Collection of the artist, Sydney	34
Col Jordan	Australia born 1935	Daedalus - series 6, 1968, synthetic polymer paint on canvas, 164.0 x 170.0 cm. National Gallery of Australia, Canberra. Purchased, 1969 (69.89)	34
Col Jordan	Australia born 1935	Knossus II (Redux), 1968, (remade 2017), synthetic polymer paint on wood, aluminium, steel, 104.0 x 231.0 x 162.0 cm, Collection of the artist, Sydney	34
Michael Kitching	England born 1940, Australia from 1952	Phoenix II, 1966, aluminium and transparent synthetic polymer resin, 204.0 x 120.0 x 80.0 cm. Mildura Art Centre Collection, Mildura, B.P. acquisition award, Mildura Prize for Sculpture, 1967 (67/2)	38
Alun Leach-Jones	England born 1937, Australia from 1960	Noumenon XX first light, 1967, synthetic polymer paint on canvas, 137.2 x 137.2 cm. Macquarie University Art Collection, Sydney. Gift of the artist, 1978 (MUACA1978/16/1)	31
Alun Leach-Jones	England born 1937, Australia from 1960	Noumenon XIX Indian Summer, 1967, synthetic polymer paint on canvas, 137.2 x 137.2 cm. Private collection, Mornington	31
Nigel Lendon	Australia born 1944	Slab construction 11, 1968, synthetic polymer paint on plywood, 131.0 x 76.5 x 70.0 cm. Queensland Art Gallery, Brisbane. Purchased 1994 (1994.124)	24
Nigel Lendon	Australia born 1944	Krinhilde, 1967, synthetic polymer paint polyvinyl acetate on canvas, 223.8 x 168.0 cm. Collection unknown, canvas believed to have been reused by the artist	24
Nigel Lendon	Australia born 1944	untitled structure 68-1, 1968, enamel on plywood, ultraviolet light, 182.9 cm (height). Destroyed.	24
Tony McGillick	Australia 1941-92, Europe 1960-65	Polaris 1968, synthetic polymer paint on canvas 236.0 x 218.5 cm, collection unknown	27
Tony McGillick	Australia 1941-92, Europe 1960-65	Arbitrator, 1968, synthetic polymer paint on canvas, (a-d) 287.0 x 406.0 cm irreg. (overall). Queensland Art Gallery, Brisbane. Purchased 2007 with funds from the Estate of Vincent Stack through the Queensland Art Gallery Foundation (2007.220a-d)	27
Clement Meadmore	Australia 1929- United States 2005, United States from 1963	Curl,1968, steel, ed. 2/4, 38.0 x 76.0 x 35.5 cm. Collection unknown	39
Clement Meadmore	Australia 1929- United States 2005, United States from 1963	Wave, 1968, steel, ed. 2/4, 29.0 x 29.0 x 66.0 cm, Collection unknown	39
Clement Meadmore	Australia 1929- United States 2005, United States from 1963	Up and over, 1967, painted steel, 31.0 x 40.7 x 60.1 cm. National Gallery of Australia, Canberra. Purchased, 1969 (69.102)	39
Michael Nicholson	England born 1916, New Zealand 1955-60, Australia 1960-86, New Zealand from 1986	1.6/66x3, 1966, aluminium and concrete, 313.5 x 99.0 x 43.5 cm, Collection unknown	52
Harald Noritis	Latvia born 1927, Australia from 1951	Come away, 1968, synthetic polymer paint on canvas, 152 x 193cm. National Gallery of Australia, Canberra. Gift of the artist, 1993 (93.1195)	41
Alan Oldfield	Australia 1943-2004	Mezzanine, 1968, synthetic polymer paint on canvas, (a-b) 304.0 x 213.0 cm (overall). Newcastle Art Gallery, Newcastle. Gift of the artist, 2000 (2000.002a-b)	25
Wendy Paramor	Australia 1938-75	Luke, 1967, remade 2000, powder coated aluminium (a-b) 214.0 x 122.0 x 48.0 cm (each). Casula Powerhouse, Sydney. From the Liverpool City Council Collection, Courtesy of Casula Powerhouse Arts Centre, 2000 (CP2008.135)	30
Wendy Paramor	Australia 1938-75	Triad, 1967, galvanised iron and automotive paint, (a-c) 120.0 x 20.0 x 120.0 cm (each). Casula Powerhouse, Sydney, By courtesy Luke Weston Paramor and Casula Powerhouse Arts Centre, 2012 (CP.2008.065)	30
Wendy Paramor	Australia 1938-75	Diablo, 1967, synthetic polymer paint on composition board, 122.5 x 186.0 cm. Casula Powerhouse, Sydney. From the Liverpool City Council Collection, Courtesy of Casula Powerhouse Arts Centre, 2000 (CP1466)	30
Paul Partos	Czechoslovakia 1943- Australia 2002, Australia from 1949	Vesta II, 1968, synthetic polymer paint on canvas, 230.0 x 251.0 cm. Art Gallery of New South Wales, Sydney. Visual Arts Board Australia Council Contemporary Art Purchase Grant 1975 (10.1975)	25
Paul Partos	Czechoslovakia 1943- Australia 2002, Australia from 1949	Orphea, 1968, synthetic polymer paint on canvas, (a-b) 244.7 x 366.9 cm (overall). Collection of The University of Queensland, Brisbane. Purchased with the assistance of the Visual Arts Board of the Australia Council, 1979 (1979.13.a-b)	25
John Peart	Australia 1945-2013	Cool corner II, 1968, synthetic polymer paint on canvas, 236.2 x 236.2 cm. Art Gallery of New South Wales, Sydney. Gift of the artist 1968 (OA27.1968)	23
John Peart	Australia 1945-2013	Corner square diagonal, 1968, synthetic polymer paint on canvas, 229.2 x 227.6 x 12.6 cm. National Gallery of Victoria, Melbourne. Purchased through The Art Foundation Victoria with funds provided by the Gallery Society of Victoria, Governor. (AC11·1985)	23
Emanuel Raft	Egypt born 1938- Australia 2016, Australia from 1956	Monolith 5, (Redux), 1966, (remade 2015-17) painted wood, 182.9 x 61.0 x 21.0 cm. Estate of the artist, Sydney	30
Emanuel Raft	Egypt born 1938- Australia 2016, Australia from 1956	Monolith 8, (Redux) 1966, (remade 2015-17), painted wood, 182.9 x 63.6 x 15.6 cm, Estate of the artist, Sydney	30
Mel Ramsden	England born 1944, Australia 1963-64, United States 1967-77	No title, 1966, enamel paint on canvas, 12.7 x 335.3 cm. Art Gallery of Ballarat, Ballarat. Purchased with the assistance of the Visual Arts Board, Australia Council, 1979 (1979.202)	24
Ron Robertson-Swann	Australia born 1941, England 1963-68	Golden breach, 1965, synthetic polymer paint on cotton duck, 259.2 x 111.2 cm. Art Gallery of New South Wales, Sydney. Purchased, 1983 (234.1983)	27
Ron Robertson-Swann	Australia born 1941, England 1963-68	Orange oriel, 1965, synthetic polymer paint on cotton duck, 248.5 x 129.5 cm. Private collection, Brisbane	27
Ron Robertson-Swann	Australia born 1941, England 1963-68	Start, 1965, synthetic polymer paint on cotton duck, 248.3 x 129.5 cm, Collection of the artist, Sydney	27
Robert Rooney	Australia 1937-2017	Kind-hearted kitchen-garden IV, 1968, synthetic polymer paint on canvas, 168.0 x 168.0 cm. The University of Melbourne Art Collection. Purchased with assistance from the Visual Arts Board, Australia Council 1985 (1985.0041.000.000)	31
Rollin Schlicht	Gilbert and Ellice Islands 1937- Australia 2011, Australia from 1939, England 1956-66	Twentieth century note, 1968, synthetic polymer paint on canvas, 274.3 x 411.5 cm.	31
Rollin Schlicht	Gilbert and Ellice Islands 1937- Australia 2011, Australia from 1939, England 1956-66	Dempsey, 1968, synthetic polymer paint on canvas, 286.0 x 411.5 cm. Private collection, Brisbane	31
Udo Sellbach	Germany 1926- Australia 2006, Australia from 1955	The myth of the machine, 1968, synthetic polymer paint on canvas, 183.2 x 153.0 cm. Private collection, Melbourne	42
Eric Shirley	Australia 1919–2008	Encore, 1967, polyvinyl acetate on composition board, 349.2 x 233.5 cm. Collection unknown	49
Joseph Szabo	Hungary 1932- Australia 1984, Australia from 1950	Without-within 7, 1968, synthetic polymer paint on canvas, 165.5 x 150.0 cm. Collection unknown	36
Joseph Szabo	Hungary 1932- Australia 1984, Australia from 1950	Without-within 8,1968, synthetic polymer paint on canvas, 167.0 x 151.0 cm. Collection unknown	36
Vernon Treweeke	Australia 1939-2015, Europe and England 1961-66	Ultrascope 5, 1968, remade 2015-18, oil on canvas on plywood, 386.0 x 257.0 cm. Estate of the artist, New South Wales.	29
Vernon Treweeke	Australia 1939-2015, Europe and England 1961-66	Ultrascope 6, 1968, remade 2015-18, oil on canvas on plywood, 514.5 x 514.5 cm. Estate of the artist, New South Wales	29
Trevor Vickers	Australia born 1943	Untitled, 1968, remade 2017, synthetic polymer paint on canvas, 243.8 x 367.0 cm. Collection of the artist, Perth.	25
Trevor Vickers	Australia born 1943	Untitled, 1968, synthetic polymer paint on canvassynthetic polymer paint on canvas, 174.6 x 401 .8 cm. National Gallery of Australia, Canberra. Purchased, 1969 (69.95)	25
Dick Watkins	Australia born 1937	October, 1967, synthetic polymer paint on canvas, 244.0 x 305.0 cm. Art Gallery of New South Wales, Sydney. Gift of Garry Pursell 2008 (53.2008.a-b)	31
Dick Watkins	Australia born 1937	The Mooche, 1967, polyvinyl acetate and oil on canvas, 167.5 x 167.5 cm. Queensland Art Gallery, Brisbane. The James C Sourris, AM, Collection. Gift of James C Sourris, AM, through the Queensland Art Gallery I Gallery of Modern Art Foundation 2014. Donated through the Australian Government's Cultural Gifts Program (2014.287)	31
John White	New Zealand 1930- Australia 2003, Australia 1939-50, England 1950-53, Australia from 1953	Broken marriage, 1967, synthetic polymer paint on canvas, 168.0 x 168.0 cm. Macquarie University Art Collection, Sydney. Gift of the artist. Donated through the Australian Government 's Cultural Gifts Program by Merilynne Johnson, 2005 (MUACA 2005/14/1)	38
Normana Wight	Australia born 1936	Untitled 1968, remade 2017, synthetic polymer paint on canvas, (a-b) 360 .7 x 152.7 cm. Collection of the artist, Brisbane	32

== Legacy ==
The Field continued to be the subject of debate and theorising for fifty years and it has been revisited in subsequent shows;

- The Field Now (1984)
- Australian Art 1960-1986: Field to Figuration (1987)
- Fieldwork (2002)
- The Field Revisited (2018)

The original show established abstraction as significant in contemporary Australian art and in its recognition by the public, and confirmed the public art museum as a venue that could display the ‘avant-garde’ and challenge ideas. It is argued by art historian Jim Berryman and others that The Field represented the tail-end of Modernism, with many of the artists represented moving in other directions, toward Post-Modernism.
