= Gallery A =

Art gallery in Melbourne, Victoria, Australia

Coordinates: 37.839488°S 144.996215°E

Gallery A was a mid-century Australian gallery that exhibited contemporary Australian art. It was established in 1959 at 60 Flinders Lane, Melbourne, and then relocated to 275 Toorak Road., South Yarra. A second Gallery A venue was opened and run concurrently at 21 Gipps Street, Paddington in Sydney from 1964, and a third in Canberra (1964, closed 1970). The Sydney business largely displaced the Melbourne gallery, which also closed in 1970, and continued until 1983. Its founder was Max Hutchinson and other directors during the history of the gallery at its three venues included Clement Meadmore, James Mollison, Janet Dawson and Ann Lewis.

== History ==
=== Melbourne ===
The founding director of Gallery A was Max Hutchinson (1925–1999) whose business Adroit Displays, in Flinders Lane, Melbourne, was furniture, commercial display and industrial design and who was a founding member of the Society of Designers for Industry in Australia. At the suggestion of sculptor and fellow furniture designer Clement Meadmore, who wanted to create a 'little Bauhaus in Melbourne,' Hutchinson used his showrooms to exhibit contemporary Australian design and "exciting developments in abstraction".

With Meadmore as first director, during the early part of 1962 it closed its first location at Flinders Lane, Melbourne to open later that year in larger premises at 275 Toorak Road, South Yarra. There, Janet Dawson, who had returned in late November 1960 after nearly four years in Europe, started an art school and print shop where she worked 1962-64 as a lithographic proof printer for visiting artists, including John Brack, John Olsen and Fred Williams.

Dawson collaborated with Hutchinson and Meadmore on the gallery's major 1961 exhibition The Bauhaus: Aspects and Influence, which included the latter's work alongside that of Bauhaus master Ludwig Hirschfeld-Mack and opened by architect Robin Boyd.

Working as the gallery manager and technical assistant, Dawson's abstraction developed through her adoption of acrylic paint and shaped composition boards which she used in her design of furniture for the gallery, made at the invitation of the Australian Laminex company and fabricated by Steven Davis in Melbourne; one item from her ‘Living Art’ table top series of 1964 is in the Queensland Art Gallery Collection. Having shown prints and drawings at Gallery A, Dawson held her first painting solo there in 1964, while James Mollison, managed the Melbourne Gallery A over 1964–1965.

=== Sydney ===
Wishing to expand Gallery A to Sydney, Hutchinson collaborated with Ann Lewis, her business partner artist and collector Rua Osborne and later Rowena Burrell, and opened a second gallery there in November 1964, with a third venue being opened simultaneously in Canberra. Gallery A Sydney was located at 21 Gipps Street Paddington in a renovated stone Georgian cottage and closed in September 1983.

Its nearly twenty years of exhibitions were also influential and included Mike Brown’s censor-baiting 1965 exhibition, Paintin’ a-go-go!; Stan Ostoja-Kotkowski op art paintings and electronic drawings in 1966; the anti-Vietnam War Arts Vietnam of 1968; the Ralph Balson memorial exhibitions; and experimental installations of the early 1970s by Peter Kennedy. The Melbourne and Canberra galleries closed when in 1970 Max Hutchinson shifted his business to New York. Gallery A, Sydney continued to operate under a new board of directors, and continued to show Australian and American avant-garde hardedge, abstract expressionist painting, and sculpture. The gallery was influential in art in Sydney.

=== Canberra ===
The Canberra branch of Gallery A, started in 1964 and officially opened 31 March 1965, was in the Enrico Taglietti designed Town House Motel, Rudd St, Canberra City. It closed in 1966, but reopened after a relocation, until 1970.

== Influence ==
Hutchinson moved to live to America in 1978. Prominent in Australian art circles in the 1960s, from 1968 he ran Max Hutchinson Gallery at 127 Greene St. in New York City. In 1974, Hutchinson expanded his New York showroom across the street to open Sculpture Now at 142 Greene St., and that year recommended the controversial purchase of Jackson Pollock's Blue Poles to the National Gallery of Australia director Mollison, who had progressed to that position via Gallery A. Max Hutchinson Gallery moved to larger premises next door at 138-140 Greene St in 1976. In 1985, Hutchinson moved his activity to Sullivan County where he created an 88-acre outdoor sculpture gallery on an old farm in Kenoza Lake. He died of liver failure on 23 April 1999 in the Community General Hospital of Sullivan County in Harris, New York.

== Selected exhibitions ==
- 1959: A selection of work from the Rudy Komon collection.
- 1959: Eight Australians, Nancy Borlase, John Coburn, John Dutruc, Kenneth Hood, George Johnson, Elwyn Lynn, John Ogburn, Peter Upward, 28 July – 21 August, with catalogue including a short essay titled "Abstract painting in Sydney" by Elwyn Lynn.
- 1960: Australian Sculpture
- 1961: The Bauhaus : aspects and influence, Olsen, Rose, Rapotec, Hessing, Meadmore, Smith, Upward, Gilliland. Catalogue with short essay text by Ludwig Hirschfeld-Mack. July–August.
- 1963: Institute of Victorian Photographers, (including Wolfgang Sievers), August
- 1964, from 4 August: David Aspden, paintings, South Yarra
- 1965, February: Charles Reddington
- 1965: Naive painting, Henri Bastin, Frances Bilson, Perle Hessing, Irvine Homer, H.E. Hughes, V.C. Jaggers, W. Millar, G. Linden, Matilda Lister, Muriel Luders, William August Schipp, Edward Kenneth Smart.
- 1966–7: Gallery A. Summer exhibition 66, Australian paintings drawings watercolours sculpture. Artists exhibiting were Sydney Ball, Jennifer Barwell, Henry Bastin, Charles Blackman, Arthur Boyd, John Brack, Donald Brook, Mike Brown, Judy Cassab, Peter Clarke, John Coburn, Martin Collocott, Jack Courier, Ray Crooke, Janet Dawson, Robert Dickerson, Russell Drysdale, Peggy Fauser, Maximilian Feuerring, John Firth-Smith, William Frater, Peter Freeman, Leonard French, Donald Friend, Marjorie Gillespie, James Gleeson, Thomas Gleghorn, Anne Hall, Pro Hart, Elaine Haxton, John Henshaw, Daryl Hill, Ludwig Hirschfeld-Mack, Leonard Hessing, Perle Hessing, Robert Hughes, Robert Klippel, Michael Kmit, Colin Lanceley, Richard Larter, Francis Lymburner, Elwyn Lynn, Mary MacQueen, Marsha Morgan, Sydney Nolan, Alan Oldfield, John Olsen, Stan Ostoja-Kotkowski, William Peascod, John Perceval, Carl Plate, Peter Powditch, Clifton Pugh, Emanuel Raft, Stanislaus Rapotec, Charles Reddington, Stephen Reed, John Rigby, Jan Riske, William Rose, Rosemary Ryan, Gareth Sansom, Michael Shannon, Imre Szigeti, Michael Taylor, Stan De Teliga, Peter Upward, David Warren, Guy Warren, Richard Weight, Robert Williams, Les Willis, Ken Whisson, Peter Wright. Shown in both Melbourne and Sydney and continued until 24 February 1967.
- 196(?): Kathleen Boyle, Gareth Jones-Roberts, Janet Dawson, James Meldrum, Soula Paulay, Stanislaus Rapotec, John Olsen.
- 196(?): Sydney young painters
- 1965: Original lithographs and serigraphs: "Bathers" series by Peter Powditch
- 1965: Introduction '65, Janet Dawson, Leonard Hessing, Robert Klippel, Colin Lanceley, John Olsen, Charles Reddington.
- 1965. [catalogue list photocopy]. (one sheet). Artists were Elizabeth Bell, Vivienne Binns, Mike Brown, Ted Castle, Bill Degan, Stephen Earle, John Firth-Smith, Col Jordan, Mike Kitching, Edward May, Peter Powditch, Candida Raymond, Stephen Reed, John Stockdale, Ann Thomson, Dick Watkins, Ian Van Wieringen, Peter Wright.
- 196(?) The Australian nude
- 1966, from 7 April: Leon Urbonas, Paintings, Canberra
- 1967: This time in camera, May–June, Wesley Stacey, Garry Shead, David Stiven.
- 1967 (?) The nude in Australian art, John Bell, Charles Blackman, Patrick Boileau, Arthur Boyd, John Brack, Mike Brown, William Dobell, Russell Drysdale, Max Feuerring, Donald Friend, James Gleeson, Paul Haefliger, Kenneth Hood, Richard Larter, Norman Lindsay, Francis Lymburner, Rosemary Madigan, Edward May, Godfrey Miller, Jon Molvig, Arthur Murch, Justin O'Brien, John Perceval, Peter Powditch, Charles Reddington, Michael Shaw, Andrew Sibley, Jeffrey Smart, Imre Szegeti, William Frater.
- 1967, March: Robert Klippel, sculpture, Melbourne=
- 1967: New generation Sydney, Martin Collocott, John Firth-Smith, Michael Johnson, Tony McGillick, Peter Powditch, Rollin Schlicht, Michael Taylor, Dick Watkins, Peter Wright, 28 February-18 March
- 1968: Piatti–world renowned Swiss designer Celestino Piatti, from 11 January 1968.
- 1968, May 15(?)–31: includes Paul Partos, Trevor Vickers, Udo Sellbach, Royston Harpur, Janet Dawson, South Yarra
- 1968: Contemporary Nordic Art, June
- 1968: Group 2, Robert Brown, Martin Collocott, John Firth-Smith, Andrew Nott, Peter Powditch, David Warren.
- 1968: Stanislaus Rapotec, November
- 1969: Concrete Poems by Alan Riddell;
- 1969: Red and Blue by John Edward, December
- 1970, February: Mark Strizic photographs, with Fred Lowen, furniture, Melbourne Transformation, South Yarra
