= Janet Dawson =

Australian painter and printmaker (born 1935)

Janet Dawson MBE
- Born: 1935 (age 90–91); Sydney, Australia
- Education: National Gallery of Victoria Art School; Slade School of Fine Art
- Known for: Painting
- Movement: Color field
- Spouse: Michael Boddy (m. 1968; died 2014)

Janet Dawson MBE (born 1935, Sydney) is an Australian artist who was a pioneer of abstract painting in Australia in the 1960s, having been introduced to abstraction during studies in England while she lived in Europe 1957–1960. She was also an accomplished lithographic printer of her own works as well as those of other renowned Australian artists, a theatre-set and furniture designer. She studied in England and Italy on scholarships before returning to Australia in 1960. She won the Art Gallery of New South Wales’ Archibald Prize in 1973 with the portrait of her husband, entitled Michael Boddy Reading. She has exhibited across Australia and overseas, and her work is held in major Australian and English collections. In 1977 she was awarded an MBE for services to art. In 2025-2026, the Art Gallery of New South Wales is dedicating a retrospective to Dawson's work.

== Career ==
Dawson was born in Sydney in 1935 and spent her early years in Forbes. She started to take a keen interest in art at age 11 beginning her formal art tuition in Saturday morning classes at H. Septimus Power's private art school from 1946 to 1949, before living in Clarence Street, East Malvern working as a doctor's receptionist while she studied (1952 to 1956) at the National Gallery of Victoria Art School in Melbourne first under William Dargie, who was then replaced by Alan Sumner as head of school. Art critic Robert Hughes in 1962 after Sumner's resignation wrote complaining that "since his appointment as the school's head in 1947, Mr Sumner seems to have produced no young painter whose work is of any significance whatever — except Janet Dawson, whose unquestionable talent comes, in part, from a revolt against the flaccid academism Mr Sumner has preached."

In 1955 Dawson won Gallery Art School Prizes including the Grace Joel Scholarship (Nude), Hugh Ramsey Portrait Prize, one for an ‘Abstract Painting’, another for 'A Panel of Three Drawings from Life', a 2nd prize for a 'Head study', and the 'National Gallery Society Scholarship for best subject drawing or panel of drawings in exhibition.'

A 1955 newspaper article reports that as an art student "she concentrates mainly on semi-abstracts and enjoys working on large canvases. Murals are her particular interest" and that "her highest ambition is to win the school's travelling scholarship" of £900 for three years study abroad, then held by West Australian painter Frances Woolley (b.1930). Indeed, the following year she was the joint winner, with friend Kathleen Boyle, of the award; the National Gallery of Victoria Travelling Scholarship, for a painting of three figures on the Gallery steps, reporting that she; "made a model of plasticine and painted the picture from that." Aged 22, she embarked on the SS Roma.

=== International study and travel ===
Landing in Genoa in mid July 1957, and stopping at Milan, Bern and Paris, Dawson arrived in London. There she studied at the Slade School of Fine Art between late 1957 and mid-1959. In London, Janet attended an exhibition New American Art at the Tate in 1959 and was impressed by the simplicity and glowing colours of paintings by Rothko, Still, and Motherwell. In Paris she saw the work of Dubuffet and Miro which also had a decisive influence.

Deborah Clark notes; "The influence of European surrealism can be seen in Dawson's use of particular marks and symbols, and her admiration for the warmth and openness of American abstract painters like Jackson Pollock and Mark Rothko (whose work she saw at the Tate Gallery in 1959) also emerges, but her use of formal devices of abstraction is embedded in a genuine response to the sensations of the landscape itself."

She loved to draw, so she studied lithography, which allows an artist to draw directly on a printing stone. In 1959 she won the Slade School lithography prize which included a Boise scholarship that enabled her to travel to Italy. There, from late 1959 to early 1960, she took up residence in the hilltop village of Anticoli Corrado where the British School at Rome retained workspaces for artists. During her three months there, Dawson made drawings of the landscape which are held by the National Gallery of Victoria, the Art Gallery of New South Wales and the NGA. Abstraction, which she had once found disturbing, in her Italian landscape drawings appears in "sensual renderings," broad strokes; waves, marks and symbols that covered the paper so that hills and valleys were transformed into sensual lines and motifs. Her art became almost exclusively abstract.

From Italy, Dawson travelled to Paris early in 1960. At the Dutch Tachiste Nono Reinhold's Atelier Patris that ran 1957–61 at 26 rue Boulard, where she was the only woman amongst five printers, she worked printing for School of Paris artists in Paris, proof printing lithographs by artists Pierre Soulages, Fritz Hundertwasser and Kumi Sugai and others, and translated her Italian drawings into lithographs with bold colours, lines and strokes The five lithographs she made at the Atelier Patris in Paris during 1960 are in the collections of the NGV, the AGNSW and the NGA. Dawson returned to Melbourne in late 1960.

=== Gallery A ===
Returning after nearly four years to Australia in late November 1960 Rather than any of the range of fine art galleries in Melbourne, Dawson chose Gallery A, a design and furniture retail space that included an art gallery in Flinders St. for her first solo show opening 18 May 1961, then was employed by the gallery with responsibilities that included collaborating with dealer Max Hutchinson and furniture designer and sculptor, Clement Meadmore on the gallery's major 1961 exhibition The Bauhaus: Aspects and Influence. Dawson also founded the Gallery A Print Workshop, working at the studio as a lithographic proof printer for visiting artists, described by James Gleeson as 'pioneering' Australian graphic arts. In this role she introduced Australian artists including John Brack, John Olsen and Fred Williams to lithography. Among her students were Graeme Cohen, Richard Havyatt and Winston Thomas. Also in 1961, in November she issued a call amongst Australian printmakers for works, 10 of which were to be chosen to represent the country in Prints of the World being organised by collector and curator Robert Erskine in London. A special September 1963 edition of Meanjin devoted to French writing featured her work on its cover and as illustrations throughout.

Working as the gallery manager and technical assistant, Dawson's abstraction developed through her adoption of acrylic paint and shaped composition boards. Related to, and influential on her art, was her design of furniture for the gallery, one item of which is in the Queensland Art Gallery Collection from her ‘Living Art’ table top series of 1964 made at the invitation of the Australian Laminex company and fabricated by Steven Davis in Melbourne. Angela Goddard describes Dawson's tables as;

"singular in Australian art: they oscillate between design and art, uniting function and aesthetics. Her use of Laminex's strong flat colours echoes contemporary American abstraction, particularly Jasper Johns's late 1950s Target paintings and Frank Stella's Protractor series of the 1960s. But in the form of coffee tables, these table tops become both arresting abstract works as well as musings on the reductive methodology of abstraction, indeed even suggesting playful criticism of the use-value of abstract painting."

Having shown prints and drawings at Gallery A, she held her first painting solo there in 1964.

== Colour field painting ==
Robert Lindsay notes that; "It was through a group of artists returning to Australia in the early and mid 1960s that the new international style became established. Janet Dawson returned in 1961, Dick Watkins in 1962, Sydney Ball from New York in 1965, and also in 1965 Tony McGillick..."

Artists from this group, including Dawson, were represented 21 August–28 September 1968 in The Field, the exhibition inaugurating the new venue of the NGV on St. Kilda Road Melbourne. Curators of the exhibition John Stringer, Exhibitions Officer, and Brian Finemore, Curator of Australian Art selected two works by Dawson. One of only three women invited, beside Wendy Paramour and Normana Wright, she showed her large-scale recent works; Wall 11, 1968–69, synthetic polymer paint on canvas, 184.3 x 184.4 cm., which was soon purchased by the National Gallery of Australia in 1969; and Rollascape 2, 1968, synthetic polymer paint on an irregularly-shaped composition board, 150.0 x 275.0 cm. The latter was purchased by the Art Gallery of Ballarat with assistance of the Visual Arts/Craft Board of the Australia Council, in 1988.

During the 1970s Dawson moved away from such Hard Edge abstraction to a more 'painterly' style, but maintained her formal vocabulary; at the time of her 1979 survey show Mary Eagle noted "she sees everything in nature blending, flowing together..."

== Style and reception ==
James Gleeson, comparing works of Dawson, Rapotec and Coburn in a group show at Hungry Horse Gallery in August 1964, notes "the serenity of spirit that lies behind the vivacious conversation of Janet Dawson's colours," and goes on to predict that;

“Janet Dawson and John Coburn have enough in common to make one feel that they are probably travelling in the same direction though on different but parallel paths. Both are fascinated by the way colours react under different circumstances and they love to exploit the ambivalent nature of colours…Dawson is less bound to a linear treatment. She sometimes allows her colours to waver, overlap and blend.”

Dawson was involved in the Colour Field movement; abstraction that used flat, solid and graduated hues to make colour its own subject. Art historian Bernard Smith writes that "Colour painting first began to appear rather hesitantly upon the Australian scene around 1963. Two artists are of special importance for its appearance, Dick Watkins in Sydney and Janet Dawson in Melbourne." She was among the artists exhibited in The Field at the National Gallery of Victoria in 1968. The exhibition opened too much controversy, but launched the careers of many of the young artists. Dawson was one of only three women artists in the exhibition, (re-staged in 2018). Donald Brook, in year of The Field, reviewed a May exhibition Paintings by Janet Dawson at Gallery A, and described her approach at the time to the painting as an object;

"She is a non-figurative painter who has quite recently turned away from painting shapes within pictures as Miro might have done, to painting strictly on the surface of picture, in the sense in which biscuit tins and barbers’ poles are painted on. A hint to encourage this reading of what is done — of seeing a coloured object rather than an illusionistic picture — is the by now familiar device of using irregular, un-picture-like shapes. Janet Dawson constructs many of her supports with an unusual profile in two, and sometimes in three dimensions. She divides and colours them in a wry way, so that the line and boundaries pluck and tug at each other with awkward optical stress."

In 1970 Brook expands on this assessment:

"Janet Dawson…uses oval supports and refers back a little to early Mondrian, to Kandinsky, and perhaps to the dynamism of Wyndham Lewis, or maybe to Rayonnism. The blend is so smooth that one cannot say precisely. She contrives, with thick, very physical paint in dense and muted hues, an effect of flowing or oscillating liquids or filaments of irregularly stranded rope. The movements are diverted, arrested and slipped over and behind each other by fixed barriers working like breakwaters or baffles. There is a little implied depth, but no implication that what confronts the viewer is anything other than tangible brushed pigment on a vertically mounted support attached to the wall of a room."

Mary Eagle identifies in Dawson's early painting "themes of architectural and atmospheric space and light and images of clouds, moons and rainbows" that continue into her abstract work.

Of Dawson's winning the Archibald Prize which marks a point in her career of departure from pure abstraction, art historian Patrick McCaughey praised the "loose painterly treatment of figure and supports" and considered her success "surprising and deserving" because "Miss Dawson is better known as a sophisticated abstract painter. To find her venturing into the staid area of the Archibald and then carrying all before her is a marvellous reversal of the expected..."

Remarking on work Dawson produced after moving to country Binalong, Daniel Thomas in a 1974 review declared her "one of Australia's very best artists", but "now 'modern' only in the sense that she knows all about colour and form and surface; she can clamp forms to the edge of her canvas, secure in the knowledge that all is masterfully under control." He considers the show evidence of "her perhaps reluctant return to the 'old-fashioned'. The exhibition is not only about pink and yellow singing together...It is also about agriculture and being cold, and needing rain, and about how the gum trees at the bottom of the paddock are primeval, grey, hairy monsters. If anyone does an exhibition of gum-tree painting, Janet Dawson now has to be included, along with Lister Lister, Hans Heysen and Sidney Nolan." In an August 1977 Gallery A show she augmented such imagery, though on a macro scale, without the gum trees, with collage, as Nancy Borlase notes in her review;

"This time there are no gum trees. She is showing three series: Foxy Night, Practical House Designs, and Traditional Portrait Drawings. As well there is a panel of Featherscapes, tiny painted sunsets to which she collages the most fragile of natural objects — feathers, twigs, grass. pods, a crushed eggshell. She is using collage for the first time - painting with torn paper, feathers, a crumpled rag crushed behind the glass in Big Rising Moon 2."

Gary Catalano writing in 1988 about her solo show in Richmond, questions, then reluctantly concurs with, Eagle's comparison of Dawson's metaphysics with Blake's, and highlights the artist's surrealism:

"Dawson's metaphysic, it must be stressed, is not Blakean in Its constituents. Blake housed everything in the human body and thereby magnified its transformational energies; Dawson's vision, which is neither anthropomorphic in its character nor politically radical in its thrust, reduces the world to the workings of water. There are, of course, many things in these paintings that defy common sense. A hemispherical bowl brimming with water hovers in space at the top of the T-shaped 'Spirit Level I'; a cup tilts itself and water spills down the edge of the same painting, its flow arrested not by rocks but, rather, by a fictional fold in the canvas. But this playfulness has a serious intent. Quite simply, Dawson believes that literal and imaginative truths are by no means incompatible."

Catalano's 1997 interview with the artist allowed Dawson to give her own response to the question of metaphysics:

"Naturalism and symbolism are fully reconcilable. Of course. you don't name styles or techniques to yourself as you work; it would be a rotten job if you did. But...the arrangement of the petals of a Fool dahlia employs the same spiral structure as a galaxy or other cosmic conglomerate. So, from that point of view there's not much difference between a dahlia and a galaxy. and there's no need to play magic realism tricks. The dahlia is under my nose, so it's more useful to study and draw. The big in the little. There has to be that interest - textural, tactile, detailed interest - to take you further. Most of the works that sing in your mind have those qualities embedded, not 'explained'."

On the occasion of Dawson's 1996 drawing survey at the National Gallery of Australia, John McDonald of The Sydney Morning Herald remarked that the exhibition was;

"a revelation in its lucid intertwining of close observation and formal invention. The dividing line between abstract and figurative and is crossed and recrossed until one recognises only a single continuum, defined by the touch and personality of the artist. Nothing, in this respect, is better than a 1995 series of 13 drawings of a red cabbage that charts the entire life-cycle of the vegetable from first sprouting to decomposition. By using this single motif, Dawson is able to explore a full range of tone, lines and textures, in the same way that Monet painted Rouen Cathedral, haystack or poplars, over and over again, to capture the fugitive effects of light."

Considering later work McDonald remarks that;

"By the end of the [1970s], she is working on the Foxy Night paintings, which turn moon and landscape into a series of geometric declensions, softened by feathery, gestural brushwork. I have alway found these paintings to be a slightly awkward attempt at forging a synthesis between Iyrical and geometric abstraction: and the lead-up drawings show Dawson plotting with the deliberateness of a cartographer. This raises a niggling question about the balance between drawing and painting in Dawson's career. In this survey, she emerges as such a natural and complete draftsperson that one wonders if there is anything in her paintings that she has not already accomplished as a graphic artist. To know what is added, or perhaps lost, in a different medium. we may have to wait for a painting retrospective."

== Partnership ==
In 1968 Dawson married Michael Boddy (1934–2014), a British-born playwright and actor, educated at Cambridge, who migrated to Australia in 1960 and whom she met in 1963 in Melbourne while she was designing for the Emerald Hill Theatre and on the set of his play You'll Come to Love Your Sperm Test. At that time she was working 1969–1971 full-time in the display department of the Australian Museum, Sydney, which she credits, because of the 'natural history' to which it exposed her, as an influence on her painting.

In 1973 she produced sets for productions of Boddy's plays The Legend of King O'Malley and Cash, illustrations for a collection of essays on O'Malley and Boddy's "The Last Supper Show" at the Nimrod Theatre where he was playwright-in-residence. They partnered in a program in schools on the production and staging of plays before moving from Waverley to the village of Binalong, New South Wales, and with a painting of her husband surrounded by gardening implements Dawson became the third woman to win the Archibald Prize for her Michael Boddy Reading, her first and only entry in the Prize.

In 1977 they lived at 'Scribble Rock', a small property just outside the settlement, and there, from 22 December 1994 to May 1995 she produced the Scribble Rock Red Cabbage series purchased in its entirety by the National Gallery of Australia. In 1981 Dawson and her husband relocated to Canberra to help establish Theatre ACT, returning to Binalong in 1985. That year, the Australia Council awarded Dawson the A$19,250 full standard artist's grant.

Boddy died in 2014 and Dawson moved to Ocean Grove, Victoria. Michael had three children, including a son who pre-deceased Boddy.

== Exhibitions ==
- 1961: solo show, paintings, lithographs, drawings, Gallery A, Melbourne.
- 1963: Prints '63, Studio One Printmakers. Skinner Galleries (1963 – 1963); Newcastle Region Art Gallery (1 September 1963 – 1 September 1963); Castlemaine Art Gallery And Historical Museum (1 September 1963 – 1 September 1963); Rudy Komon Art Gallery (1 September 1963 – 1 September 1963); Douglas Gallery (1 September 1963 – 1 September 1963); National Gallery Of Victoria (11 September 1963 – 6 October 1963); Bonython Art Gallery, Adelaide (1 October 1963 – 1 October 1963); Yosheido Gallery, Tokyo (1964 – 1964)
- 1964, August: group show, Hungry Horse Gallery, Sydney
- 1965: Introduction '65, Janet Dawson, Leonard Hessing, Robert Klippel, Colin Lanceley, John Olsen, Charles Reddington. Gallery A, Melbourne
- 1966: included in an exhibition of contemporary Australian painting in Los Angeles and San Francisco
- 1966/7: Gallery A. Summer exhibition 66, Australian paintings drawings watercolours sculpture. Artists exhibiting were Sydney Ball, Jennifer Barwell, Henry Bastin, Charles Blackman, Arthur Boyd, John Brack, Donald Brook, Mike Brown, Judy Cassab, Peter Clarke, John Coburn, Martin Collocott, Jack Courier, Ray Crooke, Robert Dickerson, Russell Drysdale, Peggy Fauser, Maximilian Feuerring, John Firth-Smith, William Frater, Peter Freeman, Leonard French, Donald Friend, Marjorie Gillespie, James Gleeson, Thomas Gleghorn, Anne Hall, Pro Hart, Elaine Haxton, John Henshaw, Daryl Hill, Ludwig Hirschfeld-Mack, Leonard Hessing, Perle Hessing, Robert Hughes, Robert Klippel, Michael Kmit, Colin Lanceley, Richard Larter, Francis Lymburner, Elwyn Lynn, Mary MacQueen, Marsha Morgan, Sydney Nolan, Alan Oldfield, John Olsen, Stan Ostoja-Kotkowski, William Peascod, John Perceval, Carl Plate, Peter Powditch, Clifton Pugh, Emanuel Raft, Stanislaus Rapotec, Charles Reddington, Stephen Reed, John Rigby, Jan Riske, William Rose, Rosemary Ryan, Gareth Sansom, Michael Shannon, Imre Szigeti, Michael Taylor, Stan De Teliga, Peter Upward, David Warren, Guy Warren, Richard Weight, Robert Williams, Les Willis, Ken Whisson, Peter Wright. Shown in both Melbourne and Sydney branches of Gallery A and continued until 24 February 1967
- 1968:The Field exhibition. Two paintings included amongst 74 abstract works by 40 artists working in hard edge abstraction, colour field painting, using shaped canvases, and conceptual art. National Gallery of Victoria
- 1979: survey exhibition, National Gallery of Victoria
- 1988, Feb-Mar: solo show, 312 Lennox St., Richmond
- 1996, 22 June–11 August: The Drawings of Janet Dawson; survey show, National Gallery of Australia
- 1998–2019: Six solo shows at Stella Downer Fine Art, Sydney
- 2000: Challenge and Response in Australian Art, 1955–65, National Gallery of Australia 2002 Intimate Portraits, National Portrait Gallery, Canberra
- 2002–2019: Ten group shows at Charles Nodrum Gallery, Melbourne
- 2006: Survey Exhibition, Bathurst Gallery, NSW; S.H. Ervin Gallery, Sydney; University of Queensland Art Museum; Tasmanian Museum and Art Gallery; Mornington Peninsula Regional Art Gallery, Vic.
- 2007–2019: Group shows at Stella Downer Fine Art, Sydney
- 2008: Modern Times, Powerhouse Museum, Sydney
- 2012: Janet Dawson: A Personal View, Goulburn Regional Art Gallery, NSW
- 2015/19: Two solo shows at Nancy Sever Gallery, Canberra
- 2017: Abstraction: Celebrating Australian Women Abstract Artists, Geelong Art Gallery, Vic. and travelling
- 2018: The Field Revisited, National Gallery of Victoria
- 2019: Trying to find comfort in an uncomfortable chair - Paintings from the Cruthers Collection of Australian Women's Art, University of Western Australia, Perth
- 2019: Cloud Comics, Nancy Sever Gallery, Canberra
- 2020: Know My Name featuring 150 female Australian artists from 1900 to the 21st century, National Gallery of Australia
- 2025–2026: Far Away, So Close, Art Gallery of New South Wales

== Awards and recognition ==
- 1956: National Gallery of Victoria Travelling Scholarship
- 1959: Boise Scholarship
- 1973: Archibald Prize
- 1977: MBE for service to art
- 1985: Australia Council for the Arts grant

== Collections ==
- Royal Society, London
- Art Gallery of New South Wales
- National Gallery of Australia
- National Gallery of Victoria
- Art Gallery of South Australia
- UCL Art Museum, University College London
