= Alan McLeod McCulloch =

Australian art critic, art historian and artist (1907–1992)

Alan McLeod McCulloch AO
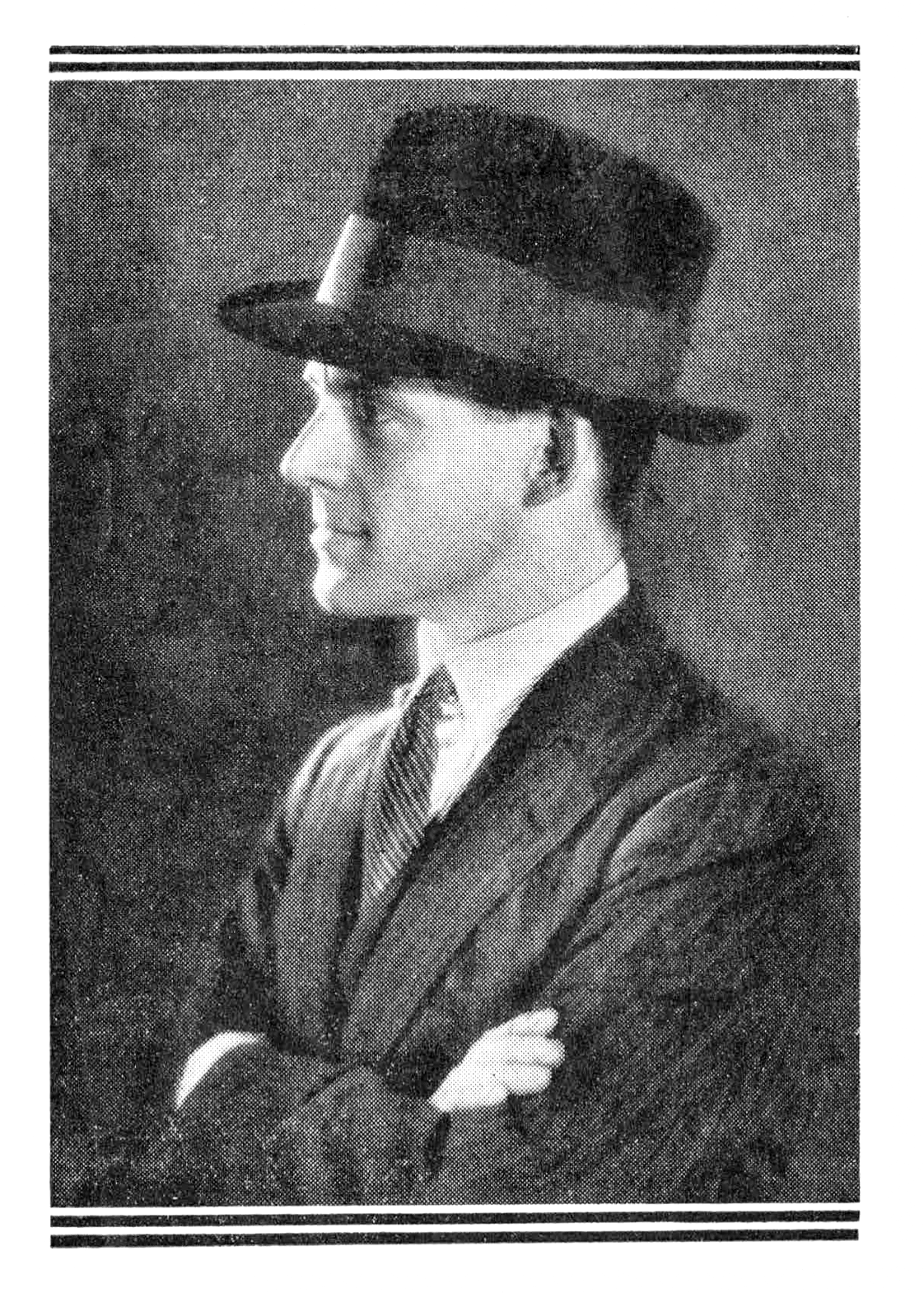
- Alan McCulloch c.1934
- Born: 5 August 1907; St Kilda, Victoria
- Died: 21 December 1992 (aged 85); Kew, Victoria
- Education: Scotch College; Working Men's College, Melbourne; National Gallery of Victoria Art School
- Spouse: Ellen Bromley Moscovitz (1908–1991)
- Children: Susan
- Relatives: Wilfred (brother)
- Writing career
- Years active: 1935–1991
- Genres: encyclopaedist, journalist, cartoonist, visual artist
- Subjects: art criticism, Australian art history, humour
- Notable work: The Encyclopedia of Australian Art
- Notable awards: Officer of the Order of Australia, Emeritus Medal, Australia Council

Alan McLeod McCulloch AO (5 August 1907 – 21 December 1992) was one of Australia's foremost art critics for more than 60 years, an art historian and gallery director, cartoonist, and painter.

== Early life ==
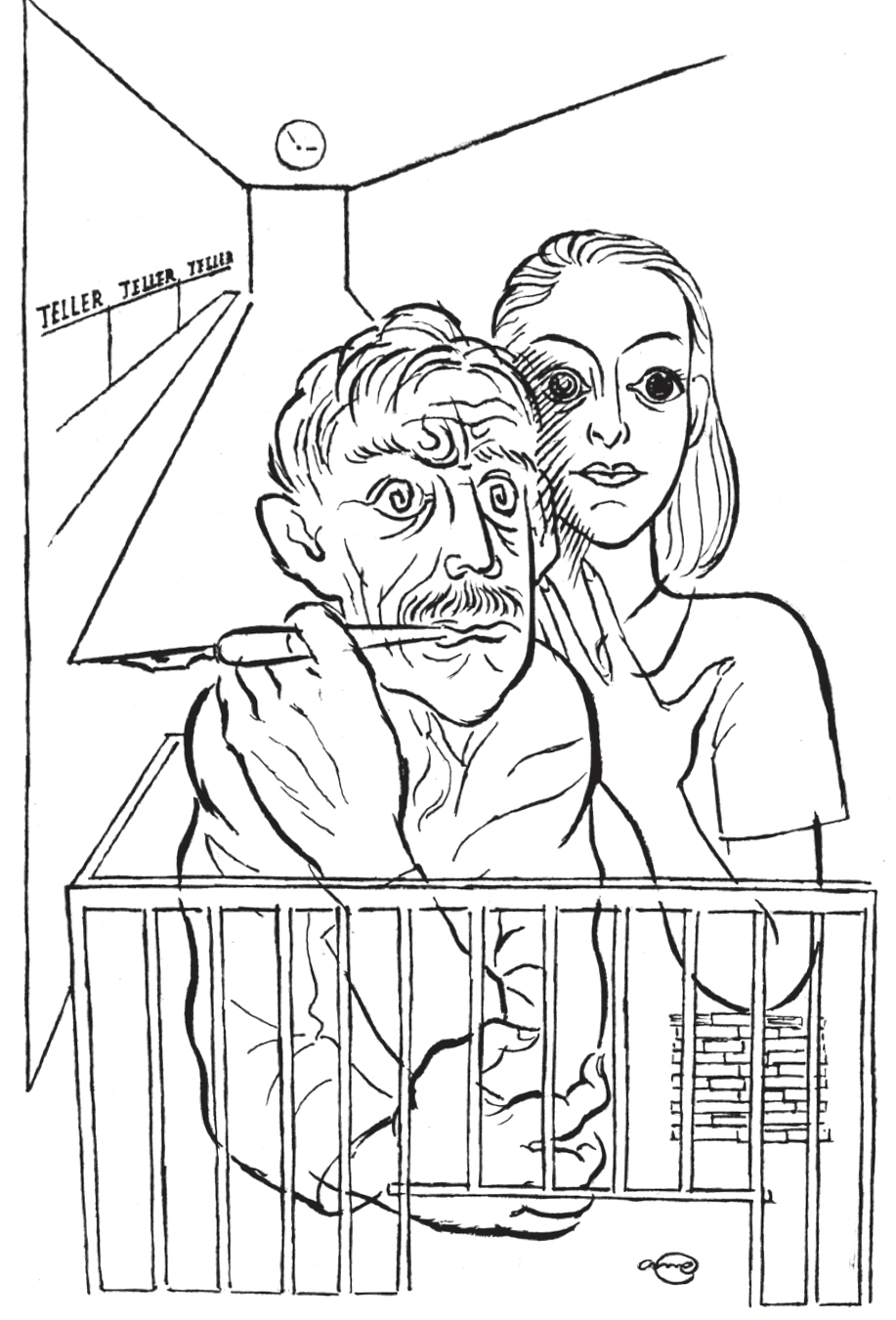
Drawing by Alan McCulloch of himself and his future wife c.1938. Reproduced in McCulloch’s Trial by Tandem, 1950.

Alan McLeod McCulloch was born to Annie (née Mcleod) and Alexander on 5 August 1907 in St Kilda in Melbourne, and brought up in Mosman, Sydney. His father encouraged a sense that "the arts were the most important thing in life," so Alan developed keen interest in art as a child. The family returned to Melbourne after his father died and when McCulloch was ten, living at 341 Malvern Rd. Malvern East. He attended Scotch College from 1920 to 1922 then went to work to support the family. Living at was employed in a clerical position at BHP in Melbourne, then worked as a teller with the Commonwealth Bank for eighteen years. Inspired in 1925 by hearing cartoonist Will Dyson speak on political satire and visiting his studio, he enrolled in night classes at the Working Men's College, and then the National Gallery School (1926–1935).

== Career ==
Having written a critique of William Dobell's 1943 The Billy Boy for the Argus, McCulloch was hired as its art critic from 1944 until 1947, and after the Second World War during which his artist brother Wilfred was killed fighting in the fall of Singapore, Alan became art editor under George Johnston of a new Argus weekly national magazine, Picture Post, to which he was also appointed as a cartoonist. Aspiring to the quality and status of the German cosmopolitan magazine Simplissimuss they published major Australian writers and commissioned illustrations from the 'Dunera boys' Frederick Schonbach, Erwin Fabian and Klaus Friedeberger, and other artists including Albert Tucker and Noel Counihan., but after three years were laid off for their even-handedness in ignoring directives requiring a bias against left-wing artists, when it became the Australasian Post with a very different ethos. He recalled;

Suddenly I was on top of the world. I started writing about all the people I thought were going to be good in the future. I published a lot of such as Arthur Boyd and Albert Tucker's drawings. It lasted three years. The Argus hated the things I wrote, regarding them as far too left-wing. I was regarded as a dangerous character.

Johnstone departed for Greece, and McCulloch to the United States from Sydney on the SS Marine Phoenix, accompanied by his mother Annie and a friend Gavin Casey. Having arrived in San Francisco on 2 May 1947 with only £1,000, he walked to Los Angeles. There, in 1948, he married Ellen Bromley Moscovitz (1908–1991) an Australian-born actress, businesswoman and US citizen. They remained together until her death in 1991.

Until 1949 he and his wife toured America, meeting Marcel Duchamp and other Surrealists, and McCullloch recorded their travels in Highway Forty while also writing magazine articles. The couple cycled on a tandem through Europe from Paris to Positano in Italy, and in Paris visited Georges Braque and developed a taste for the School of Paris artists, adventures about which he wrote in Trial by Tandem. They sailed from England for Australia on the RMS Strathmore on 26 October 1949.

Back in Australia in 1951 he became an associate editor for Meanjin (until 1963), and was invited by Keith Murdoch to be art critic on the Melbourne Herald, 1952–1982. During the 1960s he was appointed Australian correspondent for the European magazine Art Internatlonal, and established the annual Georges Invitation Art Prize.

As an artist, McCulloch held several solo exhibitions of his paintings and drawings in London and Melbourne.

As a curator, in 1965, he assembled an exhibition of Aboriginal bark paintings from the Chaseling and Cahill collections from the Museum of Victoria to tour to the USA (Museum of Fine Arts, Houston, Texas).

Living a maritime lifestyle at Shoreham on Western Port Bay, McCulloch became the inaugural director (1970–1992) of the Mornington Peninsula Regional Gallery, established in 1969 by the Mornington Shire Council, and it was under his leadership that the MPRG began developing a specialist collection of Australian prints and drawings. He was curator of The Heroic Years of Australian Art 1977–78 touring exhibition. In 1981, having retired from art criticism he worked in 1980 to raise funds for a new art centre building at Mornington which was opened by premier John Cain on 17 November 1991, shortly before McCulloch's retirement as director.

== The Encyclopedia of Australian Art ==
In 1968 McCulloch produced his most significant work, the Encyclopedia of Australian Art, with support from Voss Smith who had established a branch of Christie's in Melbourne, and who as the Australian representative for Hutchinson publishers convinced his London office to publish the monumental reference work, which started as a scrapbook of cuttings kept since the 1940s, and which became the main reference for connoisseurs, collectors, dealers, critics and historians of Australian art.

He was its sole author for several updates and reprints and a completely new edition, two-volume in 1984, then was joined by his daughter Susan McCulloch in 1990, who co-edited its third, 1994 edition. In that, McCulloch's personal note (one was included in each edition) was the last thing he wrote, just two weeks before he died. In it he says;

As with electricity we know what art does but we don't know what it is. Those who have tried to solve this problem have all concluded that the word 'art' cannot be defined. Support for this conclusion came from Murray in answer to a question about his Oxford English Dictionary; "the word "art" gave me more trouble than any other word in the English language."

His daughter Susan and his granddaughter Emily McCulloch Childs, specialists in Australian indigenous art, continued work on the Encyclopedia into the third generation, using the criteria established by Alan McCulloch in 1968; artists are chosen for inclusion if their work is represented by major purchases in a national, state, or regional gallery or if they have won a significant prize. The Encyclopedia is now in its 4th edition (2006).

== Legacy ==
After the death of Ellen his wife for 45 years, McCulloch, after recovering from an operation and suffering from Parkinson's disease, moved in March 1991 to a retirement home in Kew, and in his remaining months resumed making art and continued his friendships with visits from Louis Kahan, Albert Tucker and Andrew Sibley, and with his daughter Susan he worked on the 3rd edition of their Encyclopedia.

The move, and its expense, forced him, on 29 August 1991, to auction off his collection of 450 artworks and items of memorabilia at the Victorian Artists Society. Every lot sold, mostly to collectors and friends of the 84-year-old critic, writer and artist. Top price paid was $9000 for one of two oils by John Peter Russell, while Tom Roberts' blographer Andrew McKenzie bought The Australian Impressionist’s palette for $1200. Cartoons McCulloch drew for the Australasian Post fetched an average of $I00 each. The Age reported that even with the current downturn in the art market, many collectors picked up bargains.

McCulloch died in the aged accommodation on 21 December 1992, and was remembered as a stalwart champion of modernism for his Encyclopedia, and for his newspaper and magazine reviews defending and promoting work of Charles Blackman, John Brack. Leonard French, Julius Kane, Roger Kemp, Inge King, Clifford Last, Clement Meadmore, John Perceval, Clifton Pugh and Fred Williams. Though sceptical of color field abstraction, he nevertheless supported its individual proponents Sidney Ball, Janet Dawson, Robert Jacks and Jan Senbergs. In his obituary art critic Christopher Heathcote paid tribute to Alan McCulloch as...

...one of the great supporters of Modern Australian art. For more than 30 years he attempted to foster advanced painting and sculpture... The contemporary art scene as we know it today would not have developed without his resolute dedication to contemporary Australian culture... His writing may not have been concerned with complex ideas but this quiet and gentle man was arguably the most influential art critic to have practised in this country.

Arthur Boyd was a 15 year-old artist when McCulloch, and his brother Wilfred, also a painter, had encouraged him to pursue a career in art, and they enjoyed an enduring friendship, with Boyd living with the McCullochs in Shoreham where the men built a studio in which both painted. While in Europe in the 1940s, McCulloch had made lasting contacts with art critics and later founded an Australian branch of the International Association of Art Critics.

== Awards ==
- Officer of the Order of Australia (1976)
- Honorary doctorate from Melbourne University
- Emeritus Medal, Australia Council

== Exhibitions ==
- 1953: Melbourne Painters Exhibition, McCulloch with Charles Blackman, Arthur Boyd, John Brack, Leonard French, Roger Kemp, Stanislaus Ostoja-Kotkowski. Macquarie Galleries, Sydney, NSW
- 1991, to 22 April: Laughter on the Line, works commissioned by, or drawn by, McCulloch while arts editor of Australasian Post. Morington Peninsula Arts Centre

== Collections holding works by Alan McCulloch ==
- National Gallery of Australia, Canberra, ACT
- National Gallery of Victoria, Melbourne, Victoria
- Mornington Peninsula Regional Gallery, Victoria
- Art Gallery of Western Australia, Perth, Western Australia

== Publications ==
- McCulloch, Alan; McCulloch, Susan; McCulloch Childs, Emily (2006). The New McCulloch's Encyclopedia of Australian Art (4th ed.). Fitzroy: AUS Art Editions; Miegunyah Press. ISBN 0-522-85317-X. OCLC 80568976.
- McCulloch, Alan; & McCulloch, Susan. Encyclopedia of Australian art. 1994 St Leonards, NSW : Allen & Unwin (3rd revised edition)
- MacCulloch, Alan; Henshaw, John (1969). The Golden Age of Australian Painting : Impressionism and the Heidelberg School. Australian Art Library, Lansdowne. OCLC 716202343.
- McCulloch, Alan. Aboriginal bark paintings from the Cahill and Chaseling collections, National Museum of Victoria, Melbourne, Australia, Museum of Fine Arts, Houston, Texas. (catalogue of an exhibition, 17 December 1965 – 30 January 1966)
- McCulloch, Alan (1983). Selected Drawings from the Collections of the Mornington Peninsula Arts Centre. Mornington Peninsula Arts Centre. ISBN 0-9591265-0-3. OCLC 27620037.
- McCulloch, Alan; Regional Galleries Association of Victoria (1977). 1940–1965, the Heroic Years of Australian Painting : the Herald Exhibition. Melbourne: Herald & Weekly Times. OCLC 13821350.
- McCulloch, Alan; French, Leonard (1967). Leonard French, Australia. Catalogue of an exhibition held at the Commonwealth Institute Art Gallery, London, Tuesday 21st March – Sunday 16th April, 1967. Commonwealth Institute (Great Britain). OCLC 48867039.
- McCulloch, Alan (1977). Artists of the Australian Gold Rush. Lansdowne. ISBN 0-7018-0143-3. OCLC 7499741.

== Illustrated and written by McCulloch ==
- McCulloch, Alan. So This Was The Spot (Melbourne, 1934)
- McCulloch, Alan (1951). Trial by Tandem (2nd ed.). London: Allen & Unwin. OCLC 11348802.
- Alan, McCulloch (1951). Highway Forty. F. W. Cheshire. OCLC 2956451.
