= James Doolin =

American painter (1932–2002)

- Born: June 28, 1932; Hartford, Connecticut
- Died: July 22, 2002 (aged 70); Los Angeles, California
- Education: Pennsylvania Academy of the Fine Arts, University of California, Los Angeles
- Known for: Painting
- Movement: Independent

James Doolin (June 28, 1932 – July 22, 2002) was an American painter and muralist best known for his saturated natural and urban southern California landscapes. Los Angeles artist and writer Doug Harvey notes that his paintings allow us "to see the places we overlook every day and to recognize that, in spite of its ominous industrial overtones, the city is shot through with a luminous, electric vitality and a psychological potency verging on the mythic." Described as a "master of color and composition," his "evocative, moody paintings teemed with life."

== Early life and education ==
Doolin was born in Hartford, Connecticut, and moved with his parents and brother to the suburbs of Philadelphia when the artist was seven. The New England landscapes he encountered summering in Vermont would later prove influential in his work. During his primary school years, as the U.S. engaged in World War II, he became fixated with images of military hardware and battle scenes. As young as ten years old, the artist "worked through foreshortening issues" [with wing positions in aerial dogfight drawings] and "mastered the principles of perspective." Complex perspective would become a dominant motif throughout his career.

His father, a successful insurance salesman, wanted his son to follow him in a business career, but in 1950, Doolin applied to the University of Vermont with the intention of pursuing a liberal arts education. However, a teacher encouraged him to apply to Philadelphia's University of the Arts and he was awarded a full scholarship. The University of the Arts "provided him with a strong foundation and a new attitude about the value of art" and he credited the school with fostering his individual style.

== Travel and influences ==
The wide open spaces and vast scale Doolin encountered on a cross-country trip to the Rocky Mountains in his late teens opened the artist to new possibilities and experiences, and sparked three successive summers of hitchhiking excursions to Chicago and California, respectively. The latter two trips enabled him to assimilate both the natural beauty of Yosemite and the colorful and sometimes gritty cityscapes of San Francisco.

In 1954, stationed in Germany with the U.S. Army, Doolin enjoyed his first taste of Europe. This included visits to Munich's Haus der Kunst and Uffizi Gallery in Florence. Discharged from the army in 1957, Doolin moved to New York and worked as a freelance commercial artist in advertising for the next four years, creating art in his limited spare time. Despite the cultural stimulation New York offered, Doolin was unsatisfied professionally and artistically, and took on extra work to save money for an extended trip to Europe in 1961. Doolin subsequently embarked on what might best be described as a cultural pilgrimage to some of the major art and historical centers of Europe. The artist was particularly influenced by works of Dutch and Italian Renaissance masters and contemporary abstract artists.

Re-energized, Doolin settled into a rented a house on the island of Rhodes and painted, inspired by the mosaics he had viewed throughout southern Europe, and most notably, Ravenna, Italy. His work during this period featured jewel-like patterns and bright colors. The "frontal structure" and "flattened space" of these smaller paintings would become enduring influences in his later work. While in Greece, Doolin met and later married Leslie Edwards, a young Australian woman. The artist, returning to New York stimulated by his marriage and extended stay in Europe, was now "fiercely determined to be a painter."

== Artificial landscapes ==
Returning to New York, Doolin again worked as a commercial artist, painting in his spare time. Inspired by Al Held and other Hard-Edge painters, he began working on a series of "geometric abstract paintings that would become known as Artificial Landscapes." These landscapes dealt with man-made as opposed to natural environments, and "related directly to the streetscapes of his [Greenwich Village] neighborhood - road signs, building walls, darkened doorways, and billboards from the semi-industrial area close to the docks." These works were "often divided horizontally and compartmentalized into blocks of geometric patterns to reflect the flat, bold forms within the urban landscape." The artist achieved a greater sense of artificiality using "harsh, inorganic colors absent from nature."

In 1965, at the suggestion of his wife, the couple and their two sons moved to her native Melbourne, where the artist took a teaching position and where in 1966, at Gallery A, he secured his first solo exhibition. The critical response was largely unfavorable. Doolin fared much better in Sydney, a city at that time more receptive to the New York-inspired aesthetic of the period, with a well-received exhibition of his Artificial Landscapes at Central Street Gallery in 1967.

Wanting to further his education in order to secure a better teaching position in the future, the Doolin family moved to Los Angeles shortly after his Sydney show, and Doolin soon enrolled in the MFA program at the University of California, Los Angeles. In 1968, he was asked to participate in The Field, the inaugural exhibition for the reopening of the National Gallery of Victoria. He sent three new paintings which were highly praised by several critics, and subsequently acquired by Australia's three principle art museums. In 1969, he began painting a new series of "luminous and ethereal" Artificial Landscapes with a "minimalist aesthetic" known as the Arch Series. Central Street Gallery contacted Doolin in 1970 to mount a second show, and he sent nine of his new Artificial Landscapes. This show was an unqualified critical and financial success.

== Western landscapes ==
In Los Angeles, Doolin's work became more representational, following his desire to create "more 'traditional' illusionistic paintings from direct observation." The artist spent much of his two years at UCLA "painting illusionistically -- observed reality, dreams, fantasies, and memories." The following year, he became an instructor at the university while furthering his exploration of illusionistic painting.

Photorealism and Conceptual Art had emerged to become two of the dominant styles during this period, and both of these movements influenced the artist's epic work Shopping Mall. Doolin spent four years (1973–77) working on this piece, "a large-scale, detailed aerial view of the intersection of Arizona Avenue and Third Street in Santa Monica -- which established his reputation as an important contemporary interpreter of the Western landscape." The artist "spent the first two years sketching and photographing the site from every possible rooftop vantage point, then constructed a highly detailed diagonal composition of a busy intersection." The painting was the principle work of a solo exhibition at the Los Angeles Municipal Art Gallery at Barnsdall Park in 1977, garnering enthusiastic reviews. The piece was then sent on a national tour of Australia in 1978, with stops in seven cities.

In 1980, on the heels of this latest success and the dissolution of his marriage, Doolin was awarded a three-year Guggenheim Foundation Fellowship, which allowed the artist to relocate to a remote stretch of the Mojave Desert to paint. "The austere beauty of the desert had fascinated him since his hitchhiking trips west in the 1950s" and he found inspiration for his art during this period by drawing on the unique elements of the desert landscape.

He returned to the urban environment of Los Angeles in 1983, and by the 1990s he had begun documenting the city, painting many of his best known works. In his signature rendering of "negative social spaces -- bus stops, empty billboards, the dry trough of the L.A. River, the concrete islands between freeway onramps," the artist achieved an unlikely marriage between the "lurid sublimity of California landscape tradition" and "postindustrial apocalyptic melancholy.".

== Collections, awards and reputation ==
Doolin's art work is included in many public and corporate collections and is also represented in numerous books on America." He was the recipient of a Guggenheim Fellowship and three National Endowment for the Arts grants in 1981, 1986, and 1992. Throughout his career, Doolin struggled against "the L.A. art establishment's prejudice against pictorialism and regionalism," but he eventually earned the respect of critics, collectors and fellow artists. Australian writer Peter Carey noted that Doolin was a "risk-taker, [whose] choice of subject matter was often unfashionable." Upon Doolin's death, artist Carl Cheng described him as a West Coast Edward Hopper, capturing "both the beauty and the alienation of our time in Los Angeles." After his masterful, incandescent painting Psychic headlined the traveling exhibition "Representing L.A.," (2000–2002) and the San Jose Museum of Art held a retrospective of his work in 2001, his reputation as a major Los Angeles artist solidified.
