= Alun Leach-Jones =

British- Australian artist

- Born: 1937; Maghull, Lancashire, England, UK arrived Australia 1960
- Known for: Painting, Drawing, Printmaking, Screen Printing, Sculpture

Alun Leach-Jones (1937 – 24 December 2017), was a British-born Australian artist known for his range of work covering painting, drawing, sculpture, linocuts, screenprints and etchings.

== Early life ==
Born in Maghull, Lancashire, in the UK, his family moved to the village of Glasfryn in North Wales where he spent his childhood. In 1951, age 14, he began a three-year apprenticeship with the Solicitors Law Stationery Society Limited in Liverpool, where he was employed as a painter of illuminated manuscripts. He studied art at the Liverpool College of Art from 1955 to 1957 before moving to Adelaide, Australia in 1960, where he studied printmaking at the South Australian School of Art under Udo Sellbach.

== Work ==
During 1964–65, Leach-Jones moved back to London, where he produced screenprints influenced by the British pop art of fellow artists Patrick Caulfield and Eduardo Paolozzi. He returned to Australia and settled in Melbourne in 1966.

During the sixties, Leach-Jones was recognized as part of what was then called "the New Abstraction" in Australian art. His work developed into a style still known as Hard-edge painting. Alun Leach-Jones was included in the now notorious 1968 The Field exhibition held at the National Gallery of Victoria.

In 1971 Leach-Jones received a Master Diploma from the National Gallery of Victoria Art School in Melbourne.

In 1978, he painted a permanent mural called Sydney Summer for Macquarie University in Sydney.

In 1979, he painted a mural called Crossing to Capricorn for Griffith University in Brisbane.

== Exhibitions ==
- 1968 The Field, National Gallery of Victoria, Melbourne
- 1964–92 Australian Galleries, Melbourne
- 1967–1972 Watters Gallery, Sydney
- 1970–84 Ray Hughes Gallery, Brisbane
- 1976–82 Rudy Komon Gallery, Sydney
- 1976–86 Solander Gallery, Canberra
- 1987–91 Luise Ross Gallery, New York, USA
- 2005–12 Rex Irwin Art Dealer, Sydney

== Collections ==
- Solomon R. Guggenheim Museum, New York
- Museum of Modern Art, New York
- National Gallery of Australia, Canberra
- Art Gallery of New South Wales
- Art Gallery of South Australia
- National Gallery of Victoria
- Queensland Art Gallery, Brisbane
- Art Gallery of Western Australia, Perth
- National Museum Cardiff
- British Museum, London
- Victoria and Albert Museum, London
- Ashmolean Museum, Oxford
- Glynn Vivan Art Gallery, Swansea
- Museum of Modern Art, Machynlleth, Wales
- Walker Art Gallery, Liverpool
- National Gallery of Malaysia, Kuala Lumpur
- National Performing Arts Centre, Bombay
- Parliament House Collection, Canberra
- Auckland City Art Gallery, New Zealand
- Perth Cultural Centre, Western Australia
- Bendigo Art Gallery, Victoria
- Art Bank, Sydney
- Western Sydney University Art collection
- Castlemaine Art Museum

== Awards ==
- 1985 Fremantle Print Award
- 1999 Honorary Life Fellow of the Royal Society of Painter-Printmakers, London
