= Jan Riske =

Dutch painter (1932–2023)

Jan Hendrik Riske (21 June 1932 – 16 October 2023) was a Dutch contemporary painter who was active in Australia.

== Biography ==
Jan Hendrik Riske was born in Dordrecht on 21 June 1932. He went to a private Montessori school and was encouraged to draw by his father. Riske was noticed by Laurens J. Bol, director of the Dordrechts Museum. With the financial support from the Ary Scheffer Fund, obtained through the influence of Bol, Riske was able to study at the Art Academy in Rotterdam. After his studies at the art academy in Rotterdam he emigrated to Australia in 1952.

Riske died on 16 October 2023, at the age of 91.

== Work ==
His work was on exposition at the Museum of Modern Art in Melbourne, the Carnegie International in Pittsburgh and galleries in Amsterdam, New York, Sydney and Melbourne.

These museums have works of Jan Riske on display:

- National Gallery of Australia, Canberra
- Fine Arts Museum, Dallas, United States

Numerous key galleries and museums such as Annandale Galleries have featured Jan Riske's work in the past.

Jan Riske's work has been offered at auction multiple times, with realized prices ranging from 79 USD to 1,158 USD, depending on the size and medium of the artwork.

Since 2017 the record price for this artist at auction is 1,158 USD for 'Cosmic curtain', sold at de Zwaan Auction House in 2021.
