= George Johnson (artist) =

Australian artist (1926–2021)

- Born: 18 August 1926; Nelson, New Zealand
- Died: 26 December 2021 (aged 95)
- Education: Theo Schoon
- Known for: Painting
- Notable work: Mount of the Blue Triangle
- Movement: Constructivism
- Relatives: Louis Johnson (brother); Tu'u'u Ieti Taulealo (son-in-law)
- Awards: Albury Art Prize (1966); Orange Art Prize (1971); Visual Arts Board of the Australia Council Grant (1973, 1977); George's Invitation Art Purchase Prize (1975)

George Henry Johnson (18 August 1926 – 26 December 2021) was a New Zealand artist who made his name in Australia.

== Artistic career ==
=== Early career ===
Johnson studied art under the emigre artist Theo Schoon, who confirmed an early commitment to modernist art, especially Geometric Abstraction. He graduated from Wellington Technical College in 1947.

Johnson took influence from Dutch De Stijl, otherwise known as Neoplasticism. This Dutch art movement was based around architecturally structured pieces, similar to how you may view many of Johnson's works. Growing up, this artistic influence was significant as it was at the height of its popularity during Johnson's most impressionable years.

=== Move to Australia ===
Johnson relocated to Melbourne, Australia, in 1951 where he was soon drawn into contemporary art circles, mixing with Leonard French, Roger Kemp, Inge King, Julius Kane, Peter Graham, Clement Meadmore and others. He held his first solo exhibition there at the age of 30 in 1956, a selection of boldly geometric abstractions that set the art scene buzzing. By this time he was sharing a studio with French and the pair experienced increasing friction from the Heide Circle, a rival group of figurative modernists—including Arthur Boyd, John Perceval, Charles Blackman and Robert Dickerson—who were still trying to control the Contemporary Art Society. The latter artists eventually formed the Antipodeans Group, staging an exhibition in August 1959, initially to make a stand against Johnson, French, Kemp and a growing number of non-objectivist followers, although increasingly to express their opposition to American Abstract Expressionism, which they feared was about to overwhelm Australian art.

Johnson was represented by the Charles Nodrum Gallery in Richmond. He remained unwaveringly committed to geometric abstraction, producing paintings that were stylistically and intellectually indebted to Russian Constructivism.

== Personal life ==
Johnson was the father of noted Pasifika artist Vanya Taule'alo, and the brother of poet and author Louis Johnson. He died on 26 December 2021, at the age of 95.

== See also ==
- Art of Australia
