= Ann Thomson =

Australian painter and sculptor

- Born: 1933 (age 92–93)
- Education: National Art School
- Known for: Painting, Sculpture
- Movement: Modernism, Abstract art
- Awards: Wynne Prize (1998)

Ann Thomson (born 1933) is an Australian painter and sculptor. She is best known for her large-scale public commissions Ebb Tide (1987) for the Sydney Convention and Exhibition Centre and Australia Felix (1992) for the Seville World Expo. In 1998 she won the Art Gallery of New South Wales' Wynne Prize. Her work is held in national and international collections, including: the National Gallery of Australia, Canberra; Art Gallery of New South Wales, Sydney, Newcastle Art Gallery, Newcastle, Thyssen-Bornemisza Collection, Madrid and Villa Haiss Museum, Germany.

== Early life and education ==
Ann Thomson was born in 1933 in Brisbane. She went to Somerville House, a private school in Brisbane also attended by Margaret Olley, Betty Churcher and art historian Joan Kerr. After school, she took painting classes with Richard Rodier Rivron and Jon Molvig. In 1957, Thomson moved to Sydney where she studied at the East Sydney Technical College (now the National Art School), graduating in 1962. She focused on drawing, sculpture and painting. During her education, she was taught by Godfrey Miller, John Passmore, John Olsen, Lyndon Dadswell, David Strachan and Dorothy Thornhill. While a young artist she also visited leading Australian modernist Ian Fairweather on Bribie Island, Queensland.

== Career ==
Thomson sold her first painting through Clune Gallery, in Sydney. Her first commercial exhibition in 1965 was with Watters Gallery, Sydney, a significant venue for experimental works. In 1977, Thomson had a solo exhibition at the Institute of Modern Art in Brisbane.

In 1983, Thomson's work Pentaplain was a finalist in the Art Gallery of New South Wales' Wynne Prize for landscape paintings. The work is part figurative, with references to built structures, and part abstract with large areas of blue and green. It combines aerial and horizontal perspectives. 15 years later, she won the Wynne Prize with her work Yellow sound. This brilliant yellow oil on canvas combines various mark-making techniques including drips, layering and erasure. Her major commission Australia Felix was the central sculptural installation for the Australian Pavilion at the 1992 World Expo in Seville. The 11-metre wide work was subsequently installed at Sydney Darling Harbour. She has also won the Geelong Contemporary Art Prize (2002), and the Tattersall's Art Prize, Brisbane (2016).

In 2015 she was honoured with a Fellowship by the National Art School, Sydney. NAS followed this with an exhibition titled Ann Thomson and Contemporaries. The two-level gallery dedicated the upper floor to Thomson. Craig Judd favourably reviewed the exhibition, writing: "Ann Thomson and Contemporaries is a richly enjoyable exhibition". It "confirms without doubt the stature of Ann Thomson within the canons of Australian abstract art as teacher, mentor and leader".

In 2020, Thomson was among 500 artists calling on the Australian Government to support creatives through COVID-19.

As of 2012, Thomson was painting every day, generally working on multiple canvases at once and painting from memory, rather than directly from real life. Her earlier works were aligned with Abstract expressionism, while her later works oscillate between abstraction and figuration, taking inspiration from the landscape. Thomson says: "I don't feel as though I am totally abstract" and "I might abstract something but I don't just paint shapes".

Thomson continues to exhibit, making for a career of solo exhibitions that extends beyond half a century.

== Recognition and awards ==
- 1976: David Jones Art Prize, Brisbane
- 1978: Visual Arts Board Grant to Cité internationale des Arts, Paris
- 1980: Visual Arts Board Grant
- 1981: Winner, Canberra Times National Art Award
- 1984: University of New South Wales Purchase Prize
- 1985: The Sydney Morning Herald Art Prize
- 1986: John McCaughey Prize
- 1998: Wynne Prize, Art Gallery of New South Wales, Sydney
- 2002: Geelong Contemporary Art Prize for Change Takes Time
- 2005: Kedumba Drawing Prize
- 2017: Tattersalls Art Prize, Brisbane.

== Major exhibitions ==
- 1965: Watters Gallery, Sydney
- 1973: Gallery One Eleven, Brisbane
- 1974: Gallery A, Sydney
- 1977: Institute of Modern Art, Brisbane
- 1977: Gallery A, Sydney
- 1979: Gallery A, Sydney
- 1980: Monash University, Melbourne
- 1982: Gallery A, Sydney
- 1988: Australian Galleries, Melbourne
- 1989: Australian Galleries, Melbourne
- 1992: Australian Galleries, Sydney
- 1993: Australian Galleries, Melbourne, in conjunction with Meridian Sculpture Gallery
- 1993: Art Gallery of NSW Sculpture 'Australia Felix'
- 1994: Australian Galleries, Sydney
