= Normana Wight =

Australian artist (1936–2026)

- Born: 9 March 1936
- Died: 31 January 2026 (aged 89)
- Education: Royal Melbourne Institute of Technology, Central School of Arts and Crafts
- Occupation: Artist
- Known for: Painting, printmaking
- Movement: Abstract art

Normana Wight (9 April 1936 – 31 January 2026) was an Australian artist, best known as a painter and printmaker.

== Early life and education ==
Wight studied painting at Royal Melbourne Institute of Technology (1954–57) and after a short time as a fabric designer and high school art teacher, later studied printmaking at Central School of Arts and Crafts, London (1962–63). Upon returning to Australia in 1964 she moved to Sydney, then Mittagong, New South Wales. She returned to Melbourne in 1967 to teach at the Preston Institute of Technology.

== Life and career ==
Wight's initial work focused on abstract forms in fields of bright colour.

In 1967, Wight's work came to the attention of Brian Finemore and John Stringer, co-curators of the seminal exhibition The Field at the National Gallery of Victoria in 1968. Wight is one of only three women artists to have work included in The Field, the others being Janet Dawson and Wendy Paramor. Wight was represented by a large painting in two parts hung vertically, 'Untitled' 1968 (cat. no. 74). She later had to destroy the work as it was too large and awkward to store. Wight's minimal abstraction was then largely forgotten for three decades until gallerist David Pestorius shone a light on it in the exhibitions Queensland Art 2009 and Normana Wight: Minimal Painting at his Brisbane gallery in 2009 and 2010 respectively. In 2017, Wight remade her work for The Field for the National Gallery of Victoria's exhibition 'The Field Revisited' 2018, and the remade work was acquired by the Gallery.

In the early 1970s, Wight shifted focus from and began using photographic sources for her works. Whilst she had produced prints in conjunction with her abstract paintings in her earlier works, printmaking soon became her primary medium, and through her production of postcards and books she sought to challenge ideas of commodification and elitism.

Between 1981 and 1986, Wight was printmaking lecturer at the University of Southern Queensland, Toowoomba.

Wight later became interested in computer-generated imagery. In 2000, she collaborated with the Victorian Tapestry Workshop on their first portrait commission, a portrait of Dame Elisabeth Murdoch, AC, DBE for the National Portrait Gallery, Canberra. The image was composed by painter Christopher Pyett, adapted on computer by Wight and woven by Merrill Dumbrell.

Wight lived and worked in Brisbane from 2001, and was represented by Grahame Galleries + Editions, Brisbane.

In 2014 Normana Wight was interviewed in a digital story and oral history for the State Library of Queensland's James C Sourris AM Collection. In the interview Wight talks to Brisbane gallery owner, Noreen Grahame about her art, her artistic career, the influence computer technology has had on her art and her future aspirations.

Wight died on 31 January 2026, at the age of 89.

== Work ==
=== Solo exhibitions ===
- Normana Wight: Minimal Painting, Pestorius Sweeney House, Brisbane, 2010
- Posted, Grahame Galleries + editions, Brisbane, 2009
- Pursuing the Still Life, Grahame Galleries + editions, Brisbane, 2003
- Small Ceremonies: Normana Wight, Lismore Regional Art Gallery, Lismore, 2000
- Extracts from a Still Life, Grahame Galleries + editions, Brisbane, 1999
- Recent Work - collage and laser prints, Grahame Galleries + editions, Brisbane, 1994
- Work-in-progress: the balancing act, Queensland College of Art Gallery, Griffith University, 1993.
- Normana Wight: recent work, Grahame Galleries, 1990

=== Group exhibitions ===
- New Woman, Museum of Brisbane, 2019-2020
- The Field Revisited, National Gallery of Victoria, 2018
- Abstraction: celebrating Australian women artists, National Gallery of Australia, touring exhibition, 2017
- Queensland Art 2009, Pestorius Sweeney House, Brisbane, 2009-2010
- Fremantle Print Award exhibition, Fremantle, WA, 1994
- Artist books exhibition, Grahame Galleries, 1991
- Shifting Parameters, Queensland Art Gallery, 1990
- The Field, National Gallery of Victoria, 1968

=== Public collections ===
- National Gallery of Australia
- Queensland Art Gallery | Gallery of Modern Art
- Art Gallery of New South Wales
- National Gallery of Victoria
- Art Gallery of South Australia
- Monash University Museum of Art
- Museum of Brisbane
- State Library of Queensland
- Griffith University Art Museum
- University of Southern Queensland, Toowoomba
- University of Queensland Art Museum

=== Awards and nominations ===
Wight was recognised for her contributions to Australian art through institutional fellowships and residencies.

- Visiting Fellow – Queensland College of Art, Brisbane, 1993.
- Artist Residency – Victorian Tapestry Workshop, Melbourne, 2001.
