= Robert Jacks =

Australian painter, sculptor and printmaker (1943-2014)

- Born: 8 March 1943; Melbourne, Australia
- Died: 14 August 2014 (aged 71); Castlemaine, Victoria, Australia
- Education: RMIT University
- Known for: Painting
- Movement: Abstract
- Awards: Order of Australia

Robert Jacks (8 March 1943, Melbourne – 14 August 2014, Castlemaine) was an Australian painter, sculptor and printmaker and acknowledged as one of Australia's leading abstract artists.

== Early life and career ==
Jacks was born in Melbourne, Australia and after a brief stint as a boxer began studying sculpture from 1958 to 1960 at the Prahran Technical College, Melbourne, then painting in 1961 and 1962 at the Royal Melbourne Institute of Technology (now RMIT University).

In 1966 he had his first solo exhibition at Gallery A, Melbourne from which a work was purchased for the collection of the National Gallery of Victoria. In 1968, he participated in The Field, held at the new National Gallery of Victoria building in St Kilda Road, an influential exhibition which effectively launched color field abstraction in Australia.

He taught at Rochedale College, Toronto, before moving to a studio at 96 Greene Street, Soho in 1969, where he associated with Melbourne expatriate John Stringer at the Museum of Modern Art, artists John Davis, Ian Burn, Mel Ramsden and the gallerist Max Hutchison, as well as American minimalist and avant-garde artists such as Sol LeWitt and Brice Marden. Ian Burn noted in September 1970, that Jacks’ ‘recent work in New York has moved beyond painting into conceptualized presentation of numeral systems and serial techniques’.

Jacks returned to Melbourne in 1978 to be artist-in-residence at the University of Melbourne.

The winner of many art awards and prizes, he has exhibited consistently in Australia since 1966 in more than 50 solo exhibitions, including retrospectives. In 2001 the Bendigo Art Gallery established the Robert Jacks Drawing Prize. In 2006, he was named an Officer of the Order of Australia (AO).

His mature work, while emerging out of the international abstract 'color field' movement of the late '60s, retains an ambiguous link to the representation of appearances, especially of objects in space.

"I think my work has always been minimal and abstract because when I was being taught sculpture, it was expressed in abstract terms. Form in space, mass and volume - that sort of thing. Painting, for me, is an extension of sculptural ideas."

In the latter part of his life Jack lived in Harcourt, and died from complications of asthma at Castlemaine Hospital.

== Collections ==
- Castlemaine Art Museum
- Bendigo Art Gallery
- National Gallery of Victoria
