= Elaine Haxton =

Australian artist (1909–1999)

Elaine Alys Haxton
- Elaine Haxton, Australia, c. 1950
- Born: 26 September 1909; Newmarket, Melbourne
- Died: 6 July 1999
- Known for: Painting, Costume Design, Theatre backdrops
- Spouse: Brigadier Richard Cunningham Foot
- Awards: Sir John Sulman Prize, Order of Australia

Elaine Alys Haxton, AM (26 September 1909 – 6 July 1999) was an Australian painter, printmaker, designer and commercial artist.

== Biography ==
Haxton was born in the north Melbourne suburb of Newmarket. Her family moved to Sydney when she was a young child and she attended the East Sydney Technical School from 1924 to 1928. The art critic for the Sydney Morning Herald commented her graduating work manifested "a fine grasp of composition and colour". She spent some time working for Raynor Hoff following an early interest in sculpture, and then some time in the art department of David Jones before she travelled to London in 1933. She attended the Grosvenor School of Art but to achieve this worked as a commercial artist at J. Walter Thompson. She also found time to travel around Europe, usually by train with a rucksack. She visited France, Germany and Spain and was accompanied by Australian sculptor Eileen McGrath. At the end of the 1930s she visited New York and returned to Australia via Mexico at the outbreak of war. Her friends and contemporaries in Sydney were Russell Drysdale, Donald Friend and William Dobell. Her portrait by Dobell was a finalist in the 1941 Archibald Prize.

She was one of five women artists exhibited at the Australian Commercial and Industrial Artists Association (ACIAA)'s first Sydney exhibition in 1940, three years after the association's founding in 1937.

In 1943 she won the Sir John Sulman Prize for a mural commissioned by restaurateur Walter Magnus for Le Coq D'Or Restaurant, Ash Street, Sydney. The mural, since painted over, was inspired by the Ballets Russes production of Le Coq D'Or. She had previously completed a series of seven murals for his Kings Cross Claremont Cafe. Haxton lived for a time in Dutch New Guinea producing costumes and sets for a ballet company.

In 1946 she won the Ballarat Crouch Prize for Painting with her painting Mother and Child and returned to New York to attend the New York School for New Design.

In 1954, PIX magazine described her as "having a feeling for colour and design" and had "gay paintings hanging in New York and most National Galleries in Australia". The same year Haxton designed costumes and scenery for the Borovansky Ballet's touring production of Los Tres Diabolos based on Offenbach's opera. When Haxton undertook to create and design both costumes and the theatre sets, she felt "a bit appalled at taking on such a tremendous job - especially as I was preparing for my one-man exhibition at the time", and after ensuring that her ideas were practical, "I set to work and have thoroughly enjoyed doing it". Her exhibition at the Macquarie Galleries was well received and James Cook, art critic for The Daily Telegraph found she had lost "none of her earlier adventurous spirit".

Haxton continued to create large backdrops for other Borovansky productions, and turned her interest towards printmaking. She trained in Paris at Atelier 17, the studio of Stanley William Hayter in 1967 at Rue Moulin Vert. Haxton was able to combine travel with work and in 1972 spent time in Bali, Sumatra and Java researching and creating a series of illustrations for Maslyn Williams"s book The Story of Indonesia.

In 1986 Haxton was made a Member of the Order of Australia for "services to the arts, particularly printmaking".

Haxton's painting GI Jeeps in New Guinea was included in the Australian War Memorial's 1995 exhibition Through women's eyes: Australian women artists and war 1914 - 1996. Senior art critic for the Canberra Times, Sasha Grishin, commented her large painting created "an almost surreal setting where the combatants with their toy-like equipment, ... dwarfed by the grandeur of nature".

Haxton married Brigadier Richard Cunningham Foot, OBE, MC in 1954 and they moved to Clareville, Sydney.
