= Stanislav Rapotec =

Slovene-Australian artist

Stanislav Ivan Rapotec AM (4 October 1913 – 18 November 1997) was a Slovene-Australian artist.

== Early life ==
Rapotec was born in 1913 in Trieste, at that time part of the Austro-Hungarian Empire. In 1918 he moved with his family to Ljubljana, part of the newly created Yugoslavia. He studied economics at the University of Zagreb from 1933 to 1939. After military training as a reserve officer, he began his career with the National Bank of Yugoslavia in Split where he also developed his skill as an artist.

== World War II ==
Rapotec was mobilized into the Royal Yugoslav Army before the invasion of Yugoslavia by Germany and Italy on 6 April 1941. He was taken prisoner by the Germans, but subsequently escaped to Split controlled by the Italian army. He escaped to Split, where he fought for the Yugoslavian government in exile. He had also visited Jerusalem, where he met Julian Amery of the British Special Operations Executive. In January 1942, he covertly returned to Split. Žarko Todorović, the leader of the Chetnik resistance, also organized radio communication between Rapotec and Draža Mihailović. He spent April to June of that year in Zagreb. During this time, he met with the Archbishop of Zagreb Aloysius Stepinac five times. Later in July, he went back to the middle eastern region. He was feared lost by the allies. He has traveled from Split to Mostar to Zagreb (where he had sheltered for 2 1/2 months and met surviving Jews and Serbs) to Belgrade, and finally to Turkey.

== Life as a painter ==
After the war, Rapotec moved to Adelaide, South Australia, where he started to paint again. In 1955, he moved to Sydney, New South Wales. He started using his name in an Anglicized form (Stanislaus, or simply Stan). In 1961, he won the Blake Prize for Religious Art. He was a member of the group of Sydney-based abstract artists called the Sydney 9. After his wife, Andree, had died, he traveled and painted all across Europe. He died in Sydney from a stroke in 1997.

== Legacy ==
Stan Rapotec is famous for his art works, which are all exhibited in London, Rome, Paris, and the United States. He is also known for his quote, "To become an artist, you must have a life rich with experience, a strong desire to express yourself, a will strong enough to carry out this desire, and ... talent,".
