= John Coburn (painter) =

Australian artist

John Coburn AM (23 September 1925 – 7 November 2006) was an Australian abstract painter, teacher, tapestry designer and printmaker.

Born in Ingham, Queensland, John Coburn moved from town to town with his mother and two younger sisters when his bank manager father went from branch to branch. His father died when the boy was 10.

While enlisted in the Royal Australian Navy during World War II, Coburn travelled around the Pacific and Indian oceans as a radio operator. He drew images from these places whilst aboard HMAS Nepal, including Sri Lanka, Papua New Guinea and others.

Coburn studied art at East Sydney Technical College in 1947. He finished his four-year training dissatisfied:

I'd learned to paint portraits and landscapes and to draw from the human figure ... but at the end I said 'So what; what's it good for?'

By 1955–1956 Coburn was starting to find his own style. In 1969 he told The Canberra Times :

It's a flat-patterned style of painting, using brilliant colour combinations based on natural or organic images.

In 1956 he joined the ABC when television came in. He specialised in set design and artwork.

Coburn taught art at East Sydney Technical College from 1959 to 1966 and he later became Head of the National Art School at the College for two years.

He won the Blake Prize for Religious Art twice, in 1960 and again in 1977 (shared with Rodney Milgate). In 1996 he won the Mandorla Art Award.

Major galleries in Australia have collected and displayed Coburn's works, many of which can now be found in major private and corporate collections, such as the Cbus Collection of Australian Art. For several years, two of his tapestries were hung in the Sydney Opera House, as curtains in the Drama Theatre and the (recently renamed) Joan Sutherland Theatre. Seven hang in the John F. Kennedy Center for the Performing Arts, Washington D.C. His works are also displayed in the Vatican Museum, Rome.
