= Roger Kemp =

Australian artist

Dr. (h.c.) Roger Kemp AO, OBE
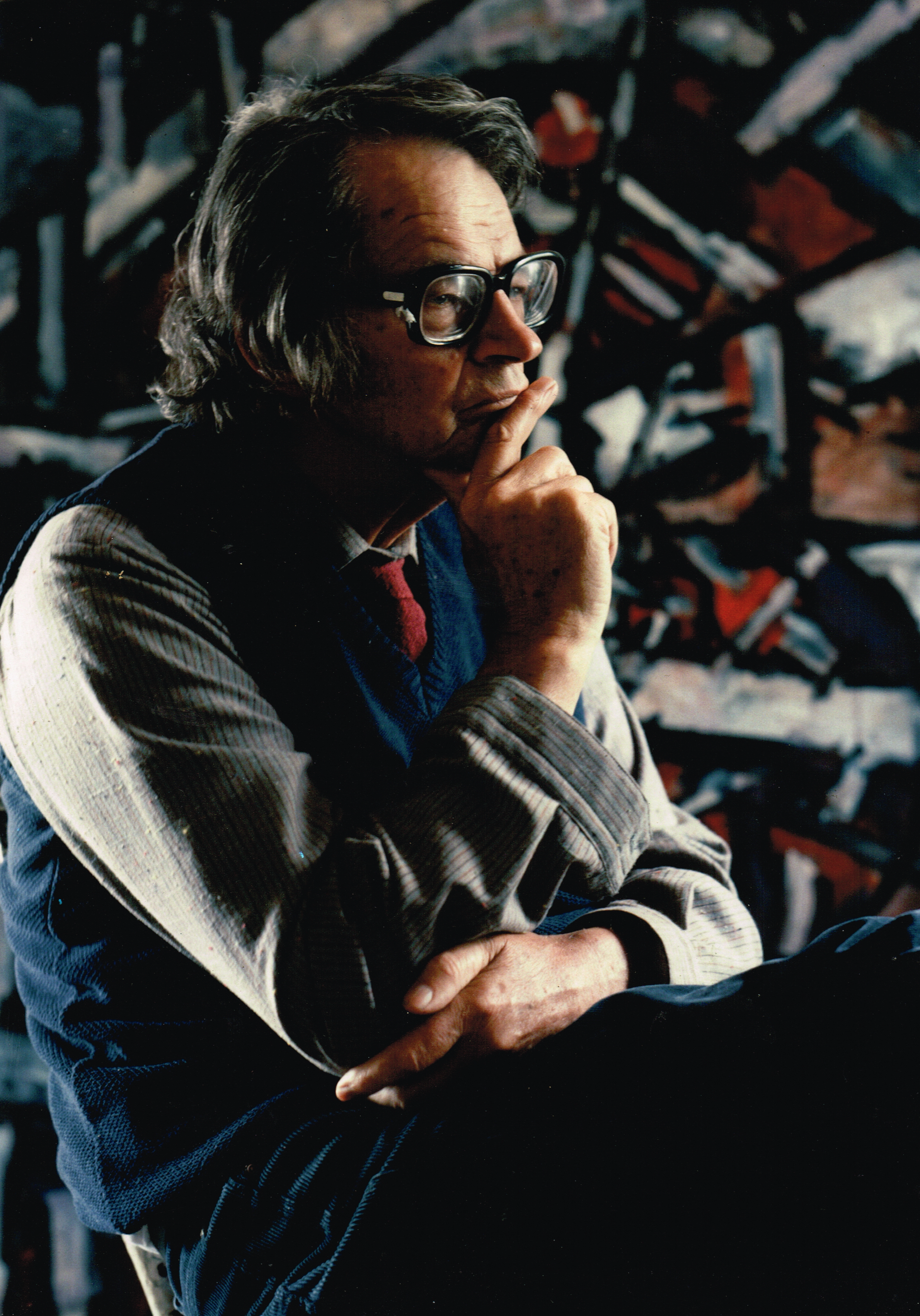
- Born: Francis Roderick Kemp; 3 July 1908; California Gully, Eaglehawk, Victoria, Australia
- Died: 14 November 1987 (aged 79); Sandringham, Victoria, Australia
- Occupation: Artist
- Known for: Transcendental abstraction, abstract painting, printmaking
- Website: https://www.roger-kemp.com

Roger Kemp AO OBE (3 July 1908 – 14 November 1987) was an Australian modernist painter, and printmaker, recognized as one of the leading figures in Australian abstraction. He pioneered transcendental abstraction, developing a personal symbolic visual language based on cosmic structures, geometric forms, and spiritual evolution. Kemp's work explored the relationship between humanity and the universe. Over a career spanning more than five decades, his paintings, prints, and monumental tapestries established him as a central figure in modern Australian art.

== Early life ==
Francis Roderick Kemp was born on 3 July 1908, in California Gully, Eaglehawk, Victoria. He was raised in a devout Methodist household with Cornish roots. After a mining accident and his father's death in 1920, the family moved to Melbourne.

Initially aspiring to a career in music, Kemp later turned to visual art. He enrolled at the National Gallery of Victoria Art School in 1929, later attending the Working Men's College for a period of commercial art training, before returning to focus on painting at the Gallery School between 1933 and 1935. Finding academic methods too restrictive, Kemp considered himself largely self-taught.

== Early career (1935–1945) ==
After narrowly missing the prestigious Travelling Scholarship in 1935, Kemp withdrew into private studio practice for a decade. During this period, he developed a structural and symbolic approach to composition, inspired by Paul Cézanne and philosophical mysticism.

His first solo exhibition at the Velasquez Gallery in Melbourne in 1945 marked his emergence. While public reaction was divided, critics like Alan McCulloch praised his vibrant, rhythmical forms, recognizing Kemp’s strong emotional response to contemporary experience.

== Postwar metaphysical paintings (1945–1955) ==
Kemp’s postwar work explored existential and spiritual struggles. Paintings such as Force (1950–54) depicted crowded, dynamic forms locked in cosmic conflict. During this time, he adopted industrial enamel paints to achieve greater intensity.

== Transition to transcendental abstraction (1955–1968) ==
In the late 1950s, Kemp evolved a formal symbolic system using crosses, circles, and squares to express spiritual states and cosmic order. Major works from this period, such as Subjective Objectivity and Evolutionary Force, showed humanity’s integration into larger universal patterns.

In 1965, Kemp won the Georges Invitation Art Prize and the Transfield Art Prize. He later twice received the Blake Prize for Religious Art, in 1968 and 1970.

== Large-scale works and international engagement (1968–1978) ==
Traveling through Greece, Italy, and France, Kemp deepened his connection to architectural symbolism.

During his time at London's S.P.A.C.E. studios (1970–1972), he created expansive murals, including Rhythmical Sequence (1971), demonstrating a more open, breathing structure.

Though briefly exposed to New York abstraction, Kemp remained philosophically distinct, committed to a metaphysical rather than formalist abstraction.

== Late career and tapestries (1978–1987) ==
In 1978, Kemp collaborated with the Victorian Tapestry Workshop on monumental tapestries commissioned with the support of Dame Elisabeth Murdoch. These works, permanently installed in the Great Hall of the National Gallery of Victoria, form a major part of his legacy.

His retrospective Cycles and Directions 1935–1975 further solidified his stature. Following a stroke in 1980, Kemp adapted his practice to freer, more gestural modes until his death in 1987.

== Style and themes ==
Kemp’s work is characterized by transcendental abstraction, exploring:

- Cosmic unity and humanity’s spiritual ascent
- Symbolic geometry (circle for spirit, square for matter)
- Rhythmic dynamism suggesting evolutionary movement

James Gleeson praised Kemp’s work for its ritualistic quality: "Every moment, every gesture, every brushstroke becomes part of a ritual."

Kemp’s major philosophical influences included cosmology.

== Reception and influence ==
Initially marginalized during the 1940s, Kemp's stature grew steadily. Patrick McCaughey described his late career as "one of the great sustained creative flowerings in Australian art."

Internationally, his exhibitions in London and critical commentary in the United States and Europe noted his alignment with transcendental abstraction movements.

== Awards and recognition ==
- Helena Rubinstein Scholarship (1960)
- McCaughey Prize (1961)
- Georges Invitation Art Prize (1965)
- Transfield Art Prize (1965)
- Blake Prize for Religious Art (1968, 1970)
- Officer of the Order of the British Empire (OBE) (1978)
- Officer of the Order of Australia (AO) (1987)

== Personal life ==
In 1943, Kemp married Edna Merle McCrohan, an art teacher. They had four daughters, including playwright Jenny Kemp.

== Legacy ==
Kemp’s paintings, prints, and tapestries are held in:

- National Gallery of Victoria
- National Gallery of Australia
- Art Gallery of New South Wales
- Art Gallery of Western Australia

His tapestries at the NGV remain among the most recognizable public artworks in Melbourne. A major retrospective, Roger Kemp: Visionary Modernist, was staged at the Ian Potter Centre, NGV Australia, in 2019.

== Bibliography ==
- Christopher Heathcote, The Quest for Enlightenment: The Art of Roger Kemp, Macmillan Art Publishing, Melbourne, 2007, ISBN 9781876832438.
- David Hurlston, Roger Kemp: Visionary Modernist, National Gallery of Victoria, Melbourne, 2024, ISBN 9781925432695.
