= Rudy Komon =

Sydney based Australian art dealer, patron, gallerist and cellarmaster

Rudolph John Komon MBE (21 June 1908 – 27 October 1982) was a Viennese–born Czech–Australian art dealer, gallery director, benefactor and wine connoisseur. He had a great influence on the burgeoning artistic life of Australia in the 1950s and 1960s.

== Life ==
Komon was born in Vienna in 1908, to Czech parents, and his family later moved to Berlin. After school he was a journalist for a Czech language newspaper, and in 1938 he moved to Czechoslovakia itself and joined the resistance, while ostensibly engaged in journalism and art dealership. His parents remained in Berlin, and his mother was killed by Allied bombing during World War II. After the Communist takeover of his country in 1948 he escaped to Switzerland, then migrated to Australia in 1950, settling in Sydney.

He opened an antique store in Waverley, then the Rudy Komon Art Gallery in Paddington, in the site of a former liquor shop at 124 Jersey Road. The corner shop was modified into a gallery by local architect Neville Gruzman in 1963. Komon introduced European marketing practices to Australia, such as paying artists a wage in return for the right to sell their work, and significantly assisted the budding careers of painters such as Arthur Boyd, John Brack, Judy Cassab, Robert Dickerson, William Dobell, Russell Drysdale, Leonard French, Sidney Nolan, Clifton Pugh, Jon Molvig, John Olsen, Fred Williams and Brett Whiteley.

Gwen Frolich joined the gallery in 1961 as Komon's business partner until his death in 1982. The Gallery was then run by Frolich until it was closed in 1984.

== Honours ==
Komon was appointed a Member of the Order of the British Empire (MBE), Member (Civil) for the Arts on 2 June 1973.

He was also known as a bon vivant and connoisseur of wine. From 1956 to 1976 he was Cellarmaster of the Wine and Food Society of New South Wales, and from 1959 to 1979 he judged wine at shows in Sydney, Brisbane, Perth and Canberra. The Rudy Komon Memorial Perpetual Trophy is awarded annually at the Sydney Royal Wine Show.

Eric Smith's portrait of Rudy Komon won the 1981 Archibald Prize. Smith had previously entered a portrait of Rudy in the 1973 Archibald Prize. In 1970 Smith had won the Archibald Prize for a portrait of Komon's gallery architect Neville Gruzman.

A plaque commemorating Rudy Komon's life was installed at the site of his art gallery at 124 Jersey Road, Paddington by Woollahra Municipal Council.

== See also ==
- Archibald Prize
- Paddington
- Art Gallery of New South Wales
