= Sydney Ball =

Australian painter, etcher, and teacher (1933–2017)

- Born: 29 October 1933; Adelaide, South Australia
- Died: 5 March 2017 (aged 83); Sydney, New South Wales, Australia
- Movement: Abstract expressionism
- Website: sydneyballart.com

Sydney Ball (29 October 1933 – 5 March 2017) was an Australian abstract painter. He has been called ‘one of Australia’s leading colour abstract painters. He has also been credited with bringing large scale abstract expressionist paintings, or Color Field paintings, to Australia.

== Biography ==
Sydney Ball was born in 1933 in Adelaide, South Australia. In 1962, Ball moved to New York and enrolled at the Art Students League of New York, where he studied under Theodoros Stamos. During this period Ball met and was influenced by many of "The Irascible 18", including Mark Rothko, Jackson Pollock and Willem de Kooning. Ball's first solo show was in 1965 at the Westerly Gallery.

Ball returned to Australia in 1965 helping to bring abstract techniques to the attention of Australian artists. He lived and worked in Glenorie, New South Wales in his later years. Abstract expressionism was taken up enthusiastically by many Sydney painters in the 1960s. His contemporaries such as John Olsen, Erica McGilghrist and Leonard Hessing and the older Sam Atyeo were equally abstract but influenced by Dutch post-war avant garde and earlier Russian abstract painting, whereas Ball, similar to Yvonne Audette and John Vickery, was one of the first Australian artists of his generation to take an interest in American art over European art.

In his later years, Ball was well regarded in Australian art circles and one of his large scale works was a major acquisition at the Art Gallery of New South Wales.

== Painting series and exhibitions ==
=== Band series ===
The Band series were Ball's first abstract paintings. Consisting of vertical colour bands, the works were exhibited at the Westerly Gallery in New York in 1964.

=== Modular series ===
Ball worked on the Modular series between 1968 and 1969. The works are plywood constructions with high gloss enamel finishes. Ball used car spraying booths to get this effect. Black Reveal, a work from the series, is in the collection of the Art Gallery of New South Wales, examining the negative space of colour.

=== Stain series ===
Ball moved on from purely hard-edged abstraction after a return to New York between 1969 and 1971. The stain paintings, like Apache sound, 1972 in the collection of the Art Gallery of New South Wales, emphasized motion in the application of the paint. The series consists of approximately 100 works created by the artist during the 1970s. The Stain series impacted the possibilities for abstract art in Australia.

=== Exhibitions ===
Ball's work has been the subject of over 50 solo exhibitions and over 50 group exhibitions in Australia and the United States of America. In 1968 Ball's work was included in the influential exhibition The Field at the National Gallery of Victoria, demonstrating the arrival of hard edged abstraction in Australian art. His work has also been featured in the many exhibitions that have revisited the impacts of that exhibition on Australian art, such as Birth of the cool at the Samstag Museum, Adelaide.

=== Collections ===
Ball's work is in the collections of most major public galleries in Australia, including ten works in the National Gallery of Australia. Internationally, Ball has work in the Museum of Modern Art, New York and the National Museum of Contemporary Art in Seoul, South Korea.

In 2014, Ball donated 30 of his works, valued at one million dollars, to the University of South Australia.
