= Patrick McCaughey =

Australian art historian (born 1942)

Patrick McCaughey (born 1942) is an Irish-born Australian art historian and academic.

McCaughey was born in Belfast, his father being Davis McCaughey. He migrated with his family to Melbourne, Australia. when he was ten years old. His secondary education was at Scotch College, Melbourne. He resided at Ormond College, University of Melbourne, where he studied Fine Arts and English Literature. He became art critic for The Age newspaper in Melbourne in 1966. He was well known for his advocacy of abstract expressionism and of Australian artists, in particular Fred Williams.

On return to Australia from a year-long Harkness Fellowship in New York, he was appointed as the first professor of fine arts at Monash University in 1972 and the Monash Department of Visual Arts had its first intake in 1975. From 1981 he was the director of the National Gallery of Victoria.

In 1988 he left Australia for the United States, where he held positions including director of the Wadsworth Atheneum (1988–96), the chair in Australian Studies at Harvard University, and the director of the Yale Center for British Art.

McCaughey was married to Winsome McCaughey. He retired to Connecticut with his partner, Donna Curran. He continues to write, while she runs a restaurant.

== Bibliography ==
- The Pyramid in the Waste: The Search for Meaning in Australian Art 1983
- Fred Williams 1927-1982, Murdoch Books, 1987, 1996, 2008
- The Bright Shapes and the True Names: A Memoir, Text Publishing, 2003
- Bert and Ned : The Correspondence of Albert Tucker and Sidney Nolan Albert Tucker, Melbourne University Publishing, 2006
- Voyage and Landfall: The Art of Jan Senbergs, 2006
- Strange Country: Why Australian Painting Matters, Melbourne University Publishing, 2014
- The Diaries of Fred Williams 1963-1970, Miegunyah Press, 2024

=== Selected articles ===
- Patrick McCaughey (June 2011). "Native grounds and foreign fields : the paradoxical neglect of Australian art abroad". Australian Book Review. 332: 11–13.
