= David Larwill =

Australian artist

- Portrait of David Larwill by photographer Michel Lawrence
- Born: David Scott Larwill; 26 June 1956; Ballarat, Victoria, Australia
- Died: 19 June 2011 (aged 54); Coober Pedy, South Australia, Australia

David Larwill (1956–2011) was an Australian artist recognisable by his distinctive and exuberant style based on bold colour, stylised figures and simplified form. Although best known as a figurative expressionist painter, Larwill was also a draughtsman and printmaker of note. He produced many drawings, watercolours, ceramics and sculptures as well as etchings, lithographs and screenprints. In a career that stretched over 30 years, Larwill held over 25 solo exhibitions and participated in scores of group shows.

== Biography ==
=== Early life ===
David Larwill was born in the Victorian city of Ballarat and spent his early life on family-owned farms. In the 1960s, Larwill moved to his grandmother's house at Mt Martha, on Victoria's Mornington Peninsula. He attended Mornington High School (finishing in 1973) and later Frankston Technical College (1974–75), where he studied photography, painting and sculpture. The following year, Larwill started studying ceramics at Prahran College of Advanced Education but dropped out of the course after three months, and worked as a labourer at a steel mill in nearby Hastings. He then moved to Noosa in Queensland, to live in a girlfriend's parents' villa, and left Australia to travel throughout Europe and North America for 18 months.

Larwill returned to Melbourne in 1979 and moved into a St Kilda flat with art students Peter Ferguson and Wayne Eager. He enrolled at Preston Institute of Technology, where he studied for a year under Peter Booth, Peter D. Cole, Rod Bishop, Dale Hickey, Mirka Mora and John Dunkley-Smith. Larwill met fellow student Karan Hayman at this time, and they, along with many others, established Roar Studios in 1981. The Department Head, Betty Churcher (later Director of the National Gallery of Australia), advised him: "You don't need to come here ... Why don't you stay in your studio and paint and exhibit?" Larwill followed her advice.

The contemporary Australian painter, Peter Booth, had a profound impact upon the development of Larwill's early painting style. Larwill attended a 1979 exhibition of Booth's work at Pinacotheca Gallery, Richmond, Victoria, which consisted of large narrative paintings depicting the end of the world. Larwill was intrigued by what could be achieved through paint, commenting: "You could do ugly scenes but the overall effect is one of beauty".

Internationally, the work of French artist Jean Dubuffet and the CoBrA group were also important influences on Larwill's art; in particular, its revival of expressionism and interest in Outsider art. Larwill also admired the New York street art of Jean-Michel Basquiat, and had a growing appreciation of Aboriginal art from first-hand contact and personal friendships, most notably with the celebrated Australian painter Ginger Riley Munduwalawala.

==== Roar Studios ====
Disillusionment with art school experiences and the difficulties of breaking into the commercial gallery scene led to the establishment of Roar Studios, Brunswick Street, Fitzroy in 1982. The group aimed to counteract perceived biases in the local art community against women, young people and ethnic minorities. David Larwill's affable larrikinism and his powerful style attracted young emerging Melbourne artists who shared a similar desire to show their work. The core original founding group of the ROAR Studio collective included Larwill, Sarah Faulkner, Mark Howson, Karan Hayman, Mark Schaller, Ann Howie, Daniel Kogan, Peter Ferguson, Wayne Eager, Pasquale Giardino, Richard Birmingham, Michael Nicholls, Stephen McCarthy, Maggie MacNamara, Andrew Ferguson, Russell Cook, Glenda Wisemen, Julie Rosewarne and more. ROAR opening nights became well known for their salubrious atmosphere and late nights. The style of the ROAR artists was eclectic and they openly acknowledged their debt to a previous generation of Melbourne figurative expressionist painters including John Perceval, Danila Vassilieff and early Sidney Nolan.

ROAR Studios Opening Exhibition premiered in June 1982. Larwill showed two paintings. A successful solo exhibition held there the following year. While he continued to exhibit with ROAR, Larwill soon attracted the interest and attention of a number of well-known commercial dealers and galleries. In his comment on ROAR's ten-year anniversary exhibition, critic Robert Rooney commented that: "ROAR grew out of an impatience with rather than complete opposition to the existing commercial gallery system, a system into which early ROAR recruits would eventually be absorbed".

=== The middle years ===
In 1983 Larwill was invited to show with the United Artists Gallery, St Kilda. This gallery included respected mid-career artists such as Mike Brown, Asher Bilu and Dale Hickey. A second Larwill painting Ash Wednesday, 1983, was purchased by the National Gallery of Victoria.

Over the rest of the decade Larwill's work was increasingly shown in important group and prize exhibitions throughout Australia. This included: Vox Pop: Into the Eighties (National Gallery of Victoria, 1984), The Hugh Williamson Prize (Ballarat Fine Art Gallery, 1986) and A new generation 1983–88: Philip Morris Arts Grant Purchases (National Gallery of Australia, Canberra, 1988).

Larwill had extended stays in Central Australia (1990 and 1991) where he spent time working with local artists and conducting workshops. During his first trip to New York in 1992 the tags and graffiti he found in subways and on the streets became an important influence. He also saw the major retrospective exhibition of the American artist Jean-Michel Basquiat at New York's Whitney Museum of American Art. Larwill's artist-friend David Thomas remarked: ‘Larwill was much influenced by his skeletal images, use of tribal figures, surface writing and his ability to fill his canvas from edge to edge’. Larwill also reacquainted himself with Pablo Picasso's African-inspired masks and sculptures. Soon after, Larwill produced the first of many sculptures using found objects and the technique of assemblage.

Direct contact with isolated Aboriginal communities increased Larwill's appreciation of Indigenous art and culture. He responded directly to the beauty of the landscape by making many studies on paper. The time away also gave Larwill a more considered perspective on environmental and political issues. In 1984, Larwill responded to the threat of nuclear war by creating an anti-war piece, Nuclear Disarmament Party.

In 1986, Larwill was one of a number of Melbourne artists commissioned to paint a Melbourne W-class tram as part of the commemoration of the United Nations International Year of Peace. Larwill chose to paint images of war stridently outlined in black. His opposition to the unjust treatment of the first Australians led to the inclusion of works in pro-Aboriginal land rights exhibitions. Following an invitation to travel to Kakadu National Park and see its world-famous rock art sites in 1998, Larwill also participated in Stop Jabiluka Mine with Mark Schaller and Peter Walsh. The exhibition was held at Gould Galleries, Melbourne, in June 1998, as a protest against the proposed uranium mine that was planned for the wilderness area and park. In 2003 Larwill, Karan Hayman, Peter Walsh, Greg Ades, Tanya Hoddinott and Mark Schaller all travelled to Woomera and visited the proposed nuclear waste dump sites with indigenous leaders and then held exhibition of works ' Secret Country ' from the trip again at Gould Galleries to raise funds to support the cause.

‘David was always interested in the cause. He felt a responsibility to the wider world and had an interest in current affairs. He was a founding member of the Artists for Kids Culture Trust, raising money for underprivileged kids. David was also an early supporter of the Clean Ocean Foundation through its Hang 12 surfboard art exhibition and auction.'

=== Later years ===
In 1993 David Larwill settled once again on the Mornington Peninsula where he eventually set up a permanent home and studio. Dividing his time between Somers and Melbourne, Larwill began to make whimsical sculptures again, fashioned from weather-beaten found objects washed up from Western Port and Port Phillip Bay. At the same time, his paintings became larger and more ambitious in scale.

A 1994 solo exhibition of new works, "Snakes and Ladders", at Gould Galleries, Melbourne, was an artistic and commercial success, with the works nearly selling out in the first few days. With the aid of new manager, Ken McGregor, that was the beginning of a very successful phase of Larwill's art career that included the launch of a monograph on his work in 1999. For the first time, Larwill had a purpose-built art studio, the means to paint full-time, and a steady request for new works.

Larwill's appearance in national exhibitions and prizes continued to grow, including Streetwise, New York (1993), and as a finalist in the Art Gallery of New South Wales's Sulman Prize competition in 1994. In 2002, the solo survey exhibition, "David Larwill: Stuff that Matters", was presented at Ballarat Fine Art Gallery (now the Art Gallery of Ballarat) and subsequently toured to six venues across Australia. In 2003, Larwill's paintings were included in the exhibition "William Creek and Beyond". This exhibition was also toured nationally by the Art Gallery of Ballarat.

Throughout the 1990s and 2000s, David Larwill's international reputation was enhanced by new commissions, exhibitions and awards. The Victorian Government and the Victorian Art Centre Trust commissioned the large tapestry Celebration as a gift to Singapore’s new Esplanade Art Centre. The work toured regional Victoria before being installed at Esplanade in mid-2002. In 2010, a selection of Larwill’s recent paintings was also shown in Singapore when he and friend Mark Schaller were invited to participate in a joint exhibition "Art is Long".

Other notable international exhibitions included "David Larwill: Recent Paintings" (England & Co, London, 2003), and "David Larwill and the Western Desert Artists", organised by supporter Lisa Fox and held in Stephan Weiss Studio, New York, in 2008. That important exhibition was sponsored by Qantas airlines as part of the official Australian contribution to "Gooday USA".

A posthumous survey of David Larwill's final decade of work was held at the Mornington Peninsula Regional Gallery in 2013. This exhibition, entitled "Ten years on", revealed the breadth and considered nature of Larwill's mature oeuvre, and showed a diverse range of works that included paintings and drawings. Two bronze sculptures – Bird (2011), and Contemplating his place in humanity (2011) – were also included. They figured amongst Larwill's last works, because he was determined to finish them prior to his death.

Suffering from cancer, David Larwill died en route to Alice Springs in 2011. He had requested his friend and manager Ken McGregor to drive him there one last time. Larwill is survived by his wife, Fiona, and their sons, James and Henry.

== Art: subject and technique ==
David Larwill's early work was direct, spontaneous and often raw. A painting such as Luna Park, 1979, shows how he impulsively explored the dramatic, all-over quality of blacks and reds, combined with expressive handling of paint. The work refers to a well-known fun park in inner-city St Kilda that had attracted figurative artists that Larwill greatly admired.

Larwill compared the characteristic primitivism of his figures to letter writing: ‘It’s my symbols, my language. I want to show arrangements people have never seen before.’ In the paintings influenced by his time spent in New York, Larwill extended this lexicon to include canvases in which words shout from canvases full of noise; and there is a new tension within the compositions, which in Streetwise, New York, 1993 takes on the semblance of graffiti-covered walls.

For Larwill, painting was essentially a leap of faith. He began by putting paint on canvas and gradually the marks evolved and crystallised through the recall of everyday events. His subjects, although coming from the imagination, were ultimately taken from life; his family, pets, surroundings and things that he liked to do, read, listen to or see. These simple pleasures along with what was happening on the world stage both inspired and challenged him and became the basis of his art.

Shipwrecked, 1999, is a mature example of Larwill's intuitive approach to making art. Larwill was a keen sailor who appreciated the shape, feel and texture of timber-hulled boats. A voracious reader of the stories of seafarers and pirates, elements of the local environment and coastal folklore became important components of his work. The arrangement of the figures, boat, shields, marks and dots animate the painting. With its strong primitivist inclinations and clear stylistic references to Indigenous art, Shipwrecked combines the style of painting and sculpture Larwill developed subsequent to his time in New York. The palette of predominantly ochre, red and browns laid down over a bed of white and creams was a combination that features in a number of Larwill's large works from the late 1990s and early 2000s.

In the early 2000s Larwill turned from using oil to acrylic paint. Although he loved the smell of turpentine mixed with oil, he became frustrated with the time it took for oil paint to dry. He also loved the rich and dense colour available in acrylic paints and as it improved in quality he came to prefer this over the more traditional oil. ‘He worked in layers; layer upon layer and each session the work would evolve in structure. His work had a cyclical and rhythmic structure. ... He went to the studio to paint and took the history of painting, sketching out, reworking, glazing and looking with him. He spent a lot of time looking. His method was that of a traditional painter, the invention was in the work’.

What were you thinking?, 2006, is a characteristic late work that was one of the artist's favourites. It is a multi-faceted painting that combines a sophisticated layering of paint and the use of vibrant colours. The question posed by the painting could "refer to friends who have passed away or people who have done stupid things and lived to regret it ... David was ever-present in his paintings. He observed human nature and used his observations as a source for his work ..."

Contemplating his place in humanity and Bird are bronze sculptures that were exhibited in a 2011 exhibition designed to commemorate the original ROAR exhibition and artists. Ideas often had a long gestation period in Larwill's practice and he began working on concepts for these sculptures in 2005. Wax and clay moulds later became the basis for the dog and the bird. ‘David made the observation that “I feel as if I am doing something I have always done ... (my) hands are working”. He really enjoyed making these sculptures. He felt the dog was evocative. David had been diagnosed with cancer at this stage.’

== Collections ==
- The British Museum, London
- Esplanade Art Centre, Singapore
- National Gallery of Australia, Canberra
- National Gallery of Victoria, Melbourne
- Queensland Art Gallery, Brisbane
- Museum of Contemporary Art, Sydney
- Heide Museum of Modern Art, Melbourne Artbank
- Australian Football League, Melbourne
- New Parliament House, Canberra
- BHP Collection
- Sir William Dobell Foundation, Sydney
- Holmes à Court Gallery, Western Australia
- Shepparton Art Gallery, Victoria
- Deakin University Collection, Geelong, Victoria
- Art Gallery of Ballarat, Victoria
- Newcastle Art Gallery, New South Wales
- Gold Coast City Art Gallery, Queensland
- Artspace Mackay, Queensland
- Castlemaine Art Museum, Victoria
- Toowoomba Regional Art Gallery, Queensland
- Lismore Regional Gallery, New South Wales
- Benalla Art Gallery, Victoria

== Awards and commissions ==
- 'The Larwill Studio', Art Series Hotel Group, Parkville accommodation, linked to Royal Children's Hospital, opened 2014
- Celebration, tapestry commissioned by Victorian Government and Victorian Arts Centre Trust as a gift for Singapore's new Art Centre, 2002
- Things that matter, a republican theme painting to launch the Republican Countdown, 1999 Painting for Australian Football League Hall of Fame, Melbourne, 1996
- Cover design for Six pièces du théâtre contemporain australien, Editions Lansman, Belgium, 1995
- Lithograph design for the program, Rigoletto, The Australian Opera, 1989 Design for artists and industry, 1988
- National Gallery of Australia, restaurant commission, 1986
- Canvas-mural Philip Morris Arts Grant, National Gallery of Victoria, 1986 Poster and set design for Ubu Roi, Australian National University, 1986 Painted tram, Victorian Ministry of the Arts, 1986
- Mural for Australian Centre of Contemporary Art, South Yarra, 1984

== Selected bibliography and references ==
- David Larwill: Ten years on, Mornington Peninsula Regional Gallery, 2013 (Introductory essay by Ken McGregor; Fiona Larwill, Wayne Eager and Marina Strocchi in conversation with exhibition curator Rodney James)
- Roar Reviewed, Macmillan Art Publishing, Melbourne, 2011 (David Deague and Crenia Cadden)
- Art is Long: Mark Schaller and David Larwill, Aratong Galleries in conjunction with the Australian High Commission, Singapore, 2010 (Forewords by Ashley Crawford and Ken McGregor)
- David Larwill and the Western Desert Artists, Lisa Fox, New York, 2008 (Introduction by Sasha Grishin)
- Ken McGregor, William Creek & Beyond: Australian artists explore the outback, Craftsman House, Sydney, 2002
- David Larwill: Stuff that Matters, Ballarat Fine Art Gallery, 2002 (Preface by John Olsen and essays by David Thomas, Christopher Heathcote, Sian Prior and Zelda Cawthorne; Biography by David Thomas)
- Ashley Crawford, ‘David Larwill: The goblin force’, Art & Australia, vol.38, no.2, 2000, pp. 266–73
- Ken McGregor, with Elizabeth Thompson, David Larwill, Craftsman House, G+B Arts International, Sydney, 1997
- Traudi Allen, ROAR and quieter moments from a group of Melbourne artists, Craftsman House, G+B Arts International, Sydney, 1995
- Christopher Heathcote, ‘The roaring eighties’, Art Monthly, no.52, August 1992, pp. 15–16
- Robert Lindsay, Vox pop: Into the Eighties, National Gallery of Victoria, Melbourne, 1983
