= Trefor Prest =

Welsh-Australian sculptor (born 1945)

Trefor Prest (26 June 1945, Cardiff, UK) is a Welsh-born Australian sculptor living in Victoria since 1961. He produces highly-finished intricate and puzzling, often humorous, quasi-mechanical or machine-age constructions that are the subject of solo shows in major public and commercial galleries and feature in national and international group exhibitions, including the Mildura Sculpture Triennials.

== Biography ==
Trefor Geraint Prest was born on 26 June 1945 in Cardiff to John and Olive Prest (nee Hamlin), a teacher, and spent his childhood in Barrow a major South Wales coal port , and was the sole sibling of younger sister Lynda. Memory of the town's extensive industrial landscapes and its machinery were to become an inspiration for Prest's sculpture. He studied at the Croydon College of Art in 1960, but was expelled from the course before migrating with his family to Australia on 2 May 1961 when he was sixteen on the S.S. Fairsky from Southampton under the Assisted Passage Migration Scheme.

He was conscripted into the Australian army, and while a student living in Lytton Street, Glenroy and completing a Diploma of Art (sculpture) at the National Gallery of Victoria Art School, he and Stephen Benwell were charged and fined $50 for pasting posters advertising the 1971 Vietnam Moratorium march on walls and front windows of the new Gallery building. Three female accomplices were not fined and Lenton Parr, principal of the National Gallery Art School, was reported as saying; "there was no damage to the building, so the trustees were prepared to overlook the matter," and "the trustees believe it a pity the matter had not been referred to me originally."

Prest completed his diploma in 1973; a single arts subject, Modern European History, at La Trobe University, Melbourne; and welding and structural drawing, at the RMIT during 1972-74; and undertook graduate studies at the National Gallery of Victoria Art School during 1974-75. He started exhibiting in 1971.

While studying, Prest visited the Cape Schanck area to enjoy diving and solitude, and in the early 1970s purchased a building block there for $500 on which he practised his welding in constructing a small underground building with second-hand materials that he brought from Melbourne on his motor-bike. After the 1980s it fell into disrepair and he sold the block. During 1974 Prest travelled and studied in the UK and Europe and again in 1976, visiting the UK, Europe, Middle East, and Asia.

In 1982 Prest, his wife Belinda, an artist and dance and yoga teacher whom he met at the Gallery School, and their family of three, moved from a hilly rural block Kalorama in the Dandenongs to Sandon in Central Victoria. He was employed at Barkla Engineering in Newstead making truck trays, and has for 30 years been an active volunteer in the Country Fire Authority Newstead brigade. After six months in Sandon he moved to renovate and expand an 1890 miner's cottage on 12Ha in Strangways and to concentrate on his sculpture and family.

Prest lectured in Sculpture at the University of Ballarat from 1995-1996.

== Style and reception ==
Trefor Prest (1997) Desire (detail), Federation University Art Collection

Prest's work, produced using engineering techniques including forging, turning, riveting, pressing and welding with some woodworking and sewing, and made from scrap iron, brass and copper with some wooden and canvas elements, is mechanical in appearance and structure, though it is based on the human form. His early experiences of the Welsh docks provided inspiration for the machine-like, and sometimes operable, structures he makes. Critic Sasha Grishin responds to the humour in Prest works like Dogger Bank. His work has been described as "mechanically perfect but functionally absurd machines," while Robert Rooney asserts that;

Nothing could be more eccentric than the "sculptures" of Trefor Prest. These structures which look like ancient dental equipment or some other type of torture machine seem to have no reason except to satisfy the sculptor's desire to construct a well-engineered, but useless, contraption.

In 1978, critic John Davies, in reviewing the Seventh Mildura Sculpture Triennial judged "Trefor Prest's Surreal, machine-like Tales from the valley below, exhibited in the Bakery…one of the finest pieces in the Triennial."

In reviewing Prest's 1990 solo show at Pinacotheca gallery in The Age Peter Hill wrote that;

Parts of each work in turn remind the spectator of submarines, sextants, trawlers, farm machinery, pendulums, and 19th Century scientific instruments. They all look purposeful but are in fact functionless, and for that reason fit well with Lothar Romain's views of deconstruction. Romain was one of the selectors of the last Documenta and, as an antipost-modernist, described deconstruction as "a means of setting up a model with the help of construction elements such as ordinary everyday objects. In this model these construction elements are experienced to have no significance at all and have lost their original meaning." By extension, the use of everyday objects can embrace everyday manufacturing processes, fashioning a new artistic revolution from an old industrial revolution. Trefor Prest is one of the best artists in the world at this, along with a few others such as Donald Lipski. Both fashion very different art objects through very similar attitudes to three dimensional construction.

His design for an elaborate ceremonial mace was commissioned by Federation University, Ballarat, in 1995.

In 2014 director Paul Cox in filming his feature Force of Destiny (2015) based on Cox's experience with liver cancer and a liver transplant, used Prest's studio and work to portray the film's hero (David Wenham) as a sculptor.

At auction in 2003 at Christies, Prest's Taffrail Delights (1989) in wood, copper, tin, steel, stainless steel (152 x 65 x 42 cm) was purchased for AUD 4,465.00 beating an estimate of AUD 800 - AUD 1,200

== Exhibitions ==
=== Solo ===
- 1990: Trefor Prest, Melbourne Festival, Pinacotheca gallery, September–October
- 1990: Castlemaine Art Museum
- 1990: Trefor Prest, Melbourne Festival, Pinacotheca, September–October
- 1991: Australian Galleries, Sydney, Aug–Sep
- 1992: Pinacotheca
- 1994: Trefor Prest, sculpture, Australian Galleries, Paddington
- 1994: Pinacotheca
- 2010: Lake Bolac Eel Festival
- 2014: Fabricated Memories, La Trobe University Visual Arts Centre, Bendigo, 26 March to 27 April

=== Group ===
- 1972: Sculpture: Pat Brooks, Vlase Nikoleski, Trevor Prest, Ewing Gallery, University of Melbourne, 26 June 1972 – 7 July
- 1975: Nine artists : 1975 graduate exhibition, School of Art, the Victorian College of the Arts, Melbourne
- 1975: Sixth Mildura Sculpture Triennial
- 1975: Artists' Artists, with Reg Parker, David Wilson, National Gallery of Victoria, Melbourne, September – October
- 1978: Seventh Mildura Sculpture Triennial
- 1980: Some contemporary Australian sculpture, Newcastle Art Gallery, 15 May - 15 June
- 1980: Fifteen Sculptors, National Gallery of Victoria
- 1980: Fifteen Sculptors, Benalla Art Gallery
- 1981: Australian Sculpture Triennial
- 1981: Melbourne artists, Watters Gallery, Sydney
- 1994: Sculpture '94, Castlemaine State Festival 1994
- 1985: Sculptors as Craftsmen, Meat Market Craft Centre, Melbourne
- 1988: with Simon Klose, Dale Hickey, Robert Rooney, Robert Hunter, Rosalie Gascoigne, David Wadelton, James Gleeson, and others, Pinacotheca, Melbourne, 29 June-13 August
- 1993: Dame Edna regrets she is unable to attend: Humour and satire in Australian contemporary sculpture, Nolan Gallery, Lanyon
- 1993: Excalibur: contemporary artists and Celtic Heritage, Geelong Art Gallery, March - 2 May
- 1999: Volume & Form: Singapore 1999, with Geoffrey Barlett; Peter Blizzard; Marcus Champ; Greg Clark; Peter D. Cole; Clifford Frith; Greg Johns; Inge King; Christopher Langton; Adrain Mauriks; Loretta Quinn; Ron Robertson-Swann; Giuseppe Romeo; Richard Stringer; Neil Taylor; Hossein Valamanesh; Fu Zhongwang; Liang Ming-Cheng; Li Ming; Shao Fan; Sui Jianguo; Wang Hongliang; Yu Fan; Zhan Wang; Zhang Yongjian; Zuo Zheng-Yao; Ha Bik-Chuen; Ho Siu Kee; Kwok Mang Ho; Danny Lee; Eddie Lui; Mok Yat San; Tong King-Sum; Van Lau; Wu Man-Wai; Latika Katt; Prithpal Singh Ladi; Prasantha Mukherjee; Pushpamala; Ravinder Reddy; Vivan Sundaram; Rajendar Tiku; Nindityo Adipurnomo; Anusapati; FX Harsono; Hedi Hariyanto; Mella Jaarsma; Yusra Martunus; Pintor Sirait; Gregorius Sidharta Soegiyo; S. Teddy D.; Shigeyo Kobayashi; Yoshiko Takikawa; Shigeo Toya; Kimio Tsuchiya; Choi Duck-Kyo; Choi Jeong Hwa; Choo Hyun-Jae; Huh Baik; Jeun Loi-Jin; Kim Chang-Gon; Kim Jung-Hoo; Oh Sang-Wook; Park Jung-Ae; Park Suk-Won; Yoo Li-zzy; Youn Young-ja; Yun Suk Nam; Ramlan Abdullah; Frederique Boumeester; Terry Law; Tengku Sabri Ibrahim; Sharmiza; Aung Myint; Rene Boutin; Chris Booth; Christopher Braddock; Derrick Cherrie; Charlotte Fisher; Jaccqueline Fraser; Christine Hellyar; Vicky Kerr; Virgina King; Judy Millar; Terry Stringer; Greer Twiss; Agnes Arellano; Gabriel Barredo; Reynato Paz Contreras; Ramon Orlina; Impy Pilapil; Paz Abad Santos; Luis Yee, Jr.; Reginald Yusson; Ayob Bin Ismail; Chong Fah Cheong; Han Sai Por; Lim Soo Ngee; Joseph McNally; Ng Eng Teng; Sun Yu Li; Victor Tan; Chang Tzu Lung; Long-Bin Chen; Dawn Chen Ping; Marvin Minto Fang; Michell Hwang; Lai Chi-Man; Jun Tsun-Tsun Lai; Lee Kuan Yu; Lee Tsai-Chien; Ju Ming; Cynthia Sah; Tsai Ken; Arthur Yang; Prof. Yuyu Yang; Montien Boonma; Kamol Phaosavasdi; Nitaya Ueareeworakul; Dao Chau Hai; Nguyen Quan; Phan Phuong Dong; Singapore Art Museum Sculpture Square, 21 May–28 June
- 2000: Inaugural exhibition QDOS Sculpture Park, with Adrian Mauriks, Jock Clutterbuck, Peter Blizzard, George Turcu, Fiona Orr, Christine Gibson, Shona Nunan, Michael Cartwright, Dan Wollmering, Graeme Wilkie, David Tucker, Bjorn Holm, Russel Petherbrige, Peter Schipperheyn, Anton Hassel, Eva Volny, Robert Delves, Gus Dall'Ava, Paul Blizzard, Jamieson Miller, opened by Dr. Edward Tweddell, Chairman of the Adelaide Arts Festival, 22 April, QDOS, Lorne.
- 2003: The 8th International Shoebox Sculpture Exhibition : a traveling exhibition organised by the University of Hawaiʻi Art Gallery
- 2014: Living Arts Space.with Rhyll Plant and Nena Perrill
- 2017: Momentum: Kinetic-Robotic-Mechanic, Backspace Gallery, Ballarat
- 2020: Arts Open, Castlemaine

== Awards ==
- 1977 Project grant, Visual Arts Board
- 1980; Standard individual grant for six months, Visual Arts Board

== Collections ==
- National Gallery of Australia
- Queen Victoria Museum and Art Gallery
- Artbank
- Newcastle Regional Art Gallery
- National Capital Development Commission, Canberra (now with National Archives)
- Launceston
- Federation University Art Collection

== Bibliography ==
- Prest, Trefor; Castlemaine Art Gallery and Historical Museum; Pinacotheca (Art gallery) (1988), Sculpture, Castlemaine Art Gallery
- Victorian College of the Arts. School of Art; Victorian College of the Arts. Gallery (1975), Nine artists : 1975 graduate exhibition, School of Art, the Victorian College of the Arts, Melbourne, Victorian College of the Arts
- Mildura Sculpture Triennial (6th : 1975); Mildura Arts Centre (1975), 6th Mildura Sculpture Exhibition : an opening feature for Arts Victoria 75, The Centre
- Carew, Ann; Geelong Art Gallery (1993), Excalibur : contemporary artists and Celtic heritage, Geelong Art Gallery, ISBN 978-1-875237-09-8
- Bak, Henk (January 1995). "Maritime sculptures". Craft Arts International (34): 84–86.
- Scarlett, Ken (1980), Australian sculptors, Nelson, p. 532, ISBN 978-0-17-005292-4
