= Irene Barberis =

Australian artist (born 1953)

- Born: 1953 (age 72–73); Chiswick, England
- Education: Preston Institute, BFA; Victorian College of the Arts, Post Graduate Diploma of Art; Victorian College of the Arts, MFA; Victoria University, PhD
- Occupation: Artist

Irene Barberis, is an Australian/British artist, based in Melbourne and London. She is a painter primarily, working also with installation, drawing, and new media art. She is also the founding director of an international arts research centre, and is an international curator and writer.

== Education ==
1996-2001 Doctor of Philosophy, Victoria University, Melbourne, Australia
1992-1994 Master of Fine Art, Victorian College of the Arts, Melbourne University, Australia
1979-1981 Keith and Elizabeth Murdoch Travelling Fellowship, (taken up in Paris, Cite des Arte)
1977-1978 Post Graduate Diploma, Victorian College of the Arts, Melbourne, National Gallery of Victoria
1975 Graduate Diploma of Art and Design (Painting), Phillip Institute of Technology, Melbourne, Australia
1972-1974 Prahran College of Advanced Education, (Painting), Melbourne, Australia

== Life ==
Barberis was born in Chiswick in London, in 1953. She grew up in rural Victoria and began studying classical ballet at the age of three, giving it up after an injury at the age of nineteen. Barberis became the partner of the Australian artist Robert Hunter between 1973 and 1977, travelling with him to New York, for his exhibition at the Museum of Modern Art, and then to Europe. Returning to Australia from this journey, aged 22, she completed her BFA at the Preston Institute with friends, peers and lecturers including Peter Booth, Dale Hickey, and Dominico De Clario. De Clario included her in her first group exhibition in 1976, Drawing Some Definitions at the George Paton Gallery, Melbourne University. She completed a Post Graduate Diploma of Art at the Victorian College of the Arts, VCA, in Melbourne. On receiving the 1979 Keith and Elizabeth Murdoch Fellowship from the VCA, Barberis travelled to Paris in late 1979 after receiving an Australia Council Grant and receiving the Australian Power Studio at the Cite des Arts, Paris. She lived, worked, and exhibited at the Cite des Arts from 1980, returning to Australia in late 1982. She married Australian sculptor Adrian L. Page in 1984 and in 1988 had their one child Rebekah Georgia Page. She completed an MFA at the Victorian College of the Arts, Melbourne University in 1994 and a PhD on Abstract and Figurative Elements of the Apocalypse and its Representations in 2000. She is a senior lecturer at the Royal Melbourne Institute of Technology (RMIT) School of Art and lectures in painting in the School of Art program in Hong Kong, at the Hong Kong Art School. She is the Founder and Director of the Global Centre for Drawing, Director of Metasenta Publications in Melbourne, Australia. and is Co Director of Gallery Langford120 (with Wilma Tabacco). Barberis has been the International Critic for the New York-based, 'Rome Art Program' for five years and is associated with the SACI Institute in Florence, Italy.

== Work ==
Barberis has been making art since the mid-1970s, and was a post graduate of the Victorian College of the Arts, winning the Keith and Elizabeth Murdoch Travelling Fellowship in 1979. She gradually adopted Biblical subject matter in her work. She has exhibited internationally since the 1980s. In 2005, she initiated and was part of the exhibition "Intersections: Reading the Space" at the Jewish Museum of Australia, which was exhibited in 2005 at the Contemporary Jewish Museum of San Francisco. Other exhibitions include "Trancentric," London, 2008, "The Agency of Words" Lethaby Gallery, London, Text Festival 2009, Bury Museum and Art Gallery, Manchester, UK, "Apocalypse; Seven Histories into Futures", Arc Biennial 2009, Brisbane, Australia, 'Lines of Thinking, Langford120 in 2011, and Apocalypse/Revelation: Re Looking, 2012. Her major project 'The Tapestry of Light" in collaboration with 4 international scholars, including Michelle P. Brown (University of London) and chemist David Mainwaring (Swinburne University of Technology) was completed in 2017. The Visual Arts Centre, La Trobe University, Bendigo hosted the latest exhibition which includes works made by the Australian Tapestry Workshop.

== The LeWitt Project ==
The LeWitt Project:Ten Countries, 2019, onwards. Barberis met Sol LeWitt in New York in 1974, and they remained friends till his passing in 2007. She has been a friend of the LeWitt family for over thirty years. Barberis was the first artist to make work in Sol LeWitt’s Chester Studio, apart from his daughter, the artist Eva LeWitt, spending more than seven and a half months over three residencies, researching and making work in his space on an average of ten hours a day, exploring the relationships and synergies in their work, and LeWitt’s studio processes, especially his gouaches.

In 2019 Barberis conceived the idea of The LeWitt Project, a long term research and exhibition program across ten countries, looking at the influence of Sol LeWitt and his ideas. Commencing at the University of Dundee in 2023, Barberis was made an Honorary Fellow to work on both The LeWitt Project, UK and her new nanoparticle tapestry work on LeWitt – followed by Melbourne, Australia at RMIT University 2024 -The LeWitt Project, Australia, and Hong Kong in 2024 – The LeWitt Project, Hong Kong/China.

In 2022, Barberis published a book on Sol LeWitt’s Chester studio. The photographic documentation explores LeWitt’s studio as he left it after his untimely death in 2007.

== The Tapestry of Light (1998-2018 ongoing) ==
Barberis’ The Tapestry of Light: A 21st Century Apocalypse; Intersections of Illumination is a research project of more than 20 years. Barberis completed her PhD on the Abstract and Figurative Elements of the Apocalypse and Its Representations for the millennial change in 2000. Out of this research came The Tapestry of Light artwork. One of its research aspects is to define the role of 'light' in a modern exploration of the classical iconography of the ‘Last Days.’ Framed by the key 14th-century artwork the ‘Angers Tapestry’, the research is located at the intersection of artistic design, science and perception of illumination and colour, medieval culture, and imagery. The resulting creative work in its exhibited form asks: Can new intersections of contemporary thought and scientific perception and the Apocalypse, open new domains of understanding through the immersive qualities of such an artwork?

The Tapestry of Light artwork is a 3.2 x 36 metre full cycle of the Apocalypse, constructed from traditional threads and cutting-edge nano particle phosphorescent science (developed by physical chemist David E. Mainwaring). It is a light-forming, responsive-tapestry in which the perception of the images evolves as the light environment changes. It was woven on a jacquard loom by the famous Flanders Tapestry. The Tapestry of Light has fourteen panels: eight 1mt x1.2mts, four panels of 4mts x 3.2 mts, and two panels of 6 mts x 3 .2mts. Situated above the images is the entire Book of Revelation text, which hovers 3 mts above the floor when exhibited in a darkened space. The central images of four of the large panels contain early paintings and drawings of the Apocalypse by Barberis. Two of the four metre panels contain 64 separate images in star formations, from the Angers Tapestry; the full cycle was re-drawn, and re-miniaturised in a 21st century setting, forming the first full Apocalypse cycle by a female artist in over 500 years. It gives new knowledge in its re-presentation of the Apocalypse to a 21st century audience, and in its art and science foci, expression, and knowledge transfers between medieval Europe to present technologies. Michelle. P. Brown (University of London) is the work’s international curator. Alain Arnold, Ordo Praedicatorum |Official (Santa Sabina, Rome) was the curator at St Gudula Cathedral, Brussels, and Amy Van Dyke, the curator at the Museum of the Bible, Washington DC.

In 2017, the artwork was first shown at St Michael and St Gudula Cathedrals (Brussels). It was then shown at Canterbury Cathedral, followed by Canterbury Festival (UK) with 14,500 visitors. In 2019-2020, It was shown at the Museum of the Bible (Washington DC, USA). In addition to extensive media coverage globally, the work has been the subject of numerous conference and journal publications.

== Metasenta ==
Barberis is the founding director of Metasenta an international arts research hub, supported by a number of universities including RMIT University in Melbourne and the University of the Arts, London. She has been director of its hubs and projects since this time. Her work with Metasenta has included initiating international art projects, exhibitions, publications and films. She founded and directed the mobile gallery, The DrawingSpace, Melbourne, an extension of her 2004 Public Arts Commission, A Kineaesthetic Experience: 10 Works which utilised dormant spaces around Frankston, Victoria. Metasenta is known for published and commissioned books. For example, Barberis, on behalf of Metasenta, commissioned a new survey of Australian drawing, Contemporary Australian Drawing #1.

Barberis curated the large international survey exhibition Across the Gulf; Bahrain Dubai and Abu Dhabi: 22 Artists for the 2009 Arc Biennial Brisbane. Barberis has also concentrated on major drawing exhibitions including in 2010 Contemporary Australian Drawing#1, 35 Artists, RMIT Gallery, and Contemporary Australian Drawing #2, 84 Artists, University of the Arts London, Gallery Langford 120, 2012. She was international xhair of the xonference "Crossing the Line: Drawing in the Middle East", which formed a dialogue through drawing at the beginning of the Arab Spring. Crossing the Line: Drawing in the Middle East2 Conference was held in Dubai in September 2014 in which Barberis was the initiator and international chair. Contemporary Australian Drawing #4 was held in September 2013 at the New York Studio School and included 94 Australian Artists. A number of Barberis' initiatives and philosophies on drawing through the university systems, Galleries and Drawing Centres is documented in the June Issue of the Australian Journal, Imprint, The Good Drawing, University of the Arts London, 2012 and "The Drawn Word; even if I write my name I am drawing", 2014.
