= Contemporary Greek art =

Greek art produced after World War II

Contemporary Greek art is defined as the art produced by Greek artists after World War II.

== Painting-Sculpture ==
=== Abstract Expressionism ===
Theodoros Stamos (1922-1997) was an acclaimed abstract expressionist artist from Lefkas, who lived and worked in New York in the 1940s and 50s. His work has been exhibited throughout the world, and can be found in major museum collections such as the Whitney Museum of Art, the Guggenheim Museum, Smithsonian and the National Gallery of Art in Washington, D.C.

Dimitris Koukos (1948-) is also considered as a leading expressionist painter, mainly renowned for his abstract work and landscapes. Koukos has had over 30 one man exhibitions and participated in several group exhibitions in Athens, Paris, Boston, and Moscow. The artist's works can be found in private collections in the U.S., France, Italy, U.K. as well as at the National Gallery in Athens, the Pieridis Museum, the Vorres Museum, the Cultural Institute of the National Bank of Greece, the Greek Ministry of Culture and the Ministry of Education in Cyprus.

=== Kinetic Art ===
Takis was born in 1925 in Athens, and is an internationally acclaimed self-taught sculptor. He travelled, worked exhibited in Athens, Paris, London, New York and in many other cities. He is particularly known for his telemagnetic sculpture that formed the basis of his aesthetic expression and his musical sculptures. Takis' musical sculptures are based on the simple concept of using magnetic waves caused by electricity as a means to activate repeated musical sounds: the latter are to be heard every time a needle strikes a string, when attracted by a magnet. He won the Grand Prize at the Paris New Biennale in 1985. An illustrative example would be the installation of a real forest of numerous Signs in the Place de la Defence in Paris (1984–87), the original and imaginative illumination of the Arc de Triomphe at the same period, the transformation of the aqueduct at Beauvais into a musical tower with a network of vertical metallic strings, in 1992, and his design for the layout of a subway station in Toulouse in 1993. Takis' non-morphological inquiries have continued through successive rejections of representationalism; his method and the acoustic sensations which it calls forth retain their austerity. These are the features which place his artistic inventions among the most important achievements of contemporary, post-World War II art.

=== Arte povera ===
In Arte povera, artists use any medium they could get for free or very, very cheap. The main Greek representative of arte povera is Jannis Kounellis, who introduced found objects in his paintings, such as live animals but also fire, earth, burlap sacks, gold. He replaced the canvas with bed frames, doorways, windows or simply the gallery itself.

=== Stuckism ===
Stuckism is an international artistic movement that was created as a reaction to conceptual art. Stuckist painter Odysseus Yakoumakis in September 2004, founded the first Greek group of Stuckism International named The Romantic Anonymous Fellowship to oppose to the provinciality of the mainstream contemporary Greek art and in particular post-modernism.

== Performance Art ==
Leda Papaconstantinou is known on the Greek art scene as a pioneer in the fields of performance art. After beginning her studies in Greece, she continued in England from 1967 to 1971 at the Loughton College of Art then at the Kent Institute of Art and Design. Her first performance films, shot in Super 8 in 1969, show a remarkable aptitude at combining bodily language and the language of experimental cinema and materials (Oh Godard – Celebrating Godard, Self Portrait, 1969). In her films, she and other artist collaborators (Sally Potter, Stuart Brisley, Marc Camille Chaimowicz) accomplish series of intensely dramatic actions in very intricate visual installations. Inspired by Antonin Artaud and Jean Genet’s theatre, to which she devoted two pieces, she uses the body to represent the coalition of antithetical elements, such as feminine/masculine, nature/art, memory/subconscious, eros/thanatos, historical time/present time.

Georgia Sagri is an artist and a founding organizer of the Occupy Wall Street movement. Georgia Sagri's social activism (alongside her artistic activities) dates back to 1997, when she was a member of the Void Network in Athens. Sagri has organized the perambulatory curatorial project Saloon and the audio-only magazine Forté since 2009. In 2013 she initiated the semi-public and semi-personal space [matter]HYLE in Athens, with the mission to develop a new model for the contemporary work-life structure. She has exhibited and participated in documenta 14 (2017), Manifesta 11 (2016), Istanbul Biennial (2015), La biennale de Lyon (2013), Whitney Biennial (2012), Thessaloniki Biennale (2011), and the Athens Biennale (2007).

Mary Zygouri addresses issues related to individual identity and social crisis in the contemporary world. In her work she invents and impersonates fictional characters in reality, false identities presented in public actions and video-performances with symbolic and paradoxical results. She focuses on the notion of self in relation to systems of power, censorship, and surveillance. Starting from historical events, investigating archives, biographies, and literary narratives, she alters the past and its many interpretations, by transferring, re-signifying, and representing them in contemporary frames of reference, relocating them in contemporary reality.

FYTA are a Greek performance-art duo who curate regular art events as well as producing their own artefacts. They participated in the 4th and 6th Athens Biennale and are described as "far from a fringe group in the Greek art world".

== Digital Art ==
Miltos Manetas is an artist who makes paintings, videoworks, prints and performances about video games, players and computer hardware.

Andreas Angelidakis is an architect and artist working at the intersection of digital culture and architectural production. He is one of the first artists who treated the internet as a real place, a site where he designed and built online communities such as the Chelsea Project and Neen World. He also designed and built spaces, intended to appear as computer renderings, sparking a discussion as to whether they were ever built (Pause pavilion, Stockholm 2002) and spaces that included a garden of mummified plants used as a virtual horizon for a laser beauty clinic (Forever Laser, Geneva 1998 and 2003). Angelidakis has realized projects in Sweden, Switzerland, United States and Italy for publications, museums and cultural foundations.

Lydia Venieri although known as painter and mixed media sculptor started doing internet art in 1994 with her showing of Fin at the FIAC95. This was followed by Her Story, Apology (addressed to the artist Takis). Her last digital work Moonlight was released in 2008 for the iPhone.

== See also ==
- Contemporary art
- Art in modern Greece
- Greek art
- National Gallery of Greece

== Bibliography ==
- Greek Horizons: Contemporary Art from Greece (1998) Efi Strousa, Roger Wollen, Tullie House Museum, Art Gallery Carlise, England
- Modern and Contemporary Art in Greece (1984) Hans-Jörg Heusser AICARC Center, Zürich
- In Present Tense: Young Greek Contemporary Artists (2007) The National Museum of Contemporary Art
