= Stuckism in Australia =

Overview of artistic movement in Australia

Captain Anthrax Vs Doctor Death in the arena of Tiki's by Regan Tamanui, the first Stuckist in Australia

Stuckism is an art movement that began in London, England, in 1999. In 2000, Melbourne artist Regan Tamanui started the first international branch of the movement. As of 2010, there are seven Australian Stuckist groups, who have held shows—sometimes concurrently with UK activities—received coverage in the Australian press and on TV, and also been represented in UK shows. The Stuckists take a strong pro-painting and anti-conceptual art stance, and were co-founded by Charles Thomson and Billy Childish.

== Chronology ==
In October 2000, Regan Tamanui founded the Melbourne Stuckists, the fourth Stuckist group to be started and the first one outside the UK (there are now 127 groups in 32 countries). On 27 October, he staged the Real Turner Prize Show at the Dead End Gallery in his home, concurrent with three shows with the same title in England (London, Falmouth and Dartington), and one in Germany, in protest against the Tate Gallery's Turner Prize.

Besides Tamanui, the other initial members were Justin Grub, Ben Blanchette, Malcome Mmackie and Dave Freeman Rose. A subsequent line-up was Basil Kouvelis, Justin Grubb, Ben Frost, Nigel Stein, Daniel Gorzadek, Stephen Sperling and Dennis Roper. Stein, an RMIT art student, was prompted to join the group after Karen Ward was given the inaugural $105,000 Helen Lempriere Award for her minimal sculpture The Hut, derided by him as a "Wendy House". Tamanui said, "There are some people who shit in a tin. Is that really art?"

In May 2001 Tamanui, Stein, Grubb and Kouvelis were represented with 24 international groups in the London show Vote Stuckist, so named because Thomson was standing as a candidate in the 2001 United Kingdom general election, as a Stuckist candidate against the then-Culture Secretary, Chris Smith.

In November the Melbourne Stuckists staged a show Houdini to Hofmann at the Chiara Goya Gallery, which included some UK Stuckist work for the first time.

Kaye Blum made a short documentary on the group, Art Gets Unstuck-Up. The film is structured around the artists reading lines from the Stuckists Manifesto written by Thomson and Childish. It was first shown at the Jaffas Down the Aisle film festival in Melbourne in October 2001, then in 2002 at the International Film Festival of Fine Art in Hungary and the Asolo Arts Film Festival in Italy, where it was nominated for best student short.

In 2001, Graham Wilson, born and bred in Gunnedah, New South Wales, founded the second Australian group (and the first Stuckist sculpture group), the Newcastle Stuckist Stonecarvers.

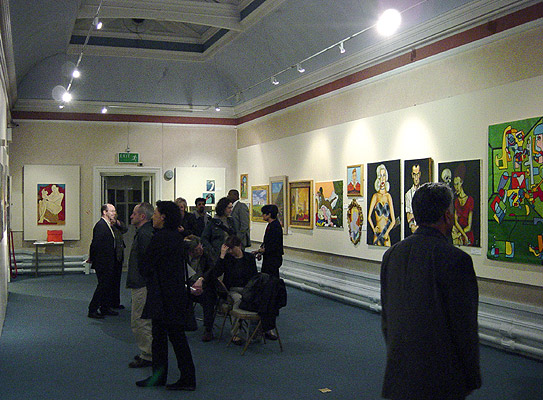
Tamanui's work (painting on right) in the Stuck in Wednesbury show.

In December 2001, The Stuckist demonstration outside the Turner Prize at Tate Britain, London, was broadcast on Australian national TV news.

In 2002, Godfrey Blow started the Perth Stuckists (Western Australia). In July, along with Melbourne Stuckists he was shown at The First Stuckist International, which opened in the Stuckism Gallery, Shoreditch, London.

In March 2003, Tamanui was exhibited in Stuck in Wednesbury, the Stuckists' first show in a public gallery, held in Wednesbury Museum and Art Gallery, England.

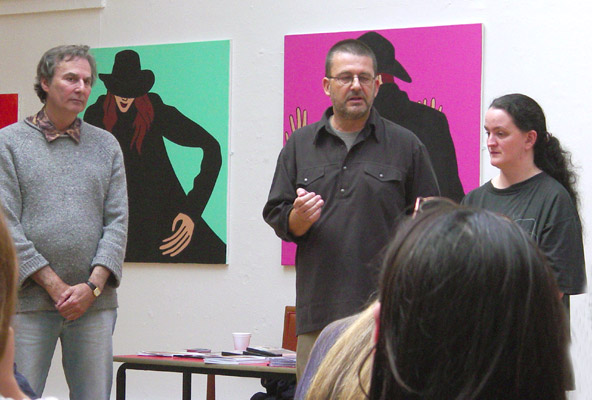
Left to right: Godfrey Blow, Odysseus Yakoumakis and Jacqueline Jones at The Triumph of Stuckism show and symposium, Liverpool Biennial 2006.

In October 2002, Tamanui opened the Stuckism International Centre (Australia) with an ongoing exhibition of work, as well as the first international Stuckist show in Australia, Stuck Down South, at the FAD Gallery. This included founding Stuckists, Charles Thomson, Ella Guru and Sexton Ming. (Like the London gallery it has now ceased operating.)

In September 2004, Blow exhibited in the movement's first major show in a national museum, The Stuckists Punk Victorian at the Walker Art Gallery during the Liverpool Biennial. He returned for the next Biennial there in 2006 to participate in The Triumph of Stuckism show and symposium at 68 Hope Street Gallery.

== Media coverage ==
The Australian presence was first noted in an article on the Stuckists in the UK Observer Sunday newspaper in May 2000.

The participation of the Australian Stuckists in the London Vote Stuckist show occasioned a double page spread by Gabriella Coslovich in the leading Melbourne paper The Age. It revealed a similar range of reactions to the ones the UK group had received in Britain. Melbourne painter David Larwill said, "It's the best thing I've heard in ages." Max Delaney, director of public gallery 200 Gertrude Street, accused the group of "revisionism" and "publicity and marketing". Su Baker, head of the School of Art, Victorian College of the Arts, wrote it off as "a cheap shot" (the same accusation which Sir Nicholas Serota had levelled at Thomson in London. In July Stein repeated the same debate on "Coast to Coast", Channel 2 (ABC TV).

Over the ocean by Godfrey Blow

In February 2003, Tracey Emin was interviewed in The Sydney Morning Herald while in Australia:

Of the chief YBA critics, the Stuckists, Emin cannot even speak.

"I don't like it at all," she spat. "I don't really want to talk about it. If your wife was stalked and hounded through the media by someone she'd had a relationship with when she was 18, would you like it? That's what happened to me. I don't find it funny, I find it a bit sick, and I find it very cruel, and I just wish people would get on with their own lives and let me get on with mine."

In August 2003, Australian performance artist Stelarc's plan to have a human ear grafted onto his forearm drew virulent criticism from UK Stuckists. Melbourne Stuckist, Nigel Stein, said, "Personally, I have been an admirer of Stelarc's work for about 10 years. I would be really interested in seeing the outcome."

The same month, Kouvelis and Thomson were interviewed on ABC Radio National Australia by Francis Leach. In June 2004 Childish (who left the group in 2002) was interviewed on ABC Radio National Australia.

In October 2004 an article, "Breaking New Ground", appeared in the Hills Gazette, Kalamunda, Western Australia, outlining Blow's involvement in the Stuckist movement and representation at the "Stuckist Punk Victorian" exhibition at the Walker Art Gallery in Liverpool.

In April 2005 The Age ran a reprise of Stuckism and observed:

"Stuckists have been dismissed by many as 'rebels without a cause', but their influence is, well, sticking ... The Stuckists have not beaten Saatchi, but he may be joining them."

In July 2005, State of the Arts Australian art magazine gave a survey on the UK and Australian Stuckists, and found:

Newcastle stone-carver Graham Wilson says he became a Stuckist because he was tired of being ignored by the main arbiters of taste and wanted to embrace the insult that he was not a real sculptor as did Childish when Emin declared he was "stuck".

In December 2005, the Stuckists demonstrated about the Tate Gallery's purchase of their trustee Chris Ofili's work, The Upper Room, wearing monkey and elephant masks, outside the Turner Prize at Tate Britain in London. A syndicated report covered the demonstration in The Sydney Morning Herald, The Age, Yahoo Australia, ABC News Online, SBS, Seven and The Australian. In June 2006 Blow supported the campaign with message board posts.

== Groups in Australia ==
- The Melbourne Stuckists founded in 2000 by Regan Tamanui
- The Newcastle Stuckist Stonecarvers founded in 2001 by Graham Wilson
- The Perth Stuckists founded in 2003 by Godfrey Blow
- The Adelaide Stuckists founded in 2008 by Kay Bridge
- The Sydney Stuckists founded in 2008 by Rone Waugh
- The Brisbane Stuckists founded in 2010 by Krisstie Byrnne
- The Canberra Stuckists founded in 2010 by Nasser Palangi

== UK origin ==
The Stuckists were founded in the United Kingdom by Charles Thomson and Billy Childish with ten other artists in 1999 to oppose conceptual art and champion painting as the radical medium of self-discovery. The name was derived by Thomson from an insult by Tracey Emin to her ex-boyfriend Childish that he was "stuck", which he had recorded in a poem. The Stuckists have since become an accepted part of the UK art scene and are studied in the educational system, but still remain largely ostracised by the art establishment for their stringent criticisms of it, particularly of the Britart, the Saatchi Gallery and the Turner Prize. They have also launched the period of Remodernism—"A renewal of spirituality and meaning in art, culture and society".

== Antipodeans Group ==
An earlier group of seven artists in Australia (six of them Melbourne based) called the Antipodeans Group also issued a manifesto to promote modern figurative painting in opposition to the prevailing orthodoxy, which at that time was Abstract Expressionism. This was launched in a show of the artists in Melbourne in August 1959. They stated that figurative art "communicates because it has the capacity to refer to experiences that the artist shares with his audience", and that "the image, the recognizable shape, the meaningful symbol, is the basic unit of the artists' language". Like the Stuckists they were accused of conservatism and reaction.

== See also ==
Mother by Basil Kouvalis

- Art manifesto
- Art of Australia
- Antipodeans Group

== Bibliography ==
- Ed. Frank Milner (2004), "The Stuckists Punk Victorian" National Museums Liverpool, ISBN 1-902700-27-9
