= Bashir Baraki =

Australian-American artist

- Born: 3 March 1943; Greenville, North Carolina, United States
- Died: 26 October 1998 (aged 55); Melbourne, Victoria, Australia
- Known for: Photography, printmaking, video art

Bashir Baraki (3 March 1943 – 26 October 1998) was an American-born Australian artist of Lebanese descent whose work encompassed photography, printmaking and video. His art explored gay male sexuality, Catholic imagery and his Lebanese heritage.

== Biography ==
Baraki was born in Greenville, North Carolina, in 1943 to Lebanese immigrant parents. He spent part of his childhood in Lebanon and studied art in Virginia in the early 1960s. He subsequently lived and worked in Christchurch, New Zealand, before moving to Melbourne in 1977.

Baraki was gay and was raised as a Roman Catholic. His father's family was Muslim, and his mother later converted to Judaism. He undertook doctoral studies at Monash University. He died of cancer in Melbourne on 26 October 1998.

== Career ==
Baraki proposed the idea for The Naked Image, an exhibition of nude photography, in discussions with Australian Centre for Contemporary Art director John Buckley. The exhibition's 1986 catalogue credits these discussions as the origin of the project.

The Australian Centre for Contemporary Art (ACCA) presented Bashir Baraki: Photographic Survey 1980–87 from 29 May to 28 June 1987. Curated by Linda Hicks, the exhibition included portraits concentrating on the hands and faces of Peter Booth, Beatrice Faust and Bruce Pollard, alongside photographs of male nudes.

In 1989 he participated in Imaging AIDS, presented at ACCA and Linden Gallery during the Midsumma Festival. The exhibition examined the representation of AIDS and the identities of people affected by the epidemic. He was also included in You Are Here, curated by Scott Redford and Luke Roberts at Brisbane's Institute of Modern Art in 1992.

== Artistic practice ==
Baraki combined religious iconography with erotic imagery, producing sexually explicit photographs during the AIDS crisis. The Queer Australian Art database associates the unsettling qualities of his photographs with the paintings of Francis Bacon and Francisco Goya.

His practice extended to colour photocopying, computer-generated imagery, painting, installation and video. In Australian Football and Giotto's "The Lamentation of Christ", he paired a newspaper photograph of an injured Australian rules footballer with a reproduction of Giotto's depiction of Christ, drawing attention to their similar bodily arrangements.

In the years before his death, Baraki made videos featuring improvised interviews with Judas, Mary and Mary Magdalene, alongside a silent dance by Lazarus. Christ remained absent from the videos. Scholars Roland Boer and Ibrahim Abraham discussed these works as reinterpretations of biblical narratives informed by Baraki's position within Australian gay and migrant cultures.

== Collections ==
The National Gallery of Victoria holds an untitled work from Baraki's Lebanon series (1978–1987), composed of Polaroid photographs and donated by his estate in 2000. The Queensland Art Gallery holds Tiananmen Square Incident, June, 1989, a work made from colour photocopies on eight sheets, acquired in 1991 through the John Darnell Bequest.
