= Pinacotheca (disambiguation) =

A pinacotheca (Latin) or pinakotheke (Greek) is an ancient Greek or Roman picture gallery. Places referred to by this name include the Pinakotheke on the Acropolis of Athens.

Pinacotheca may also refer to:

- Pinacotheca, Melbourne
- Pinacotheca (Doctor Who)
