= Godfrey Blow =

Australian artist

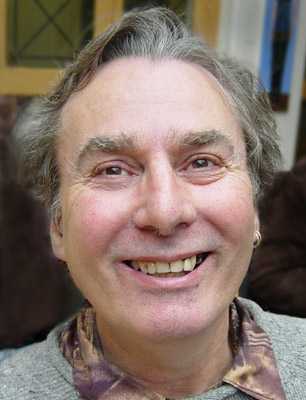
- Born: 6 October 1948 (age 77); England
- Known for: Painting
- Movement: Stuckism

Godfrey Blow (born 6 October 1948) is a British-born contemporary artist based in Kalamunda, Western Australia. A painter whose work is inspired by myths and mythical landscapes, he founded the Perth Stuckists in 2003.

== Life and art ==
Emergence of the green religion by Godfrey Blow

Godfrey Blow was born in North Hykeham, Lincolnshire, England on the same day as fellow Stuckist artist, Eamon Everall. After attending Sheffield Hallam University where he gained a BA Hons degree and Manchester Metro University, where he qualified as a teacher, Blow emigrated to Australia in 1982. Since then he has made his living by teaching and through his artwork. More recently the emphasis has been on his art, as his work has increasingly become a featured part of private and public collections in Australia, including Artbank, The Art Gallery of Western Australia, University of Western Australia and the collections of the cities of Bunbury, Albany and Fremantle.

In 2001 Judith McGrath reviewed his 2001 solo show at The Church Gallery:

We seem to travel from the rich dark realms of the troglodyte to the light bright hues of angels ... There is a certain spirituality drifting through Blow's images, if you discover it, despite some of the tortured forms, you'll find the. exhibition is an uplifting experience.

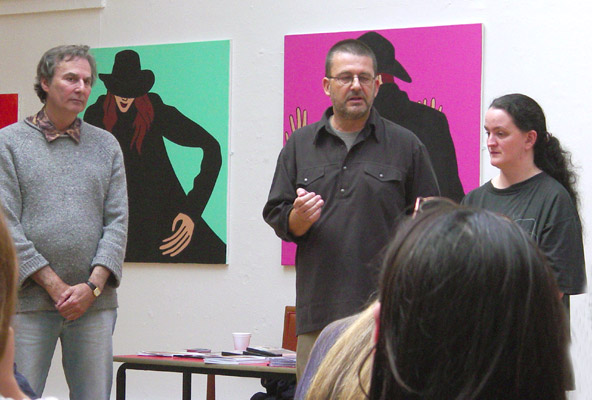
Left to right: Godfrey Blow, Odysseus Yakoumakis and Jacqueline Jones at The Triumph of Stuckism show and symposium, Liverpool Biennial 2006.

He first joined the Stuckists in 2002, when he founded the Perth Stuckists after a conversation with Stuckism founder, Charles Thomson. Since then he has exhibited with the group, most notably in their landmark exhibition, The Stuckists Punk Victorian at the Walker Art Gallery during the 2004 Liverpool Biennial. He is also one of the featured artists exhibiting in the Triumph of Stuckism; an exhibition of new Stuckist paintings curated by Naive John, which comprises part of Liverpool's 2006 Biennial.

His highly finished paintings are worked on over many months, and draw mainly from the often arid and rocky landscape which surrounds his home. In his use of hot, earth colours and crisp detail, he is quintessentially an Australian artist pursuing typically Australian themes. In October 2006, Blow was a finalist in Australia's richest award for landscape painting, the Fleurieu Peninsula Biennale Art Prize.

== Exhibitions ==
Solo Shows.

- 2014 Harvison Gallery, Landscape, Sea and Beyond, 195 Brisbane Street, Perth
- 2006 Stafford Studios, "Symbols & Metaphors", Cottesloe, Perth, W.A.
- 2001 Church Gallery, Claremont, Perth, W.A.
- 1998 Gomboc Gallery, James Street, Middle Swan, W.A.
- 1996 Gomboc Gallery, James Street, Middle Swan, W.A.
- 1993 The Geraldton Regional Gallery, 24 Chapman Road, Geraldton, W.A.
- 1992 Lawrence Wilson Art Gallery,"Facing the Dawn", University of Western Australia, Perth, W.A.
- 1989 Fremantle Arts Centre, Fremantle, W.A.
- 1986 Quentin Gallery, Claremont, Perth, W.A.
- 1984 Undercroft Gallery, University of Western Australia, Perth, W.A.
- 1983 Fremantle Arts Centre, Fremantle, W.A.
- Glyde Gallery, Mosman Park, Perth, W.A.
- 1980 Hendon Library, Hendon, London, England.
- 1976 Barnet Arts Centre, London, England.

== Collections ==
- The Art Gallery of Western Australia
- Curtin University of Technology
- City of Bunbury
- Artbank
- Education Department of Western Australia
- Holmes a Court Collection
- The University of Western Australia
- Sir Charles Gairdner Hospital
- City of Fremantle
- City of Albany
- Sheffield Hallam University
- Dr John Collis
- Various private collections in Australia, France, India & U.K.

== Awards ==
- 1984 Bunbury City Invitation Art Purchase Award, WA.
- 1985 Western Australia Week Invitation Art Award, WA.
- 1987 Silver Anniversary Art Award, 25th Albany Art Competition, WA.
- 1987 Highly Commended, Royal Agricultural Society of WA Invitation Art Award, WA.
- 1993 Highly Commended, The City of Gosnells Art Award, WA.
- 2002 Cossack Art Award, Category:Painting, WA.
- 2006 Finalist for The Fleurieu Peninsula Biennial Art Prize for Australian Landscape Painting, South Australia.
- 2007 Highly Commended, Minnawarra Art Award, City of Armadale, WA.
- 2007 Mandorla Art Award Finalist, WA.

== Books ==
- Germaine, Max "Artists and Galleries of Australia", 1990
- Rykes, Graham "A Buyers Guide to Australian Art", 1992
- Thorpe, D.W. "Who's Who of Australian Visual Artists", 1995
- Ed. Frank Milner, 2004, "The Stuckists Punk Victorian" National Museums Liverpool, ISBN 1-902700-27-9

== See also ==
- Stuckism
- Stuckism in Australia
- Regan Tamanui
- The Stuckists Punk Victorian
