= Michel Lawrence =

- Born: 16 October 1948 (age 78); Kings Cross, New South Wales, Australia
- Known for: Photography

Michel Lawrence (born 1948) is an Australian writer, advertising creative director, portrait photographer and documentary director. He also produced two photographic books, Framed: Photographs of Australian Artists and All of Us, documenting the multicultural makeup of Australia.

== Early life and education ==
Lawrence matriculated from Camberwell Grammar School in Melbourne and enrolled at La Trobe University in its first year, becoming the foundation editor of the student newspaper Rabelais.

== Career ==
On leaving university, Lawrence began work as a journalist at the national daily newspaper, The Australian. At News Ltd, Lawrence worked for the Sunday Australian and The Sunday Telegraph as a political columnist covering both state and federal politics. After leaving The Australian in 1976, he founded and edited Australia's first skateboard magazine, Slicks.

Lawrence was recruited to manage Australian electric folk group, The Bushwackers, departing in 1976 with the band for an extended 18-month tour of Europe including England, Scotland and Wales, and recording their album Murrumbidgee at Morgan's Studios, London.

Returning to Australia in 1978, Lawrence founded the design studio Swell Productions which became the advertising agency Burrows Doble Lawrence, with Art Director Bill Burrows and agency Account Director Ed Doble. The agency was sold to D'Arcy Masius Benton & Bowles and Lawrence was headhunted to the Australian retail agency Mattingly and Partners as its Executive Creative Director. During this period he was also President of the Melbourne Art Directors’ Club.

In 1990, Lawrence was appointed Executive Creative Director of the multi-national agency J. Walter Thompson, eventually being appointed managing director of the Melbourne Office in 1998 and then Australian Chairman a year later.

In 2001 while chairman of JWT, Lawrence was asked about the collapse of Australian airline Ansett, in the midst of a pitch for the airline's business. Lawrence told AdNews, "marketing and advertising were never the problems, and neither was ever going to solve deep-seated difficulties [at Ansett]."

During a period of 10 years, Lawrence embarked on a personal project to photograph one hundred of Australia's most important postwar modernists including Sidney Nolan, Lloyd Rees, Arthur Boyd, Donald Friend, Sam Fullbrook, Jeffrey Smart, Elwyn Lynn, David Larwill and John Wolseley. This became an exhibition at Australian Galleries Melbourne and Sydney in 1996. Two years later the exhibition was published as the book, Framed: Photographs of Australian Artists, published by Hardie Grant. The book's cover portrait of Lloyd Rees had previously been a cover of the Sydney Morning Herald/Age magazine "Good Weekend", illustrating an article on the artist by Janet Hawley winning her a Walkley Award. Hawley also contributed the introduction to the book Framed.

Lawrence's second book, All of Us includes photographs of people born in 200 other countries, but who were now living in Australia. The project was inspired by the 2005 Cronulla riots. All of Us was published by Scribe Books and the portraits exhibited at Federation Square, Melbourne and later in a tour of Indian cities. The 'All of Us' project was launched at Federation Square by the Victorian Premier, John Brumby for Australia Day 2008 and was funded by Federal and State governments along with private benefactors.

A subsequent project, 'Indian Aussies' was commissioned by the Australian Department of Foreign Affairs and has been touring India after its launch in New Delhi in 2013.

== Cinematography ==
In 2012, Lawrence's production company Miro Films began producing the television arts program InsideArt, which has run four seasons across Australian public broadcasters in Melbourne, Sydney and Perth. In 2014, InsideArt was voted Most Outstanding Australian Arts Program across the public broadcasting network at the Antenna Awards.

== Collections ==
- The National Portrait Gallery in Canberra,
- The National Library in Canberra,
- The Queensland Art Gallery (QAGOMA),
- The Museum of Modern Art at Heide,
- Melbourne University
- Castlemaine Art Museum
- Lismore Art Gallery
- Performing Arts Museum, Melbourne
