= Regan Tamanui =

Australian artist

- Born: Melbourne, Australia
- Known for: Painting
- Movement: Stuckism

Captain Anthrax Vs Doctor Death in the arena of Tiki's by Regan Tamanui

Regan Tamanui is an artist based in Melbourne, Australia. In October 2000, he founded the Melbourne Stuckists, the fourth Stuckist of the original Stuckist groups and the first outside the United Kingdom. He has also painted prolifically as a street artist under the tag name HA-HA.

== Career ==
In October 2000, Regan Tamanui, a jazz, ska and skank fan, discovered the London Stuckist group whilst surfing the internet. He sent an email and then founded the Melbourne Stuckists. He saw "The main (point) that really stood out was the ability to wake up and paint pictures." This was the fourth Stuckist group to be started, and the first one outside the UK, thus launching an international movement that by 2006 counted 127 groups in 32 countries. On 27 October 2000 he staged the first Stuckist show outside the UK, when he mounted the Real Turner Prize Show at the Dead End Gallery in his home in Reno Road, Sandringham, concurrent with three shows of the same title (two in England and one in Germany) in protest against the Tate Gallery's Turner Prize.

Besides Tamanui, the other initial members of the Melbourne group were Justin Grub, Ben Blanchette, Malcome Mmackie and Dave Freeman Rose. A subsequent line-up was Basil Kouvelis, Justin Grubb, Ben Frost, Nigel Stein, Daniel Gorzadek, Stephen Sperling and Dennis Roper. Tamanui expressed his and the group's artistic philosophy:

There are some people who shit in a tin. Is that really art?

In May 2001, Tamanui, Stein, Grubb and Kouvelis were represented with 24 international groups in the London show Vote Stuckist, so named because Stuckist co-founder, Charles Thomson, was standing as a candidate in the 2001 United Kingdom general election against the then-Culture Secretary, Chris Smith.

In November 2001, the Melbourne Stuckists staged a show Houdini to Hofmann at the Chiara Goya Gallery, which included some UK Stuckist work for the first time.

Kaye Blum made a short documentary on the group, Art Gets Unstuck. The film is structured around the artists reading lines from the Stuckists Manifesto written by Charles Thomson and Billy Childish. It was first shown at the Jaffas Down the Aisle film festival in Melbourne in October 2001, then in 2002 at the International Film Festival of Fine Art in Hungary and the Asolo Arts Film Festival in Italy, where it was nominated for best student short.

In July 2002, Tamanui, along with other Australian Stuckists was shown at The First Stuckist International, the inaugural show of the Stuckism International Gallery, Shoreditch, London. The show also included Godfrey Blow who had followed Tamanui's lead and founded a Perth Stuckists group.

In October 2002, Tamanui opened the Stuckism International Centre Australia, with an ongoing exhibition of work, as well as the first international Stuckist show in Australia, Stuck Down South, at the FAD Gallery. This included founding Stuckists, Thomson, Ella Guru and Sexton Ming. (Like the London gallery it has now ceased operating.)

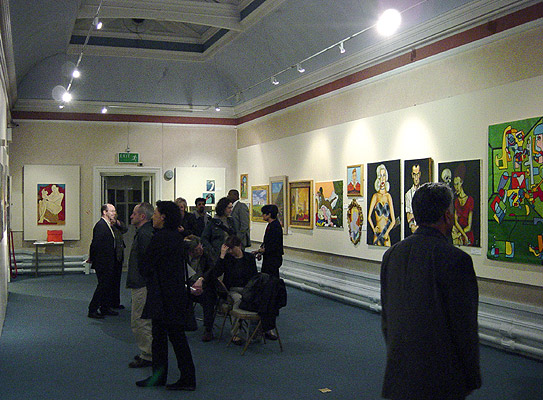
Tamanui's work (painting on right) in the Stuck in Wednesbury show.

In March 2003, Tamanui was exhibited in Stuck in Wednesbury, the Stuckists' first show in a public gallery, held in Wednesbury Museum and Art Gallery, England.

Since 2004, Tamanui has been represented by Criterion Gallery in Hobart. He has made a successful transition to the commercial gallery arena, with art collectors increasingly interested in his street inspired stencilling. Tamanui's work can be found in the collection of BHP, the State Library Victoria, the City of Melbourne, Artbank, and the National Gallery of Australia, who purchased a number of works for their permanent collection.

== Art ==
Tamanui takes his lead from Picasso and American pop artist Shag. His work is "large, vibrantly colored, pop-art style paintings", often showing several figures interacting. Since 2001 he has exhibited his work in both a solo and group capacity in Hobart, Melbourne, Adelaide, Sydney, New Zealand, United States and London.

== Media coverage ==
The Australian presence (Tamanui's group) was first noted in an article on the Stuckists in the UK Observer Sunday newspaper in May 2000.

The participation of the Australian Stuckists in the London Vote Stuckist show in 2001 occasioned a double page spread in the leading Melbourne paper The Age. Tamanui's initiative in speaking out provoked a similar range of reactions to the ones the UK group had received in Britain. Melbourne painter David Larwill said, "It's the best thing I've heard in ages." Max Delaney, director of public gallery 200 Gertrude Street, accused the Melbourne group of "revisionism" and "publicity and marketing". Su Baker, head of the School of Art, Victorian College of the Arts, wrote it off as "a cheap shot" (the same accusation which Sir Nicholas Serota had levelled at Thomson in London. Melbourne curator, Juliana Engberg, said, "They are an aberrant version of conceptualism by default, using the same devices to promote something that's very conservative."

Four years later, in April 2005 The Age ran a reprise of Stuckism and observed:

Stuckists have been dismissed by many as 'rebels without a cause', but their influence is, well, sticking... The Stuckists have not beaten Saatchi, but he may be joining them.

== Stuckism ==
The Stuckists are a radical pro-painting group and are anti-conceptual art. The movement was started by Charles Thomson and Billy Childish (who has since left) in the United Kingdom in 1999 with eleven other artists and is now an international movement. They are noted for their "Agitprop" against the Turner Prize and Britart.

== See also ==
- Stuckism in Australia
- Godfrey Blow

== Books ==
- Ed. Frank Milner (2004) "The Stuckists Punk Victorian", National Museum Liverpool, ISBN 1-902700-27-9
