= Pinacotheca, Melbourne =

Art gallery located in Melbourne, Australia 1967–2002

Coordinates: 37.820377°S 144.997693°E

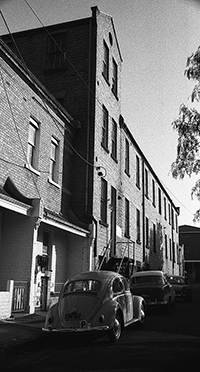
Wes Placek (1971) Facade of the Pinacotheca Gallery building in Waltham Place, Richmond, Melbourne

Pinacotheca was a gallery in Melbourne, Australia. Established in 1967 by Bruce Pollard, it was ideologically committed to the avant-garde and represented a new generation of artists interested in post-object, conceptual and other non-traditional art forms.

== History ==
Bruce Pollard opened the Pinacotheca gallery in May 1967, at 1 Fitzroy Street, a dark St Kilda bayside Edwardian mansion.

He relocated it to Bedggood's Shoe Factory, at 10 Waltham Place, Richmond, Melbourne in June 1970. An early owner of the building was notorious entrepreneur D. J. Henry 'Money' Miller.

The gallery closed in October 1999 and the business was de-registered in 2001, but re-opened in August 2002 for its very last exhibition, then closed permanently.

== Ethos ==
After the demise of John Reed's Museum of Modern Art Australia in 1966, Pinacotheca became the only gallery in Melbourne showing experimental work in the late 1960s and 1970s, exhibiting works by Art Language artists Ian Burn, Roger Cutforth and Mel Ramsden, and Dale Hickey's ironic 1969 work in which he commissioned a fencing contractor to install suburban-style fences of unpainted planks around the walls, of different heights tailored to the gallery's three separate rooms; the first only knee-high, the second intermediate and the third about chin level.

Pinacotheca's exhibitors were in the vanguard of Conceptualism; during The Field, the controversial show of Australian conceptual abstraction that opened the new premises of the National Gallery of Victoria on St Kilda Road, Pinacotheca, then in St Kilda, and concurrently with the NGV show, advertised 'for viewing' 15 of The Field artists in its stockroom alongside a solo by Rollin Schlicht; then in the next year, Joseph Kosuth coordinated the "exhibition" of part of his Second Investigation at several international galleries, each chosen as being adventurous venues showing conceptual art, that included the Pasadena Art Museum, Leo Castelli Gallery (New York), and Pinacotheca. The work was initiated by, and was executed in, Kosuth's request of the gallery directors to advertise his Second Investigation in newspapers, with any further action being left to them. Bruce Pollard placed Kosuth's statements as advertisements in national newspapers, including The Age, The Sun News-Pictorial and Newsday from his own funds.

Pinacotheca's avant-garde stance was paralleled only by Sydney's Inhibodress and Watters galleries, and indeed in 1977 a show Watters at Pinacotheca, during 4–28 May, showed Suzanna Archer, John Armstrong, George Barker, Jenny Barwell, Vivienne Binns, Hilary Burns, Tim Burns, James Clifford, Tony Coleing, Aleks Danko, John Delacour, Helen Eager, Jeanne Eager, Stephen Earle, Marr Grounds, Adrian Hall, Ian Howard, Noel Hutchison, Robert Jenyns, Ron Lambert, Richard Larter, Bruce Latimer, Frank Littler, Bridgid McLean, Marie McMahon, Patricia Moylan, Chris O'Doherty, Robert Parr, John Peart, Geoffrey Proud, David Rankin, Jon Rhodes, Ken Searle, Imants Tillers, Tony Tuckson, Vicki Varvaressos, Robin Wallace-Crabbe, and Max Watters. In 1984 David Thomas described the work exhibited at Pinacotheca, Watters and Inhibodress:

Already by 1970 Pinacotheca Gallery in Melbourne was a focus for reflective, quiet concern with everyday life, its processes and its visual banalities, as in the work of Robert Rooney and Dale Hickey. Watters Gallery in Sydney was a centre for the rougher, more casual, funky art of Mike Brown, Tony Coleing and John Armstrong. Inhibodress Sydney, 1970–72 was the place to see conceptual art, body art, performance and video by Mike Parr and Peter Kennedy.

Its spacious accommodation in Richmond was in impression not unlike a New York SoHo loft, and supported a similar sensibility;

...a large concrete expanse, broken by scrubbed wooden pillars lay beyond the forbidding metal door. It was austerity and doggedness in timber, bricks and mortar, the aesthetic was primitive and cool, the art work was stripped of anything reassuring, and if the lights were off the visitor was expected to turn them on...Clive Murray White described the aesthetic of the gallery as having the "air of New York: if you took a photograph of your work, it would look like a major international avant-garde show." Jonathon Sweet.

Its ambience was described by Ailsa O'Connor in a 1977 review as "austere, almost dungeon like", but it was well suited to the display of large works by Peter Booth, Dale Hickey, Robert Hunter and Robert Rooney who were some of the first artists represented there, in a group exhibition.

In 1971–72 the gallery operated as an artists' cooperative of around twenty, including Robert Hunter, Bill Anderson, Jonas Balsaitis, Peter Booth, Dale Hickey, Simon Klose and Robert Rooney, while Pollard was travelling overseas. During this period Mike Brown, Kevin Mortenson and Russell Drever, with numbers of others held the Dada-ist happening The Opening Leg Show Party-Bizarre. Patrick McCaughey, The Age art critic, described it as "more or less, according to taste, than clean good fun"

Pollard's early attitude to representing women artists was exposed in 1975 when Kiffy Rubbo, curator (1971–1979) at the avant-garde George Paton/Ewing Gallery asked Lesley Dumbrell to escort Lucy Lippard, a feminist critic of Pop Art and Minimalism who was then visiting from the United States as part of celebrations for International Women's Year. They visited galleries including Pinacotheca. When Pollard invited Lippard to view the stock room, she explained she was interested only in seeing women artists and he was unable to show her any. Pollard took umbrage and Lippard walked out, after berating him.

== Exhibitions ==
Over its 33-year history, more than 300 artists showed at Pinacotheca, including significant and challenging art by Australians Rosalie Gascoigne, James Gleeson, Bill Henson, Tim Johnson, Tony Tuckson and Stelarc. Ti Parks was the last artist to show there in August 2002.

An example of the often hermetic austerity of some exhibitions was Hunter's 1970 solo show for which he stencilled 11 grids onto the gallery's walls with grey paint, explaining later that : "I want to make something alien - alien to myself" and described his intention to avoid the creation of objets d'art. As minimal and more cryptic still, conceptually, was Robert Rooney/Simon Klose (Collaboration), from 10–20 August 1972, consisting of banks of deadpan photographic prints of urban landscape and interiors, with bluestone pitchers installed in grids on the gallery floor. Critic Patrick McCaughey, announced it a symptom of ‘the demise of the avant-garde into the easy, the predictable, the familiar,’ while Alan McCulloch reported that it was 'Everything or Perhaps Nothing.' They were unaware that the defiant conceptual premise of the show was Klose's proposition that the pair should each produce work for the other—in the other's style and presenting it as theirs—and yet reveal the fact to no-one, even the critics, when questioned by visitors to the gallery, bar a few intimate friends.

=== Selected exhibitions ===
In an anti-establishment gesture, documentation and catalogues were deliberately kept to a minimum and consequently parts of Pinacotheca's exhibition history is limited and some dates of shows are only approximate, while precise details are being assembled by Trevor Fuller, custodian and convenor of the Pinacotheca archive project.

St Kilda

- 1967: Sunday 25 June – Friday 14 July. David Gillison, Paintings
- 1967: Sunday 30 July – Friday 18 August 1967. John Martin, Paintings
- 1967: Sunday 20 August – Friday 1 September. Judy Lorraine, Ceramics
- 1967: Sunday 3 September – Friday 22 September. June Stephenson, Paintings
- 1967: Sunday 24 September – Friday 13 October. Margaret Dredge, Paintings
- 1967: Sunday 15 October 3 – Friday 3 November. Two Printmakers: Normana Wight and C. Tolley
- 1967: Sunday 12 November – Wednesday 29 November. Brian Kewley, Paintings
- 1967: Sunday 3 December – Sunday 24 December. Bruce Petty, Cartoon Collages, Drawings
- 1968: February – March. Trevor Kretchmer, Magic Clowns, Paintings
- 1968: March. Erica Baneth-Goodey, Sculpture, bronze and aluminium casting; relief casting and woodwork
- 1968: April. Barry Cleavin, Graphics and Robert Trauer, Prints
- 1968: 14 May – 26 May. John Davis, Margaret Dredge, Dale Hickey, Robert Hunter, Michael Johnson, Alun Leach-Jones, Ken Leveson, Victor Majzner, Tony McGillick, Dick Watkins, Normana Wight, The Renting Collection, Paintings, prints, drawings, sculpture.
- 1968: June. Vynol Students' Expo
- 1968: 18 June – 2 July. Robert Hall, Paintings
- 1968: 7 July – 24 July. Martha Ash, Dorothy Baker, Alexander Berezowsky, Roy Fauvel, Erika Huppert, Karlis Mednis, 3 ARTS GROUP
- 1968: 27 July – ? August. Max Cullen, Black Room Collection, rare stamps, prints and metal sculptures
- 1968: August, Allen David
- 1968: August. Pat Shannon, Paintings
- 1968: 25 August – 13 September. Rollin Schlicht, Paintings, and David Allen, Paintings
- 1968: 15 September – 4 October. Alan Oldfield, Drawings
- 1968: 6 October – 18 October. Tony McGillick, Paintings and gouache
- 1968: October. Ti Parks Kevin 'Bulldog' Citizen and Claudia, Mixed media
- 1968: 20 October – 1 November. Bill Gregory, Screenprints on glass and drawings
- 1968: 3 November – 15 November, Anne Grahame, Ronald Greenaway, Michael Smither, June Stepenson, The Essentialists, Paintings and drawings
- 1968: 18 – 29 November Sandra Leveson and Alan Warren, Recent prints
- 1968: November – January 1969. Ti Parks, Three installations
- 1968: December. Judy Lorraine, Alan Warren, Ceramics
- 1969 3 March — 21 March. Brian Kewley, Paintings
- 1969 24 March — 12 April. Peter Booth, Paintings
- 1969 15 April — 26 April. Ron Bence
- 1969 29 April — 15 May. Jeremy Barrett, Paintings
- 1969 18 May — 31 May. Margaret Worth, Paintings and drawings
- 1969 4 June — 29 June. Peter Davidson, Sculptures
- 1969 23 June — 4 July Garrey Foulkes, Paintings
- 1969 7 July — 25 July. Robert Rooney, Canine Capers and Cereal Bird Beaks, Paintings
- 1969 28 July — 7 August. The Two Victors; Victor Majzner, Victor Seredin, Paintings
- 1969 10 August — 22 August. Ian Burn, Roger Cutforth, Mel Ramsden, Prints and photographs
- 1969 24 August — 5 September. Trevor Vickers
- 1969 8 September — 19 September. George Johnson
- 1969 2 September — 3 October. Michael Goss
- 1969 6 October — 17 October. Warren Knight, Concrete poetry, painting
- 1969 22 October — 31 October. Dale Hickey, Fences, Installations
- 1969 31 October — 14 November. Joseph Kosuth, The second investigation. 15 locations 1969/1970; art as idea; the communication of ideas
- 1970 Monday 8 June- Saturday 27 June. Peter Booth, Mike Brown, Peter Davidson, Bill Gregory, Dale Hickey, Robert Hunter, Kevin Mortensen, Ti Parks, Robert Rooney, Rollin Slicht, Trevor Vickers, Painting, Sculpture, Installation
- 1970 July. Rollin Schlicht, Painting
- 1970 July. Graham Mathews, Painting
- 1970 July. Robert Hunter, Stencil wall paintings (11 grids 6ftx6ft stencilled on walls)
- 1970 Tuesday 11 August-Saturday 22 August. Ross Grounds, Seven Steel Frames, Sculpture/ Installation
- 1970 Tuesday 25 August- Saturday 5 September. Peter Booth, Painting and Drawing
- 1970 1 September-18 September. Denis Spiteri, The Incredible, The Baroque, Riddle Suite, Paintings
- 1970 Tuesday 8-Saturday 19 September, Robert Rooney, Paintings and Photographs
- 1970 Burn, Ian
- 1970 22 September-3 October. Dale Hickey, 90 White Walls, Photography
- 1970 Tuesday 22 September-Saturday 3 October. Jonas Balsaitis, Image of Mind, Paintings
- 1970 22 September-3 October. Robert Rooney, Superknits and Snaps, Painting and Photography
- 1970 Tuesday 6 October Saturday 17 October. Bill Gregory
- 1970 Tuesday 20 October - Saturday 31 October. Peter D. Cole, Sculpture
- 1970 Tuesday 17 November-Saturday 28 November. Peter Petrucelli, Paintings
- 1970 Tuesday 1 December-Saturday 12 December. Simon Klose, Photographic Concept of The Cube, Photography
- 1970 Tuesday 3 November-Saturday 14 November. Robert Hall, Paintings
- 1970 3 November-14 November. Alex Selenitsch, 8 Monotones, Silk screened cards in envelope/concrete poetry
- 1970 Tuesday 17 November-Saturday 28 November. Mike Brown, Collages and prints
- 1970 Tuesday 1 December-Saturday 12 December. William Anderson, Work in Progress 1969-1970, Paintings, Spray Painting, text, cardboard models, drawings, street plans, plexiglass model

Richmond

- 1970: Robert Rooney: War savings streets
- 1970, 25 Aug—5 Sept: Peter Booth solo exhibition
- 1971: 4 Conceptual Artists: Mel Ramsden, Ian Burn, Joseph Kosuth, Robert Rooney, Pinacotheca, Melbourne, with catalogue by Rooney
- 1971, May: Welcome to Planet X Mike Brown
- 1971: Kevin Mortenson performance The Seagull Salesman, his Goods and Visitors or Figures of Identification
- 1971: Robert Hunter
- 1971: Peter Booth
- 1971: Wes Placek (solo)
- 1972 Jonas Balsaitis: Metron painting series
- 1972: Film Construction. Installation by Colin Suggett with Peter Cole
- 1972: The Opening Leg Show Party-Bizarre: Mike Brown, Kevin Mortenson and Russell Drever
- 1972, 10–20 Aug: RR/SK: Public Exhibition
- 1972: Wes Placek (solo)
- 1973: Wes Placek (solo)
- 1973: Robert Hunter
- 1973: John Nixon (solo)
- 1975: Jonas Balsaitis: ProcesProcess a film
- 1975: Jim Paterson
- 1975: Peter Booth
- 1976: Jonas Balsaitis: Drawings
- 1977, 4–28 May: Watters at Pinacotheca
- 1977: Jonas Balsaitis: Space Time Structures: film
- 1977, to 24 September: George Michelakakis
- 1978: Robert Hunter and American Minimalist Carl Andre: two-person exhibitions
- 1978 Jonas Balsaitis: Artists in Schools Painting Exhibition
- 1979: Irene Barberis: 100 paintings from the everyday - and other materials. First solo show.
- 1979: Magda Matwiejew first solo show.
- 1981 Jonas Balsaitis: Paintings
- 1982 Jonas Balsaitis: Erratica: film
- 1982, to 14 April: Ben Laycock
- 1981: Rosalie Gascoigne* 1981: Ray Hughes Gallery at Pinacotheca, Pinacotheca Art Gallery (Richmond, Vic.) in 1981
- 1981: James Clayden Paintings
- 1982: Steven Cox
- 1982: Magda Matwiejew, Paintings
- 1983: James Clayden
- 1984: David Wadelton: Paintings
- 1984: Rosalie Gascoigne
- 1984: Ken Searle and Frank Littler joint show
- 1984, November: Robert Klippel: bronze sculptures and works on paper
- 1985: Selected works from the last two decades
- 1985: Thirty Years On: a survey of works on paper
- 1985 Jonas Balsaitis: Paintings
- 1985: James Clayden
- 1985, 29 May–15 June: Jill Kahans
- 1985: Steven Cox
- 1986: Geoffrey Bartlett, sculpture.
- 1986: David Wadelton Paintings and works on paper
- 1986 26 July-23 August: Bill Henson, Untitled 1983/84
- 1986, August/September: Three designers: Biltmoderne at Pinacotheca: Architecture, Interiors, Furniture
- 1987, 12 September - 6 October: Trefor Prest : Sculpture
- 1987: Elizabeth Jess Paintings
- 1987: Melinda Harper
- 1988: David Wadelton: Paintings and works on paper
- 1988 Jonas Balsaitis: Paintings
- 1988, 29 June-13 August: Group show Simon Klose, Dale Hickey, Robert Rooney, Trefor Prest, Robert Hunter, Rosalie Gascoigne, David Wadelton, James Gleeson, Douglas Green nand others
- 1988, August-1 September: James Meldrum
- 1989: Tony Tuckson: an exhibition
- 1989 Jonas Balsaitis: Etchings
- 1989: David Wadelton: Paintings and drawings
- 1990: Dennis Spiteri : "in pursuit of ecstasy" : A retrospective, 1970-1990
- 1990 Jonas Balsaitis: Paintings
- 1990: Trefor Prest, Melbourne Festival, September–October
- 1991: Contemporary Paintings, Pinacotheca, Richmond (group exhibition)
- 1992: Andrew Taylor Recent Paintings, Pinacotheca, Richmond (solo)
- 1992: David Wadleton: Paintings
- 1993: David Wadleton: Drawings
- 1994: David Wadleton: Paintings
- 1994: Trefor Prest sculpture, Sept–Oct
- 1994: Works on Paper by Valerio Ciccone, Pinacotheca, 1994
- 1996: Works by Valerio Ciccone
- 1996: David Wadleton: Paintings
- 1996: James Gleeson
