= David Wadelton =

Australian artist (born 1955)

- Born: 1955
- Known for: Painting

David Wadelton (born 1955) is an Australian artist who lives and works in Melbourne. He is best known for his cyber-pop paintings, almost photorealist in style.

== Career ==
Since 1984 he has had nearly 20 solo exhibitions in galleries in Melbourne and Sydney, including Pinacotheca, Melbourne and Annandale Galleries Sydney. The most recent exhibitions include Pop Life at Rex Irwin Gallery, 1998; Brand Power, Robert Lindsay Gallery Melbourne 1998; Techno Pop at Robert Lindsay Gallery, Melbourne, 2000; Brand New Release, Tolarno Galleries, Melbourne, 2003 and a solo show at Tolarno Galleries during the 2004 Melbourne Art Fair. He has also been the subject of a major survey exhibition, "Pictorial Knowledge", at Geelong Art Gallery in 1998.

In addition to his painting career Wadelton has played in bands Ad Hoc and Signals with Dave Brown, Philip Thomson, Chris Knowles and James Clayden.

== Exhibitions ==
- 1982 Biennale of Sydney
- National Gallery of Victoria- 2004 Australian Culture Now
- Australian National Gallery
- Art Gallery of New South Wales
- MOCA Sydney
- Contemporary Art Centre of South Australia
- Linden Art Gallery
- Museum of Modern Art at Heide
- Monash University Gallery
- Australian Centre for Contemporary Art
- 200 Gertrude Street Gallery
- City of Ballarat Fine Art Gallery
- Noosa Regional Gallery

== Collections ==
- National Gallery of Victoria
- Australian National Gallery
- Monash University Art Gallery
- La Trobe University Art Collection
- Artbank
- University of Queensland Art Museum
- McClelland Art Gallery
- City of Ballarat Fine Art Gallery
- State Library Victoria
- Australian Opera

== Bibliography ==
- "Australian Painting Now", published by Craftsman House Press in Australia, and by Thames and Hudson in the U.K, 2000, with an essay by Charles Green; and an interview with the artist,
- "From Red Rattlers to Lara Croft" conducted by Robert Rooney in Art & Australia, vol 38, no.2, Spring 2000.
- "Awesome"! By Laura Murray Cree, Craftsman House Press, 2002.
