= Elwyn Lynn =

Australian artist (1917–1997)

- Elwyn Lynn. Photographer Michel Lawrence.
- Born: 6 November 1917; Canowindra, NSW, Australia
- Died: 22 January 1997 (aged 79); Sydney, NSW, Australia
- Occupations: Artist, author, critic and curator

Elwyn (Jack) Lynn (6 November 1917 – 22 January 1997) was an Australian artist, author, art critic and curator.

== Career ==
Elwyn Lynn trained as a teacher, and was a schoolmaster in Sydney Secondary schools until 1968 (mainly English and history). Lynn was self-taught as an artist.

Lynn was Curator of the Power Gallery of Contemporary Art at Sydney University from 1969 to 1983. There he built up an international collection, which is now within the Sydney Museum of Contemporary Art.

Lynn was an art critic at The Australian for many years. He was author of several books, including one about the artist Sir Sidney Nolan.

Alongside his career as a painter, which started in the mid-1940s, Lynn was also an outspoken commentator on the visual arts. In the 1950s and 1960s he edited the Broadsheets of the Contemporary Art Society. He worked as a critic for a number of newspapers, including the Sunday Mirror (1963), The Bulletin (1966-1973), Nation (1969), The Australian (1964-1965) and The Weekend Australian. In 1971 he became Advisory Editor of Art International. For a short time he also edited Art and Australia.

Lynn was awarded Membership of the Order of Australia in 1975. He won the Wynne Prize at the Art Gallery of NSW in 1988. In 1989, he received an Honorary Doctor of Letters from the University of Sydney. In 1994 he received the Emeritus Award from the Australia Council.

== The Art ==
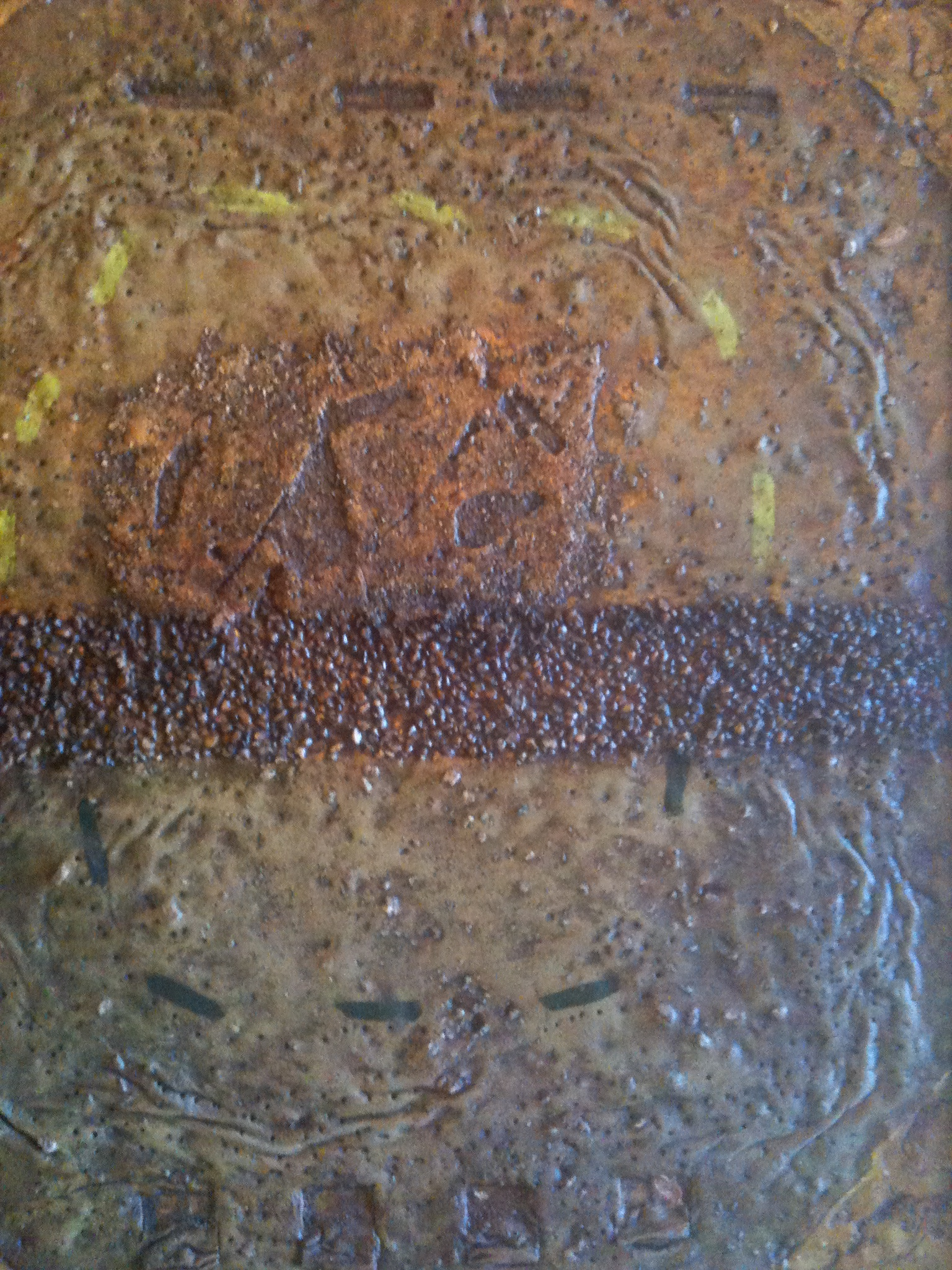
'Cornered' by Elwyn Lynn, 1967

Elwyn Lynn's work was striking, with the use of unconventional painting media and expressive surfaces to construct metaphors for human suffering and endurance. Most of his work was essentially abstract, although a sense of the landscape is often evoked.

Emeritus Professor Peter Pinson noted:

The later work of Lynn maintained his interest in damaged and shredding surfaces, and his frequent and adventurousness use of assemblage elements. These late works were also marked by an expressionist vehemence and a daring informality.

== Prizes ==
Elywn Lynn won the following prizes:

- 1988 Wynne Prize AGNSW
- 1987 University Of NSW Purchase Prize
- 1983 Trustees' Watercolour Prize AGNSW
- 1982 Awarded Atelier at Cite Internationale des Arts, Paris
- 1980 Trustees' Watercolour Prize AGNSW
- 1957 Won Blake Prize for Religious Art, Mosman Art Prize and Bathurst Prize

== Exhibitions ==
Elwyn Lynn participated in over 150 group exhibitions in Australia, New Zealand, United Kingdom, Brazil, Indonesia, Poland and Germany. He had over 50 solo exhibitions in Sydney, Newcastle, Brisbane, Melbourne, Adelaide, Perth and Cologne (Germany).

He has collections in the following galleries:

- National Gallery of Australia
- Art Gallery of NSW
- Queensland Art Gallery
- Art Gallery of South Australia
- Tasmanian Museum and Art Gallery
- Art Gallery of Western Australia
- Queen Victoria Museum and Art Gallery
- Museum and Art Gallery of the Northern Territory
- Museum of Contemporary Art
- Australian War Memorial in Canberra
- Auckland Art Gallery New Zealand
- Federation University Art Collection
- Castlemaine Art Museum

== Bibliography ==
- Elwyn Lynn (1967). Sidney Nolan: Myth and Imagery. London : Macmillan.
- Elwyn Lynn and Sir Sidney Nolan (1979). Sidney Nolan - Australia. Sydney : Bay Books. ISBN 0858353822.
- Elwyn Lynn (1969–1997). Papers of Elwyn Lynn. Unpublished.
- Elwyn Lynn (1986). The art of Robert Juniper. Craftsman House. ISBN 0959344888.
