= The Romantic Anonymous Fellowship =

Stuckist artist collective

Logo of The Romantic Anonymous Fellowship

The Romantic Anonymous Fellowship was founded by the Stuckist painter Odysseus Yakoumakis in September 2004, as the first, and currently the only, Greek group of Stuckism International. It has an international membership.

== History ==
Odysseus Yakoumakis discovered Stuckism in July, 2004, while surfing the net, and saw in it an antidote to what he deems "the ailments of the contemporary Greek 'artscape'". He contacted Charles Thomson, the London founder of Stuckism, and a few days later founded The Romantic Anonymous Fellowship. He conceived this as a "Greek version of Stuckism, an antidote to contemporary Greek art's provincialism, sectarianism and servile importation of post-modernism". He developed the concept of "Romantic Stuckism", that is of "Stuckism with a good injection of Eleatic and Platonic philosophy, oriented rather towards encouraging each artist to pursue his/her genuinely personal artistic vision rather, than towards pointless polemics against the reactionary official art-establishment". He published the first two Romantic Stuckist theoretical texts on the Fellowship's website.

At that stage he was the Fellowship's only fellow and, as far as he knew, the only artist in Greece aware of the Stuckist movement. He contacted other fine artists in Athens, but described the reactions he got as "ranging from a tepid 'academic curiosity' to a sheer lack of interest or even, occasionally, to a politely concealed hostility." He was however contacted by artists from overseas and accepted them into the Fellowship. The first to apply was Ian J. Burkett, a painter living in London and founder of the Ealing Stuckists group. Shortly after, followed the painter and etcher Ilania Abileah from Canada, and the painter and etcher Anthe (who is of Greek descent) from the US.

== Under the Cover of Romantic Anonymity ==
Yakoumakis determined that Stuckism should, nevertheless, be brought "in the flesh" before the eyes of the Greek fine arts community, and organised the first Stuckist event in Greece, titled Under the Cover of Romantic Anonymity, announced for May 14 of 2010 at the Ash-In-Art Gallery, Athens, Greece.

In parallel with the show, the new book by Odysseus Yakoumakis will be featured, titled "Leaflets from the Wilderness (a case study about the artscape in nouveau-Greece and many other lands)" (Ash-In-Art Publications).

Stuckist artists taking part include:

- Ilania Abileah
- ANTHE
- Ian J. Burkett
- Odysseus Yakoumakis

Guest artists participating are:

- Ray Wilkins
- Lefteris Yakoumakis
- Vasilis Selimas
- Nickos Delijannis

== See also ==
- Stuckism
- Remodernism
- Odysseus Yakoumakis
