= Odysseus Yakoumakis =

Greek artist

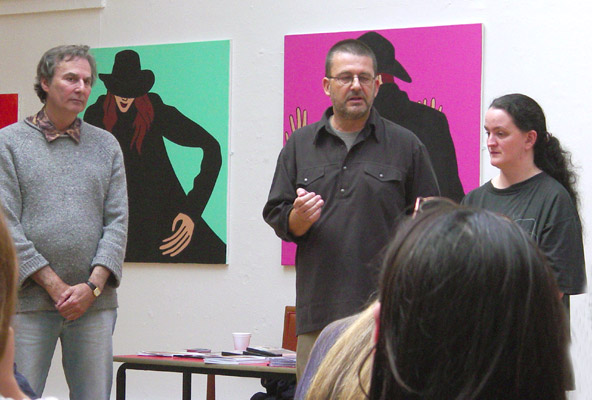
- Odysseus Yakoumakis (centre) at The Triumph of Stuckism show and symposium, Liverpool, 2006, with Godfrey Blow (left) and Jacqueline Jones (right)
- Born: 1956 (age 69–70); Athens, Greece
- Known for: Painting, Illustration
- Movement: Stuckism

Odysseus Yakoumakis (Greek: Οδυσσέας Γιακουμάκης; born 1956) is a Stuckist artist, painter and illustrator, based in Athens, Greece. He is the founder of the first Greek Stuckist group, The Romantic Anonymous Fellowship, and organiser of the first international Stuckist group show in Greece, Under the Cover of Romantic Anonymity. He was a scheduled speaker at the first Stuckist international symposium, The Triumph of Stuckism, in England. He practises martial arts and he is currently studying traditional engraving.

== Life and art ==
Michael Odysseus Yakoumakis was born in Athens, Greece. He studied painting at the "Scuola Libera del Nudo" of the Accademia di Belle Arti di Napoli in Naples and obtained a laurea in geological science from the university of the same city. (Note: "Laurea" is the Italian tertiary degree, between BSc and MSc.) He gained a post-graduate diploma in Computer Science from the Institute of Informatics of EL.KE.PA. (Hellenic Centre for the Enhancement of Productivity) in Athens. He also completed free studies in Sumi-e and traditional Chinese painting, engraving, artistic book-binding and graphic design (this last at the Athens Technological Education Institute).

He worked in various parts of the globe, in parallel as an engineering geologist, systems engineer and visual artist. From 2003, he has focused exclusively on the Visual Arts and settled down in Athens, where he works as a painter, illustrator and writer of fantasy fiction, graphic designer and Visual Arts instructor. His art has been shown in solo shows in Athens and group exhibitions in Athens, Montreal, Nicosia, London, Rome, Hamburg, Liverpool and Florence.

His artistic oeuvre aims "to express ideas, ideals and feelings and to convey messages at the personal, social, political, philosophical and mystic levels". He contrasts the Post-modern era with what he describes as "older, perhaps much happier and certainly more interesting times". He has increasingly used anthropocentric subject matter and a more minimalist use of a vocabulary of mythological symbols drawn from "ancient traditions of the Earth" and from his own subconscious," in a satire of "life-style", "technology", "anti-art", "economic power" and "wealth". His nostalgia is obsessive. His style combines elements from the schools of the Italian Renaissance, the Flemish and German “Primitives”, the Japanese Sumi-e and the Chinese Gonbi and Xieyi, the movements of figurative Expressionism and Surrealism, and from certain genres of European comics. He divides his current oeuvre into "Principal", "Expressionistic" and "Japanistic".

=== Previous projects ===
Yakoumakis was one of the featured artists exhibiting in "The Triumph of Stuckism", an exhibition of new Stuckist paintings curated by Naive John, as part of the 2006 Liverpool Biennial. He is also billed as one of the speakers at the accompanying International Symposium at Liverpool John Moores University in October 2006.

=== Current projects ===
Yakoumakis is currently curating Under the Cover of Romantic Anonymity, an international Stuckists group show in Athens, Greece, billed for May 1 - May 14 of 2010 at the "Ash-In-Art" Gallery. Stuckist artists taking part include Yakoumakis himself, Ilania Abileah, ANTHE, Ian J. Burkett. Guest artists participating are Ray Wilkins, Lefteris Yakoumakis, Vasilis Selimas, and Nickos Delijannis.

In parallel with the show, the new book by Odysseus Yakoumakis will be featured, titled "Leaflets from the Wilderness (a case study about the artscape in nouveau-Greece and many other lands)" ("Ash-In-Art" Publications).

Yakoumakis is currently writing and illustrating two series of fantasy-fiction novels and graphic novels, "The Chronicles of the Archipelago" and "The Chronicles of the West". The first book of the "Chronicles of the Archipelago", titled "The Gift of Cannon", is expected to be published by "Ash-In-Art" Publications in September 2010.

The launch of the book will be combined with a show of its major illustration panels, which have been implemented by Yakoumakis as paintings, at the "Ash-In-Art" Gallery, Athens, Greece.

English and Italian publications of all the above-mentioned books will be attempted from 2011 onward.

== See also ==
- The Romantic Anonymous Fellowship
- Stuckism
- Remodernism
- The Stuckists Punk Victorian

== Bibliography ==
- Odysseus Yakoumakis, "A Romantic & Anonymous (nonetheless signed) Critique of Post Modernism"
- Odysseus Yakoumakis, "The Romantic Anonymous Manifesto"
- Odysseus Yakoumakis, "The Academic Provincialism of contemporary Greek Art and its proposed Stuckist remedy"
- Milner, Frank ed. (2004), "The Stuckists Punk Victorian" National Museums Liverpool, ISBN 1-902700-27-9
