= Dale Hickey =

Australian artist

Dale Hickey (born 1937) is an Australian artist.

Born in Melbourne, Hickey studied art at Swinburne College of Technology and then held various teaching positions including Senior Lecturer in painting at Phillip Institute of Technology (now Royal Melbourne Institute of Technology) from 1973 to 1989, before devoting himself full-time to painting. His first solo exhibition was at Toorak Galleries, Melbourne, in 1964. In 1968 he was included in the National Gallery of Victoria exhibition of Australian minimalism, The Field, together with Robert Hunter, Robert Jacks, Peter Booth, and Robert Rooney. Hickey has described this early work as being inspired by American critic Clement Greenberg and by pop art. His later work has explored a wide range of styles, constituting, according to critic Christopher Heathcote, "a sustained investigation into the nature of art." He is represented in all major public collections in Australia.

== See also ==
- Australian art
