= Phillip Institute of Technology =

Phillip Institute of Technology (PIT) was a tertiary college in northern Melbourne, from 6 January 1982 to 30 June 1992 at which time the school integrated as part of RMIT University. The college's buildings formed RMIT's Bundoora Campus (now Bundoora West Campus) and Coburg Campus. Coburg Campus was closed in 1997, with the site since serving as a series of secondary and primary schools.

The Preston Technical School was established on St Georges Road in the Australian suburb of Preston, in 1937. The school was later renamed Preston Technical College, then Preston Institute of Technology (PIT). In 1964, PIT began issuing diplomas, and by the end of the 1960s, it offered diplomas in the Arts, Commerce, Business, and Engineering. In 1973, the diploma component of the Institute moved to part of the Bundoora Police Paddock, closing its engineering faculty. The trade qualification portion of the school remained in Preston, and is now a major part of Melbourne Polytechnic. PIT was well-known as an art school in the 1970s and 1980s.

In 1959, the Coburg Teachers' College was established, on a section of the site for the Pentridge Prison farm, offering diploma training for Primary Education Teachers. This college become the State College of Victoria at Coburg in 1973, with expansion of its instructional offerings to include other welfare-related diplomas. In 1978, it began to deliver a Bachelor of Education degree.

Phillip Institute of Technology was created on 6 January 1982, as an amalgamation of the State College of Victoria at Coburg and the Preston Institute of Technology in Bundoora.

PIT was the first Australian educational institution to offer training at Undergraduate and Postgraduate levels for youth workers and professionals, engaged in Youth Affairs Administration and Policy Development.

Concetta Benn, an Australian social worker, was head of the school of Social Work from 1982–1983.

In 1987, PIT became self-accrediting. It was amalgamated into RMIT University on July 1, 1992. The Institute produced 14,156 graduates during its 10-year existence.

Further details and history can be found in the book, A decade of achievement: Phillip Institute of Technology, in which author Brian Carroll outlines the history of the Institution, between 1982 and 1992.
