= Robert Rooney =

Australian artist and art critic

- Born: 24 September 1937; Melbourne, Australia
- Died: 21 March 2017 (aged 79)
- Known for: Conceptual art, Painting, Photography

Robert Rooney (1937–2017) was an artist and art critic from Melbourne, Australia, and a leading figure in Australian Conceptual art.

== Biography ==
Born in Melbourne on 24 September 1937, Rooney lived in Northcote until December 1939 when he moved to Broomfield Road, East Hawthorn. He trained at Swinburne College of Technology, Melbourne from 1954 to 1957, then at Preston Institute of Technology (Phillip Institute), between 1972 and 1973. His early work was hard-edged abstraction based on cereal packets, knitting patterns and suburban design for which, by the early 1960s, he had become well known. He gained national recognition with his inclusion in the seminal exhibition of colour field painting The Field exhibited at the National Gallery of Victoria, Melbourne and Art Gallery of New South Wales in 1968.

From 1969 to 1981 Rooney turned his attention to systematic photographic observation in a conceptual art mode, prior to which, from 1954 to 1963 he had used a Box Brownie camera to take photographs as references for his paintings, drawings and prints. Rooney, who stopped taking the serial photographs in 1975, said ‘I don’t particularly like photographer’s photographs.’. After this period he returned to painting In 1982 with ‘The Red Card, Australia’, 1944—45’ based on a Communist Party membership card he found in a book 20 years earlier. He continued plays on such printed ephemera, and it was included by Paul Taylor in Popism, a major exhibition at the NGV of Post-Pop art.

Rooney wrote extensively on Australian art as critic for the Melbourne Age (1980-July 1982) and as Melbourne Art Critic for The Australian (October 1982–99). He died on 21 March 2017.

== Selected exhibitions ==
- 2013 Robert Rooney, the Box Brownie Years 1956–58, Centre for Contemporary Photography, Melbourne.
- 2012 Play, National Gallery of Australia, Canberra.
- 2010 Endless Present: Robert Rooney and Conceptual Art, National Gallery of Victoria, Melbourne. Retrospective with context provided by art donated from his collection of local and international conceptual art contemporary to the time.
- 2009 Cubism and Australian Art, Heide Museum of Modern Art, Melbourne.
- 1990 The Readymade Boomerang: Certain Relations in 20th Century Art, 8th Biennale of Sydney.
- 1971 4 Conceptual Artists: Mel Ramsden, Ian Burn, Joseph Kosuth, Robert Rooney, Pinacotheca, Melbourne, with catalogue by Rooney.
- 1968 The Field, National Gallery of Victoria, Melbourne and Art Gallery of New South Wales in 1968, seminal exhibition introducing international colour field painting into Australia.

Between 12 November 2010 and 27 March 2011, the National Gallery of Victoria held a retrospective of Rooney's work, titled 'Endless Present'.

== Collections ==
Rooney's work is held in a number of state, regional and university collections, including:

- National Gallery of Australia, Canberra
- National Gallery of Victoria, Melbourne
- Art Gallery of New South Wales, Sydney
- Art Gallery of South Australia, Adelaide
- Art Gallery of Western Australia, Perth
- Queensland Art Gallery, Brisbane.

== Bibliography ==
- Allen, T. Cross-Currents in Contemporary Australian Art, Craftsman House, 2001
- Allen, C. Art in Australia: From Colonization to Postmodernism’, Thames and Hudson, 1997
- Allen, C. Conceptual Ascetic, Review, Weekend Australian, 5–6 February 2011
- Allen, F. Portraits of an artist, The Herald-Sun, 7 March 2001
- Barlow, G; Delaney, M; & McFarlane, K. (Eds.) Change – Monash University Museum of Art, Pub. MUMA, Melbourn 2010, p. 151
- Burt, W. Thirty Years of Australian Experimental Music 1963–1993, Sounds Australian: Journal of Australian Music, Autumn 1993
- Butler, R. A Secret History of Australian Art, Craftsman House, 2002
- Campbell, J. Wide-Eyed: Melbourne, the US and Back Again, interview with Robert Rooney, John Campbell's Greatest Hits Vol. 1 (catalogue) Glen Eira City Gallery, 1999
- Catalano, G. Building a Picture: Interviews with Australian Artists, McGraw-Hill, Australia, 1997
- Catalano, G. Who's the Artist? Gary Catalano interview with Robert Rooney, Art Monthly Australia, June 1994
- Catalano, G. Rooney retrospective reveals the enigma of a straight-shooter, The Age, 7 November 1990
- Clabburn, A. Bizarreness seen as if for the first time, The Australian, 19 February 2001
- Clement, T. Robert Rooney: Balletomania Australian Art Collector, Issue 37 – July – September 2006. p. 255
- Colquhoun, B. The Lure of Light, interview with Robert Rooney, Art and Australia, 39/2, 2001
- Crawford, A. Acquisitions in Australian Art Collector, Issue 47 – January–March 2009, pp. 134–135
- Creagh, S. Open Gallery Sydney Morning Herald Spectrum 26–27 August 2006, p. 16
- Crombie, I & Blainey, G. Sites of the Imagination: Contemporary Photographers View Melbourne and its People, National Gallery of Victoria, 1992
- Duncan, J. From the Homefront: Robert Rooney: Works 1953–1988, catalogue, Monash University Gallery, 1990
- Engberg, J. Downtown: Ruscha, Rooney, Arkley, catalogue, Museum of Modern Art at Heide, 1995
- Ferber, S., Healy, C. & McAuliffe, C. (ed). Beasts of Suburbia, Melbourne University Press, 1994
- Flynn, P. Endless Present, Artist Profile, issue 14, 2011
- Gennochio, B. (ed.). The Art of Persuasion: Australian Art Criticism 1950–2001, Craftsman House, 2003
- Gennochio, B. Accenting the Minimal, Weekend Australian, 1–2 February 2003
- Gibson, J. Los Melbos, Art & Text 51, 1995
- Gollings, J. & Mchell, G. New Australian Style, Thames & Hudson, 1999
- Grishin, S. Australian Identities in Printmaking: The Print Collection of the Wagga Wagga Regional Art Gallery, Wagga Wagga Regional Art Gallery, NSW, 2000
- Green, C. & Smith, J. (curators). Fieldwork: Australian Art 1968–2002, catalogue, Ian Potter Centre: NGV, Australia, 2002
- Green, C. Have a Nice Day Mr. Rooney, Art/Text 66, 1999
- Green, C. Pinacotheca, Art and Australia, 34:4, 1997
- Green, C. Downtown: Arkley, Rooney, Ruscha, Artforum, November 1995
- Green, C. Robert Rooney, Art & Text 47, January 1994
- Grey, A. (ed). Australian Art in the National Gallery of Australia, National Gallery of Australia, 2002
- Harding L, Cramer, S, Cubism and Australian Art, Heide Museum of Modern Art, Melbourne, 2010
- Hartigan, P., Robert Rooney's out of the ordinary photography, That Saturday Paper, September 27, 2014 http://www.thesaturdaypaper.com.au/2014/09/27/robert-rooneys-out-the-ordinary-photography/14117400001026#.VC9ZrvmSxPc
- Hay, A. (ed.). The perfect Week, The Bulletin, 20 February 2001
- Heathcote, C. Manhattan to Bloomsbury, Art Monthly Australia, Dec/Jan 1990/1991
- Heathcote, C. What do artists look forward to after the retrospective, The Age, 13 November 1991
- Heathcote, C. Visual art speaks where words fail, The Age, 8 October 1993
- Holt, S. & Murray, J. Luna Park and the Art of Mass Delirium, catalogue, Museum of Modern Art at Heide, 1998–1999
- Holt, S. Just for Fun: Images of Luna Park and St Kilda, Art and Australia, 34:4, 1997
- Hutchinson, N. Missing in action, The Sydney Morning Herald, June 16–17, 2001
- James, B. Culture of a dynamic era, The Age, 6 September 1995
- Kidd, C. Give Me Five, Artforce, summer, 1999/2000
- Koop, S. (ed.) A Small History of Photography, Centre for Contemporary Photography, 1997
- Lancashire, R. Painting of the Week: No: 8, What Price Victory? (1983), Robert Rooney’, The Age, 21 May 2002
- Lower, L.A. Robert Rooney, review, The Sydney Morning Herald, 25–26 October 2003
- Lynn, E. Double Vision, The Australian, 17 February 1995
- Makin, J. The way of all flesh, The Herald Sun, 17 June 2002
- Mendelssohn, J. 1968, PRIMAVERA, The Australian, 15 September 1995
- McAuliffe, C. & Yule, P. (eds.). Treasures: Highlights of the Cultural Collections of the University of Melbourne, Miegunyah Press, 2003
- McAuliffe, C. Art and Suburbia, Craftsman House, 1996
- McCulloch, S. Focus on structure: Highlighting our modern past, The Australian Financial Review, 23 March 2006
- McCulloch, S. DOWNTOWN, The Australian, 24 March 1995
- McDonald, K. Contemporary print collecting: Melbourne's print workshops and publishers, Art and Australia, 40:2, 2002
- McDonald, E. & Annear, J (eds.). What is This Thing Called Photography?: Australian Photography 1975-1985, Pluto Press, 2000
- McKenzie, B. & Phipps, J. Artists and wunderkinds, Artlink, 21:2, 2001
- McKenzie, R. Women still firmly in the picture, The Age, 27 December 1995
- McKenzie, R. Downtown: Ruscha, Rooney, Arkley, The Age, 29 March 1995
- Michael, L.. 21st Century Modern: 2006 Adelaide Biennial of Australian Art, catalogue essay, exhibition catalogue, Art Gallery of South Australia, 2006
- Michael, L. The Monash University Collection: People, Places and Ideas: Four Decades of Collection, catalogue, Monash University Museum of Art, 2002
- Moore, C. Museum Hygiene, Photofile, March 1994
- Morrell, T. Post Mortem Ante Facto, Broadsheet Vol. 33 No. 2, pp. 76–77
- Murray Cree, L. & Drury, N (eds.). Australian Painting Now, Craftsman House, 2000
- Nelson, R. Contemporary artists upstaging with understatement, The Age, 4 October 1995
- Nelson, R. Blockbuster to schlockbuster, The Age, 27 December 1995
- Nelson, R. Drawing on child art, The Age, 14 February 2001
- Nelson, R. Imaginative life of children inspires, The Age, 8 June 2002
- Nelson, R. Colouring Modern Life, The Age, 16 December 2003
- Nelson, R. The high art of the routine, The Age, 8 February 2011
- Neville, G. Quirky, offbeat look at the banal, The Age, 26 October 1990
- Nicholson, H. Avant-Gardism for Children, catalogue, University Art Museum, The University of Queensland, 1999
- Palmer, D. The order of things: the edition and the series in contemporary photomedia, Photophile 67, December 2002
- Pestorius, D. Geometric Painting in Australia 1941–1997, catalogue, University Art Museum, The University of Queensland, 1997
- Preston, E. Howard Arkley: Not Just a Suburban Boy, Duffy and Snellgrove, 2002
- Queensland Art Gallery, Queensland Art Gallery: Collection Souvenir, Queensland Art Gallery, 1996
- Reid, B. & Underhill, N. (eds.) Letters to John Reed: Defining Australian Cultural Life 1920–1981, Viking, 2001
- Rhodes, K. The Camera is a Dumb Recording Device; Robert Rooney and the serial photographs in retrospective
- Rogers, J. The Art of Knitting, Angus & Robertson, 1991
- Rooney, R. Robert Rooney, 21st Century Modern: 2006 Adelaide Biennial of Australian Art catalogue essay, exhibition catalogue, Art Gallery of South Australia, 2006
- Simpson, K. Memories are made of this, The Herald Sun, 21 March 1995
- Smith, T. Transformation in Australian Art, Volume Two: The Twentieth Century – Modernism and Aboriginality, Craftsman House, 2002
- Stanhope, Z. The Persistence of Pop: Works from the Monash University Collection, catalogue, Monash University Gallery, 1999
- Thomas, D. Melbourne Modern: The Art of Robert Rooney, Art and Australia, 34:4, 1997
- Tomas, D. Golden oldies: four artists who were new and exciting in the 1960s and early 1970s and are still going strong, Art and Australia, 50:4, 2013
- Tobacco, W. Robert Rooney: Now and Then, Imprint, 37:3, Spring 2002
- Tonkin, S. When visual and performing arts align, Silver lined – Contemporary artists and the Performing Arts Collection exhibition catalogue, The Arts Centre, Melbourne, Australia, 2008
- Virgo, A. Australia: Limited Edition Prints, catalogue, The 16th Asian International Art Exhibition, Australian Print Workshop, 2001
- Wadelton, D. From ‘Red Rattlers’ to Lara Croft, Interview with Robert Rooney, Art and Australia, 38/2, 2000
- Whiteoak, J. & Scott-Maxwell, A. (eds.). Currency Companion to Music and Dance in Australia, Currency House, 2003
- Whiteoak, J. Playing ad Lib: Improvisatory Music in Australia 1836–1970, Currency Press, 1999
- Whiteoak, J. Melbourne Leads the Revolution, La Trobe Bulletin, September 1994
- Zimmer, J. From the Homefront: Robert Rooney 1953–88, Art and Australia, 28:4, 1991
- Zimmer, J. In an Artist's Obsessive Zone, The Herald, 11 November 1990
