= Peter Booth (painter) =

Australian artist

- Born: 2 November 1940 (age 86); Sheffield, United Kingdom
- Education: in the National Gallery School, Melbourne
- Known for: Painting

Peter Booth (born 2 November 1940) is an Australian figurative and a surrealist painter, and one of the key late-20th-century Australian artists. His work is characterised by an intense emotional power of often dark narratives, and esoteric symbolism.

== Life ==
Booth was born the son of a doctor of metallurgy, and the industrial surrounds of Sheffield and its history of being bombed in the Second World War influenced him from an early age. He and his family migrated to Australia in 1958, where he worked as a labourer for several years before attending the National Gallery School in Melbourne. After making his reputation as an abstract painter, in the 1980s he turned to figuration, often that of horrifying dreams and nightmares. The evocative power of some paintings allows viewers to almost feel the emotions of the central figure. This resonates with the artist's dream-based works, as many are inspired by his own dreamscapes. The connection to the subconscious further strengthens the argument for categorizing him as a surrealist painter.

== Work ==
Booth's subject matter largely concerns the Australian landscape, both urban and rural, and the relationship between environment and individual. The individual's capacity to create and destroy is another theme, along with visions of the future of humanity.

His figuration works have tended to be horrifying and surreal, exploring the half remembered world of dreams. Such dreams do not come out of nowhere, but reflect on primal feeling buried in consciousness.

Booth's landscapes are charged with emotion and symbolic meaning. Memories of his childhood in the blackened industrial landscape of Sheffield seem to infuse the work, especially his well-known apocalyptic figurative paintings, which resemble images of the end of the world. These images contain an intense image of anxiety and dread, evoking the aftermath of some terrible destruction, vividly pictured in menacing forms with agitated and heavily applied brushstrokes.

An example of this is Painting 1978 which has been described as challenging and disturbing the viewer by the artist's choice of colour and method of painting. "The dramatic black and red, yellow and white composition suggests both an industrial and a natural wasteland". The heavy impasto paint texture describes, with vigour and intensity, flames, explosions, and unidentified nightmarish images. Contradictory forces pull us into the central inferno below the glacial mountain peaks, and showers of rock explode towards us.

Is it the artist himself who stands with his back to us, mesmerised by the scene, while grotesque metamorphosing figures stare out at us?" Peter Booth has centred many of his paintings around his childhood in Sheffield England where he grew up during the war years and their aftermath.

A major retrospective exhibition of Peter Booth's work was held at the Ian Potter Centre: National Gallery of Victoria during November 2003 to February 2004.

A retrospective exhibition displaying the evolution of themes in Booth's career is being held at the TarraWarra Museum of Art until 13 March 2023. It includes several comparison prints with artists such as William Blake, Francisco Goya, James Ensor and Samuel Palmer to reveal similarities with Booth's work.
