= Laurence Le Guay =

Australian photographer (1916–1990)

Laurence Craddock Le Guay (25 December 1916 – 2 February 1990), was an Australian fashion photographer.

== Biography ==
Laurence Craddock Le Guay was born on 25 December 1916 at Chatswood Sydney, of locally born parents Charles Sidney Le Guay, company secretary, and Doris Alma Le Guay, née Usher.

== Photography ==
Le Guay's schoolboy hobby of photography was encouraged by Harold Cazneaux and from 1935, at age eighteen, he worked as an assistant at Dayne portrait studio, before opening his own studio in Martin Place in 1937, to concentrate on illustrative and fashion photography. He joined the Pictorialist Sydney Camera Circle in 1940 and exhibited with them at various national and international photographic salons. He began producing photomontage work of a more Surrealist style around the contemporary theme of the Machine Age and incorporating the heroic nude, most significant being The Progenitors (1938). Many of these became illustrations in the newly founded Man: The Australian magazine for men. Consequently, in November 1938 he was invited by Max Dupain and Olive Cotton to join them in forming The Contemporary Camera Groupe with others including Douglas Annand, Harold Cazneaux, Damien Parer, Cecil Bostock and Russell Roberts. The Groupe proclaimed themselves as Modernist, seceding from Pictorialism, and the youngest members were, like Le Guay, commercial photographers. They were inspired by a new image of the body, Australian in that it referred to sun-worshipping beach culture, health and vitality.

== War service and later fashion photography ==
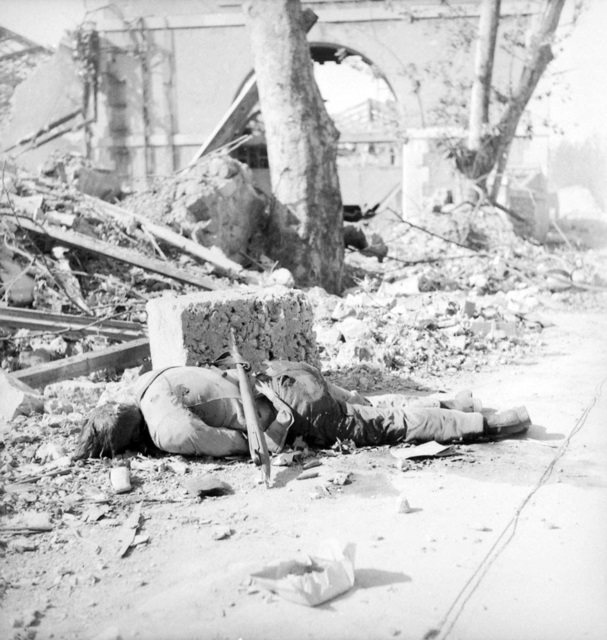
One of Le Guay's photographies on Toulon, after its battle.

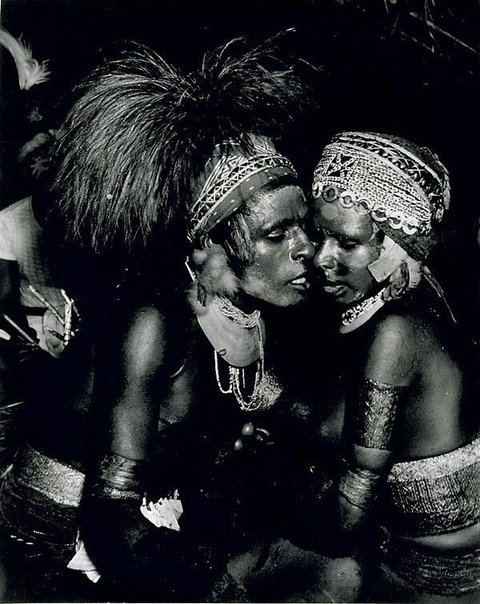
Laurence Le Guay (c. 1945) Kanana ceremony New Guinea, included in The Family of Man world-touring exhibition

Le Guay enlisted with the Royal Australian Air Force in 1940, serving as a photographer in the Mediterranean (1941–43) and the Middle East (1943–45). Demobilised in Sydney in January 1946, he accompanied artist Robert Emerson Curtis as photographer on the Australian Geographical Society's tour of Northern Australia, and joined other expeditions, to New Guinea, and the Australian National Antarctic Research Expedition. One photograph he shot in New Guinea was included by Edward Steichen in The Family of Man exhibition in New York in 1955, which toured the world to reach the largest audience of any photographic exhibition since. He, and David Moore, were the only Australian photographers whose work was included in the exhibition.

Le Guay founded Contemporary Photography, the first Australian photographic magazine not published by a photo supply firm, the first issue of which appeared in December 1946. Through it he promoted modernism, abstraction and documentary approaches as an antidote to the Pictorialist style which still predominated in Australia, and which he began to react against during his membership (1940–1953) of the increasingly conservative Sydney Camera Circle. He also taught photography.

He set up a new studio that year in George Street, then in the old Smith's Weekly building, moving, in 1947, to a partnership with John Nisbett on Castlereagh Street. They were among the first in Australia to use outdoor locations for fashion photography. In 1947–48, he produced a film on Sydney Harbour Bridge.

Le Guay continued to be a significant international, and Sydney's leading, fashion photographer throughout the 50s and 60s, rivalling Athol Shmith in Melbourne. Helen Ennis notes that "The sixties look achieved by Athol Shmith in Melbourne and also by Laurence Le Guay in Sydney had another crucial component the models themselves and the way they related to the camera. These young women exert a different kind of presence to their predecessors." The Le Guay/Nisbett studio was joined in 1961 by David Mist. Born in London, Mist trained and worked in the UK, so augmented his partners' acquired European élan, and further enlivened the burgeoning local industry.

== Contributions to the profession ==
Though Le Guay's magazine Contemporary Photography folded in 1950 due to his busyness, he continued his interest in writing, editing Australian Photography magazine from 1956 and the annuals published by it; Australian Photography 76 (1977) and Australian Photography - a contemporary view (1978), having closed his studio on Castlereagh Street, Sydney in 1970. With the younger David Moore, for whom he was a mentor, he was a founder of the Australian Centre for Photography in Sydney in 1974. He continued giving lectures, and also took up deepwater sailing.

In 1963 Le Guay was awarded the Commonwealth Medal for his contributions to the profession as photographer, editor, lecturer and member of professional organisations.

He died on 2 February 1990 survived by Ann Warmington, whom he had married 22 July 1948 and divorced in 1967, and one daughter.

== Publications ==
- Le Guay, Laurence (1949). A Portfolio of Australian photography. H.J. Edwards, Sydney
- Le Guay, Laurence & Slessor, Kenneth, 1901-1971 (1966). Sydney Harbour. Angus & Robertson, Sydney
- Le Guay, Laurence & Falkiner, Suzanne (1980). Australian Aborigines : Shadows in a landscape (1st ed). Globe Publishing, Sydney
- Le Guay, Laurence (1975). Sailing free : around the world with a blue water Australian. Ure Smith, Sydney
- Le Guay, Laurence (1976). Australian photography 1976. Globe, Sydney
- Le Guay, Laurence (1978). Australian photography : a contemporary view. J. H. Coleman, Globe Publishing, Sydney
