= Stump (surname) =

Stump is a surname. It is commonly found as an Anglicized version of the German names 'Stumpf', 'Stumph', and other variations. Notable people with the surname include:

- Al Stump (1916–1995), American author and sports writer
- Alfred Stump (1860–1925), Australian photographer
- Bob Stump (1927–2003), American congressman
- Carl Stumpf (1848–1936), German philosopher
- Cinderella G. Stump, occasional pseudonym of Jo Stafford
- Claude Stump (1891–1971) Australian embryologist, son of Alfred
- Eleonore Stump (born 1947), American philosopher
- Felix Stump (1894–1972), American navy officer
- Henry Stump (died 1865), American judge from Maryland
- Herman Stump (1837–1917), American politician from Maryland
- Horst Stump (1944–2018), Romanian boxer
- J. Henry Stump (1880–1849), American politician from Pennsylvania
- Patrick Stump (born 1984), American singer-songwriter, of rock band Fall Out Boy
- Samuel John Stump (1779–1863), English painter
- Silvia Stump (born 1953), Swiss alpine skier
