= David Beal (photographer) =

Australian photojournalist

- Born: May 24, 1936 (age 90); Pinner, Middlesex, England
- Education: Salvatorian College, Harrow Weald; St Bede's College, Mentone
- Occupations: photojournalist, portraitist
- Employer(s): The News; Pix; Woman's Day'; TV Week; The Sydney Morning Herald; The Bulletin; Life; Time; The Observer; Paris Match; Playboy; The Sunday Times Magazine; Vogue; Walkabout
- Agent: Black Star
- Known for: Beal, David; Horne, Donald (1967). Southern exposure. Collins.
- Style: Humanist photography
- Parents: Kenneth Gordon John Beal (father); Lillian (née Waller) (mother)

David Beal (24 May 1936) is a British-born Australian photojournalist and multimedia producer, active from 1956–1990s.

== Early life ==
David Beal was born in Pinner, Middlesex, England on 24 May 1936, the elder brother of Tim (born 1942) and Susan (born 1946). His mother, Lillian Beal (née Waller) grew up in Bethnal Green, London, where her father Tom Waller was a fish monger. Beal's father, Kenneth Gordon John Beal, trained as a pattern maker in the North of England and was enlisted as a soldier in WWII but was discharged due to duodenal ulcer, then served in the Home Guard after the family moved north to Bramhope in Yorkshire, where after the war he was a salesman for machine tools. After primary school in Yorkshire, Beal attended Salvatorian College, in Harrow Weald, London. Around 1947, he adopted photography as a hobby, encouraged by an aunt, who helped him set up a darkroom. At that time the family lived beside the Thames river near Staines.

In late 1951 the family migrated to Australia on the Strathnaver as 'Ten Pound Poms' arriving at Port Adelaide February 1952 before moving to Melbourne where his mother ran two milk bars. There, Beal spent his last school years at St Bede's College, Mentone where he started taking photographs, some of which, of a study tour through Victoria, were published as a double spread in The Catholic Weekly. He took evening classes to study cartography while working as assistant chainman to a surveyor, until the family moved again after his father was appointed manager of a Swedish steel company based in Adelaide, while his mother worked as a ledger machinist for Swallows biscuit company.

== Career ==
In 1968, when he was described as 'bearded, quirky and ambitious,' and 'living in Woollahra with a [fashion] model wife,' Beal defined those ambitions;

"I wasn't interested in photographing fridges...I wanted to do something different...I'm interested in people. I like to make social comments about the situations in which I find them."

Aged 19, Beal was the sole photographer at the rescue of David Hally, also 19, lost for six days in the Victorian Alps. His picture story was purchased for and syndicated by Melbourne's The Sun to the Brisbane Courier-Mail and the Adelaide Advertiser, for which he was paid £150 (worth $A4,000 in 2019) by The Sun,; his first earnings from photography. For the story he used a Mamiya C medium-format twin-lens reflex available in 1956.

The scoop led to employment as a 'C Grade' photographer on Adelaide's The News, for which he covered fires, visiting American celebrities Johnnie Ray and Nat King Cole, rodeos, cloud seeding, crime stories, weddings and accidents using the supplied ¼-plate Speed, or Century, Graphic camera. Soon he switched to 35mm Nikons, starting with a range-finder model.

After losing his job with The News he hitchhiked to Sydney, shooting a story on drug use by long-distance truck drivers on the way, and there began freelancing as a photographer for magazines including Pix, Woman's Day, and for TV Week. He took his folio to The Sydney Morning Herald and was employed by the newspaper in 1960 as an 'A Grade' photographer.

During travel in Indonesia funded by The Sydney Morning Herald he was granted an audience with President Sukarno, to whom he presented a gift of a painting by Australian indigenous artist Winnie Bamara, whom he had photographed in South Australia. He was allowed to interview and photograph him for a story for the newspaper which confirmed Indonesian designs on New Guinea and Papua, and his scoop was also published in Pix. From 1963 Beal freelanced, his photographs appearing regularly in magazines including Walkabout,

When he learned that his future wife Dawn intended to travel to the United Kingdom he resigned from the Herald group, and bought a Land Rover with his brother to drive north from Adelaide. Arriving back in Sydney via Queensland in 1964, he was given an assignment for Time to photograph the first election in Papua New Guinea. He was on a bridge taking pictures of bearers carrying ballot boxes when he was struck by a truck, suffering broken legs. He arrived in London a month or so later via New York and Washington DC with a couple of assignments in hand, one for LIFE magazine which hired him to photograph baseball and the British challenger in the America's Cup in the Isle of Wight. Later that year he spent 18 months in the US and Europe during which he covered Churchill's funeral for Paris Match and provided the illustrations for Men of Auschwitz, a story written by his wife Dawn on war crimes trials for The Sunday Times, London, returning to Australia in 1965. His work featured on the covers of four 1966 The Bulletin issues, which contained his coverage of the filming of The Weird Mob; The Beach; 'Teenagers: the wild ones'; and a feature on Hans Heysen

From 1966, and based in Greece for Black Star agency, his pictures appeared in issues of Life, Time , The Observer magazine, The Daily Telegraph magazine, The Illustrated London News, Paris Match, Playboy, The Sunday Times Magazine, Australian Photography and Vogue. In 1967 he returned to New Guinea to photograph wreckage from the Battle of the Coral Sea, also for Life.

In 1968 Kodak (Australasia) supported the National Gallery of Victoria, which was then in the process of setting up a photography department, to buy photographs by Beal along with those of other photojournalists David Moore, Helmut Gritscher and Lance Nelson.

== Books ==
Beal produced photographs with a critical perspective on Australian provincialism, drinking habits and sun-worship, for the publication Southern Exposure (1967) in collaboration with social commentator and journalist Donald Horne. Of the book, in 2019 Dr Douglas Hassall remarked that;

"It said and showed some sharp and provocative things, which rather belied its “coffee table” format; and it therefore achieved, on a wider front, an overall effect rather as Robin Boyd’s The Australian Ugliness (1960) had done in respect of Australian architecture and design."

Photography historian Martyn Jolly earlier proposed that Robert Goodman and George Johnston’s more upbeat and nationalistic The Australians (1966) and Southern Exposure "can be seen to have been in dialogue with each other" during an earlier ‘photobook boom’ which was a precursor of the shift of photography as an art medium in the 1970s.

After publishing Life in Australia in 1968, the following year for In the Making (1969), Craig McGregor's survey of Australian artists 'in action' with a radical design by Harry Williamson. Beal produced portraits of artists, writers and musician including Ian Fairweather, Ron Robertson-Swann, Patrick White, David Boyd, Sir Roy Grounds, David Aspden, Nigel Butterley, Douglas Stewart and Richard Meale. The photography involved travel all over Australia, with Beal and McGregor taking a boat from Brisbane to Bribie Island, to interview and photograph Ian Fairweather who was living out his last years as a hermit, still painting. On its release the book was negatively reviewed by Canberra journalist Maurice Dunleavy. Since then, the book has come to be regarded as the Australian answer to Antony Armstrong-Jones' survey of British creatives, Private View (1965).

During 1971 David Beal and his wife Dawn collaborated on the production for a children's book series I Want to Be... and that year he was employed by the firm Decor Associates Pty. Ltd. in whom Warren T. Harding and David C. Lorimer were partners, to photograph homes and business premises they had decorated for the publication Australian decor.

== Reputation ==
Beal is accepted as the equal of colleagues David Moore and David Potts alongside whom he worked on several assignments. Stuart Geddes recalls his impression of the relative status of the photographer in the production of In the Making;

"I’d just met Craig McGregor, the writer, and he’d been doing a series of articles for the Herald on designers and artists and architects. We talked about it and he had the idea that he’d like to turn it into a book. He was working with David Beal, who was a really good photographer and I’d worked with him at Vogue, but because the job was so vast, and I was working with David Moore, I said to Craig, “Well, you know, there’s room for two photographers here.” David Beal was quite happy about that, because he and David got on very well."

== Portraits ==
Amongst other personalities Beal photographed were Dick Bently, June Dally, Lorraine Crapp, Dickie Valentine, Rudy Komon, Diana Ward, Russell Drysdale, John Kerr, John Olsen, Stan Ostoja-Kotkowski, Reg Grundy, Col Joye, Diana Trask, Bruce Petty, Kym Bonython, Marian Henderson, Poncie Ponce, Marlon Brando, David Fanshawe, Les Tanner, Peter Powditch, Len French, Sydney Ball, Robert Grieve, Tony Coleing, Sir William Dobell OBE, Winnie Bamara, Jon Molvig, John Brack, Sir Hans Heysen OBE, Gary Shead, David Aspden, Clifton Pugh, and dress designers Norma Tullo and Hall Ludlow.

== Later career ==
In the 1970s Beal founded 'Audience Motivation', an audio-visual company based in Paddington which made use of tape-programmed sound-synchronised multi-image projection technology using 46 mm transparencies in Wess S1 or S2 mounts. The company made novel large scale multiscreen shows for IBM in Hong Kong, Singapore, Tokyo, Manila, Bangkok, Beijing, KL, and Sydney, and similarly for Pacific Asia Travel Association in Bali, Bangkok and HK.

A major client was Richard Johnson architect, then with the Department of Housing and Construction, with whom Beal conceived and produced the opening exhibit in 1988 for the Powerhouse which was a 360º multi image cube titled Creativity and major Expo presentations; an eighty-projector show on five screens presenting 'The Australian way of life' for the Australian Pavilions at Expo 82 Knoxville Tennessee; Expo 84 in New Orleans; Expo 85 Tsukuba; Expo 92 in Seville; and the Australia Post pavilion at Expo 88 in Brisbane for which 100 computer-controlled projectors were used.

Though by the late 1980s the audio-visual medium was being gradually superseded by video and data presentations, Audience Motivation continued to garner major commissions; in the middle 1990s Beal photographed in China for major mttli-screen AVs that Audience Motivation produced for a number of major corporate conventions staged in Beijing, requiring the shipping of 3 tonnes of audiovisual equipment.

Beal's role in advancing the careers of Australian creatives was significant, as Audience Motivation employed scriptwriter Barry Wills, multimedia experts Bruce Brown, and producer/director of worldwide events Andrew Walsh and incorporated the work of a number of Australian photographers, including Philip Quirk of ‘Wildlight’, Stuart Owen Fox, David Robert Austen and Richard Woldendorp.

== Publications ==
- Beal, David; Horne, Donald (1967). Southern exposure. Collins. OCLC 1706332.
- McGregor, Craig; McGregor, Craig, 1933-; Beal, David, 1936- (1968), Life in Australia, Southern Cross International
- McGregor, Craig; McGregor, Craig, 1933- (1969), In the making, Thomas Nelson (Australia), ISBN 978-0-17-001819-7
- Beal, Dawn; Beal, David, 1936- (1971), I want to be an airline pilot, T. Nelson, ISBN 978-0-17-002915-5
- Beal, Dawn; Beal, David, 1936- (1971), I want to be an artist, Thomas Nelson (Australia), ISBN 978-0-17-002914-8
- Beal, Dawn; Beal, David, 1936- (1971), I want to be a ferry boat captain, Thomas Nelson (Australia), ISBN 978-0-17-002913-1
- Beal, Dawn; Beal, David, 1936- (1971), I want to be a vet, Thomas Nelson (Australia), ISBN 978-0-17-002911-7
- Beal, Dawn; Beal, David, 1936- (1971), I want to be a model, Thomas Nelson (Australia), ISBN 978-0-17-002912-4
- Beal, Dawn; Beal, David, 1936- (1971), I want to be an airline hostess, Thomas Nelson (Australia)
- Harding, Warren T; Lorimer, David C.; Beal, David, 1936-, (illus.) (1971), Australian decor, Nelson, ISBN 978-0-17-001913-2

== Collections ==
- National Library of Australia
- National Gallery of Victoria
- State Library of New South Wales
- Museum of Applied Arts, Sydney

== Awards ==
- 1963: Frank Hurley Memorial Landscape Prize, highly commended.
