= James S. Stening =

Australian photographer

James Sydney Stening
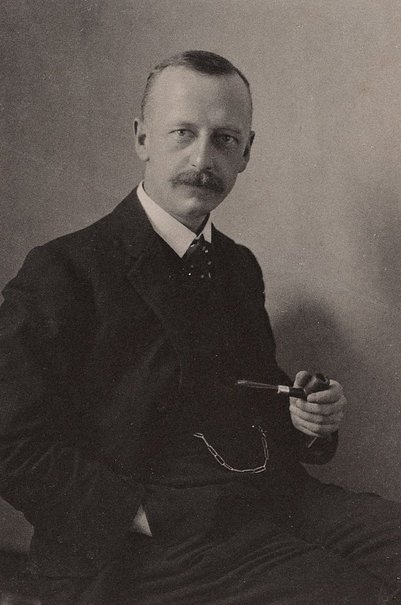
- Portrait of Stening by Harold Cazneaux
- Born: 1870; Sydney, New South Wales, Australia
- Died: 16 September 1953 (aged 82–83)

James Sydney Stening was an Australian photographer who was born in 1870 in Sydney. He was then later trained to be a jeweller. Stening's first employment was with Fairfax and Roberts Jewellers, which he decided to stay with until retirement in his older age. He died on 16 September 1953.

== Photography ==
In the early 1890s Stening started practising photography. A few years later in 1894, he was one of the founding members of the Photographic Society of New South Wales, then later in 1916 he became involved with the Sydney Camera Circle. Also, in 1909, Stening assisted Harold Cazneaux with him arguably making Cazneaux's first exhibition possible. Stening also was involved with the Ashfield District Camera Club which consisted of his friends Norman Deck, Henri Mallard and Frank Hurley. His style of photography was focused on finely detailed landscapes which he gained inspiration from off Norman Deck, with a liking more to the tones of platinum printing papers. Stening occasionally delved into impressionistic soft-focus photographs printed on bromide paper. In an exhibition in 1907 at the Art Gallery of NSW which included Stening's work, one of the comments made by the reviewer was ‘what wonderful strides have been made in the art of the camera, when manipulated by an artist, and how closely the modern photographer is getting to pure pictorial representation’ 1920, he chose to leave all photographic societies. Despite this, Stening took on new technology in the form of a 35mm Leica camera which was released in 1925, continuing his photography practise for some time after this. The Art Gallery of New South Wales later received a donation of his negatives from Norman Deck.

== Collections ==
Stening's work is featured in the National Gallery of Australia, and also in the Art Gallery of New South Wales.

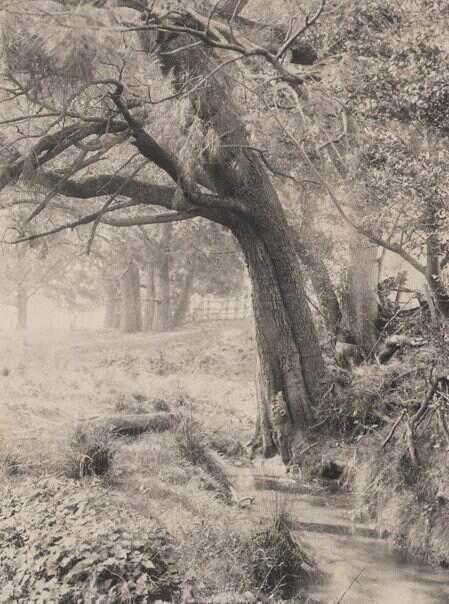
On the Edge of the Common - James S Stening circa 1900

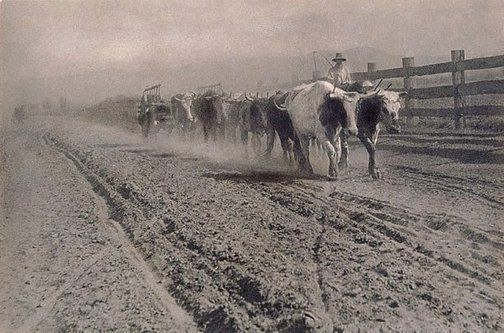
Droving Cattle - James S Stening circa 1903-1910

== Exhibitions ==
- Shortening Shadows, Bracken Time, Born to Toil, Days Work Nearly Done and The Edge of the Common featured in an exhibition by The Photographic Society of New South Wales in 1903.
- The Stock Route, The Pioneer, A Summer Fantasy, White Sails, The King's Highway, The Turpentines, Harvesting the Golden Grain, Eucalypts, Morning, Bringing Them In, E'en Shades, and Born to Toil featured in an exhibition by The Photographic Society of New South Wales in 1917.
- The Stock Route, and A Summer Fantasy were featured in an exhibition by The Photographic Society of New South Wales in 1922.
- The Edge of The Common was featured in the S.H. Ervin Gallery in Sydney from 12 June 1979 to 8 July 1979, The Victorian College of the Arts Gallery in Southbank from 8 August 1979 to 31 August 1979, Art Gallery of South Australia in Adelaide from 1 December 1979 to 30 January 1980, and in Soft Shadows and Sharp Lines: Australian photography from Cazneaux to Dupain, Art Gallery of New South Wales in Sydney from 30 September 2002 to 17 November 2002.
- Untitled (Treescape) was featured in the S.H. Ervin Gallery in Sydney from 12 June 1979 to 8 July 1979, The Victorian College of the Arts Gallery in Southbank from 8 August 1979 to 31 August 1979, and in the Art Gallery of South Australia in Adelaide from 1 December 1979 to 30 January 1980.
