= Malvern, South Australia =

Malvern
- Suburb
- Interactive map of Malvern
- Coordinates: 34°57′26″S 138°36′53″E
- Country: Australia
- State: South Australia
- City: Adelaide
- LGA: City of Unley
- Location: 4 km (2.5 mi) south of Adelaide

Government
  - State electorate: Unley
  - Federal division: Adelaide
- Elevation: 63 m (207 ft)

Population
  - Total: 2,713 (SAL 2021)
- Postcode: 5061
Suburbs around Malvern
Hyde Park	Unley	Parkside
Unley Park	Malvern	Highgate
Hawthorn	Kingswood	Urrbrae

Malvern (/mælvərn/) is an inner-southern suburb of Adelaide in the City of Unley. It borders the suburbs of Unley and Parkside to the north, Highgate to the east, Kingswood to the south and Unley Park to the west.

Many Malvern streets are planted with jacaranda trees, a non-native evergreen species, giving a shady aspect to the area in conjunction with the predominant architectural style of single-storey colonial villas.

Many of its streets are named after places in the United Kingdom, including Dover, Sheffield, and Cambridge.

== History ==
Malvern was initially subdivided for residential development in 1881. In 1884, William Shierlaw and Thomas Matters laid out the Malvern Extension subdivision, followed by South Malvern in 1886. Shierlaw also donated the site for the Malvern Methodist Church, later known as Malvern Uniting Church.

== Notable people ==
- Howard Walter Florey, Baron Florey who received the Nobel Prize in Physiology or Medicine in 1945 for his co-discovery of penicillin, was born in Malvern in 1898.
- Arnold Hatherleigh Matters, operatic baritone and producer, born in Malvern
- Photographer Alfred Stump lived on Austral Terrace with his family, including his son, Claude Stump.

== See also ==
- List of Adelaide suburbs
