= David Moore (Australian photographer) =

Australian photojournalist (1927–2003)

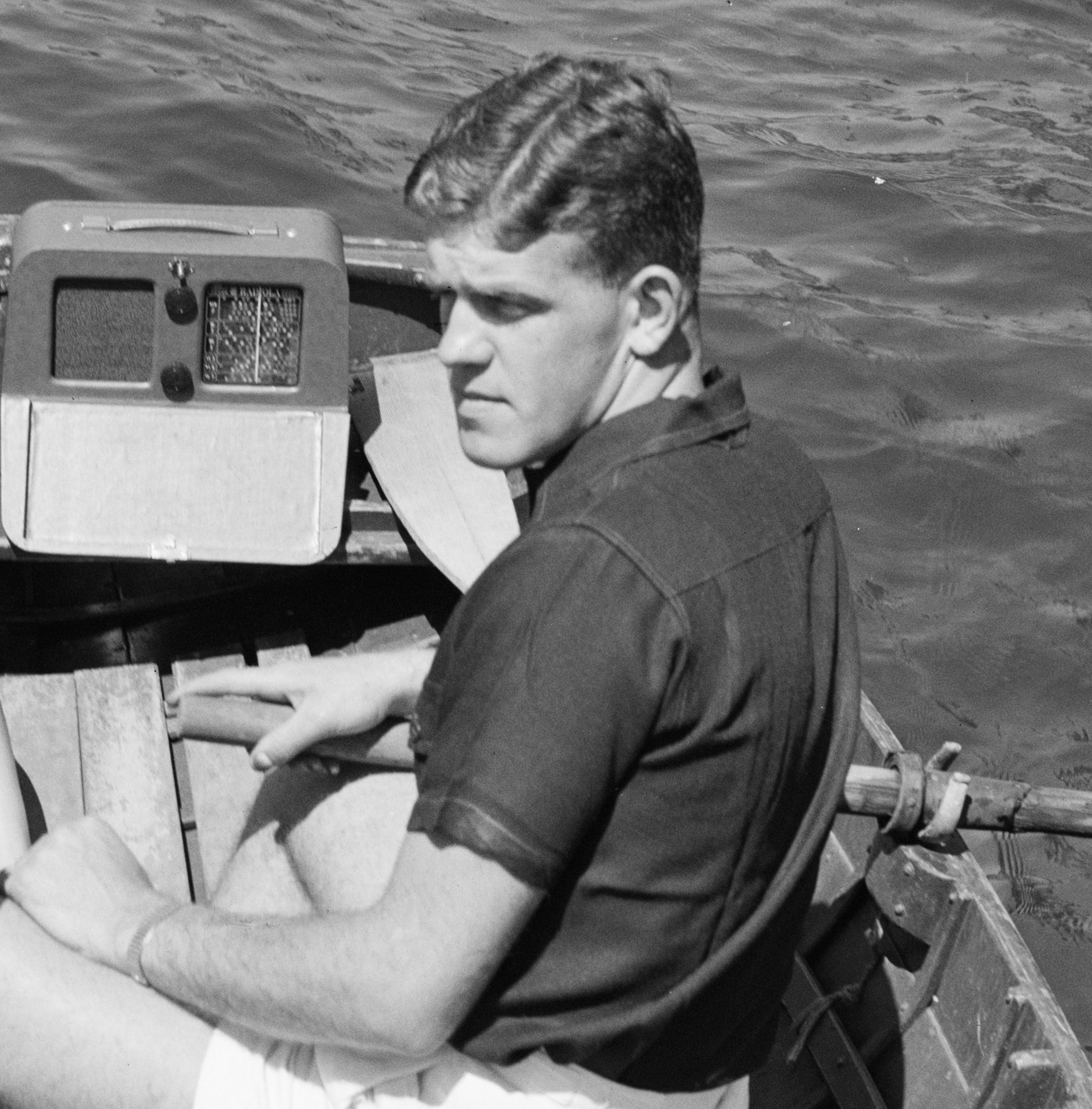
- David Moore, Sydney, ca. 1953
- Born: April 6, 1927; Vaucluse, Australia
- Died: January 23, 2003 (aged 75); Longueville, New South Wales
- Occupation: Photographer
- Known for: photojournalism, historian of Australian photography, initiator of the Australian Centre for Photography.

David Moore (6 April 1927 – 23 January 2003) was an Australian photojournalist, historian of Australian photography, and initiator of the Australian Centre for Photography.

== Early life and education ==
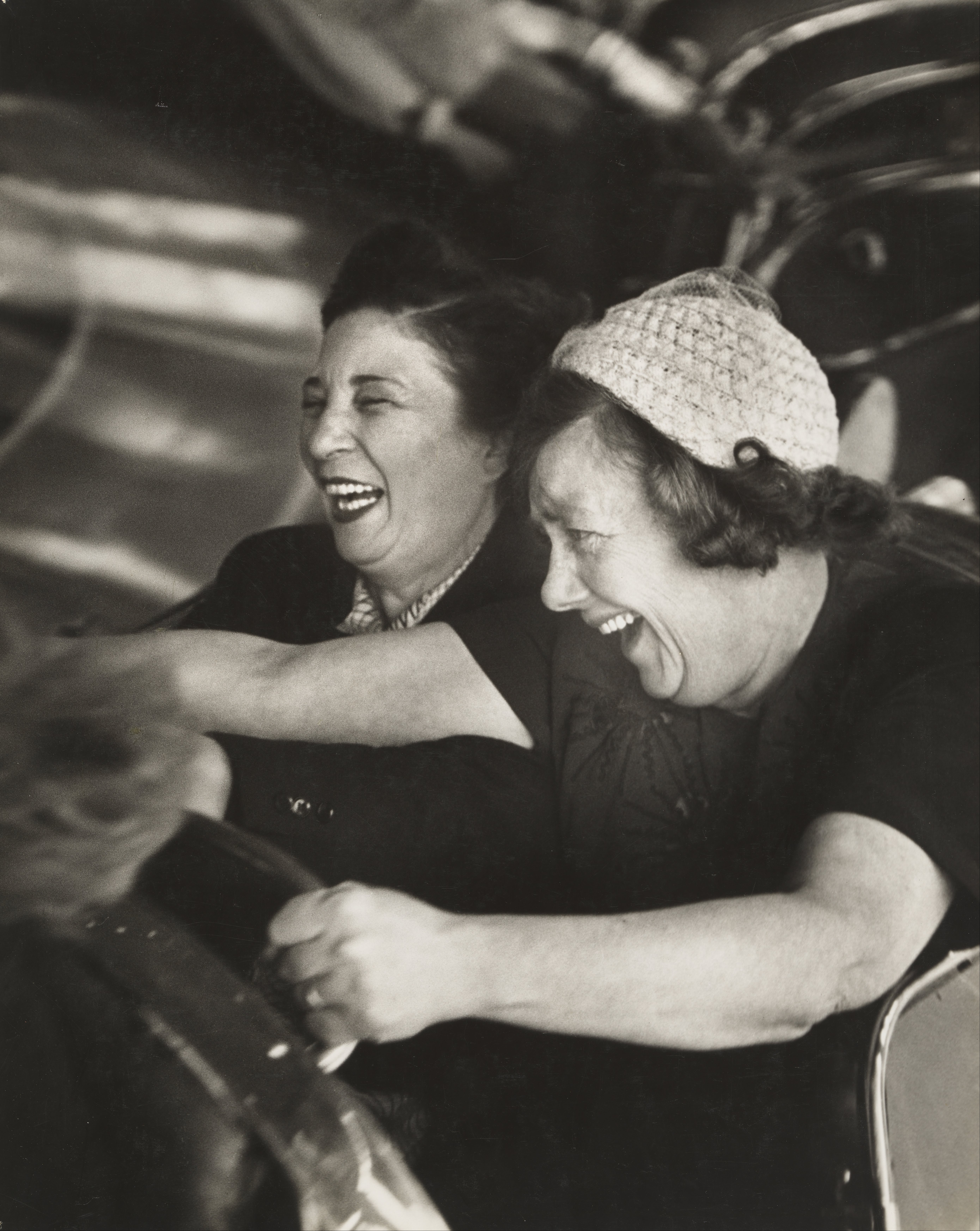
David Moore Battersea Fun Fair, London (1951)

Moore was born in Vaucluse, Sydney, Australia, the younger brother of Tony, the two children of Casiphia Dorothy (née Morton) who died in 1931, and architect and artist John D. Moore who on 23 June 1932 married their step-mother, the artist Gladys Mary (née Owen) OBE at St Michael's Anglican Church, Vaucluse.

Moore was educated (1933–39) at Tudor House primary school when, at age 11, he was given a Coronet box camera, before graduating to Kodak 1A folding camera, given to him by his father who inspired his son's interest in the medium when he brought home a book on the work of Edward Weston. With it he photographed a fellow student and future Prime Minister, Malcolm Fraser, sailing a toy yacht and as an illustration in the school's The Tudorian it was his first published work. He also used it to make a self-portrait aged 15, while undertaking his secondary studies at Geelong Grammar School 1939-1945.

During World War II Moore served in the Royal Australian Navy.

== Career ==
In 1947, having begun studies in architecture, Moore decided on a photography career, which he began in the advertising and illustration studio of Russell Roberts in Sydney. He joined the Institute of Photographic Illustrators formed in Sydney in 1947 as 'the first group of specialised cameramen [sic: Margaret Michaelis was the only woman member] to be organised as a society in this country'. Moore was amongst fifteen exhibitors, mostly Sydney professionals, in the first exhibition in 1949. He moved on to work with Max Dupain, whose work he respected as "clean...very informative, very strong, very emotional – a world away from the soggy pictorial stuff." Working in Dupain's studio from 1948 until 1951 on architectural, commercial and industrial assignments, in his own time Moore made excursions to photograph the foreshores, harbour and city of Sydney, as well as making pictures its slums, on which Harold Cazneaux commented in Contemporary Photography, in the course of which he made the much-reproduced Redfern interior, of a family facing eviction. Moore's work started being exhibited and published, in 1948 when he was 21, with a double page spread in a 1950 Sunday supplement of the Sydney Morning Herald being devoted to his series on the preparation of an ocean liner for its return journey to the UK, and inclusion in a book Australian Photography.

Despite being offered a junior partnership with Dupain, Moore moved to London in 1951, where commissioned work appeared in the New York Times, Time, The Observer, Fortune, Life, Look and other publications and undertook commissions in the USA, Europe and in Africa, including accompanying the Royal Tour in Nigeria in 1956. Moore married Jennifer Flintoff in 1955.

The couple returned to Australia on RMS Orion, 2 August 1958, the year of his father's death in December, in time for the opening of a solo exhibition of Moore's work at Macquarie Galleries, He contributed picture stories to local publications including Walkabout, but continued to be commissioned by, and sell existing work to, American and British magazines, represented by the New York-based Black Star photo agency from 1958.

After the birth of twins in August 1960, Moore diversified the commercial applications of his photography; his semi-abstract murals depicting the four elements fire, earth, air and water decorated the dining room in the refurbishment of the Carlton-Rex Hotel in Sydney; and large panels of Moore images were exhibited at the Australian stand at the Comptoir Suisse at the Palais de Beaulieu, in Lausanne, which was attended by an audience of over a million. He joined forces in establishing a studio in a North Shore terrace house at 100 Walker Street with designers Gordon Andrews and Harry Williamson, then at 7 Ridge Street. North Sydney in a building designed and then also occupied by architect Ian McKay. Thus they gained more exposure, sometimes working together on commissions such as the Tokyo Trade Fair, and the 1962 British Empire and Commonwealth Games in Perth, Western Australia. in the estimation of historian Gavin Souter the group "helped change the creative climate in Australia."

== Recognition ==
Moore was early recognised as a significant practitioner. In a 1959 review his Slum Kids is favourably compared with his employer Dupain's Meat Queue in a review of a group show alongside Laurence Le Guay at David Jones Gallery.

Another early image, also made while apprenticed to Dupain, of a struggling family in working class Redfern was included in Edward Steichen's major 1955 exhibition "The Family of Man", which originated at the Museum of Modern Art and toured the world. In a newspaper article Moore corrected the misinformation that he was the only Australian with work in the show–Laurence Le Guay had been miscredited by MoMA as being a New Guinea photographer.

Commentator Craig McGregor regarded Moore as amongst a few who had "made the crucial breakthrough in Australian photography". Photographs by him were purchased, with those of David Beal, Helmut Gritscher, Lance Nelson and Richard Woldendorp in 1969 for the National Gallery of Victoria, Melbourne through the Kodak (Australasia) Pty Ltd Fund. In December a group show of these works was held, the first representation of photography at the new National Gallery of Victoria quarters in St Kilda Road. Moore's 1966 photograph Migrants Arriving in Sydney, originating from a commission by National Geographic, is regarded as an iconic work of modern Australian photography.

== Fine art photography ==
Moore participated in, and judged, photographic exhibitions throughout his career. In the 1970s Moore developed non-commissioned works aimed at capturing what he called "the soft flow of time", as opposed to the "decisive moment" favoured by magazine editors. Much of such work by him was exhibited in commercial galleries.

== Portraiture ==
Throughout his career, Moore made portraits of significant Australians and international personalities, either in formal sittings or more often as part of his reportage, and many as part of his contribution to journalist and provocateur Craig McGregor's 1969 cultural survey In The Making.

In August 2001, Timothy Fairfax and Gordon Darling gave $44,000 to the National Portrait Gallery to purchase works for a substantial holding of Moore portraits, with the remainder donated by the artist himself. Darling said, ‘I have always admired David Moore's work and his ability to capture the moment with his photographs," while Simon Elliot elaborates on "Moore's skill as a portrait photographer and his love of the captured moment, accident and chance, combined with strong formal compositional devices."

Those of subjects held in the Australian National Portrait Gallery include; Peter Nicholson, Nelson Mandela, Henry Figueira, Ivan Carapina, Mick Jagger, Philip Noyce, Judy Davis, André Kertész, Max Dupain, William Dobell, Joshua Smith, Lloyd Rees, Robert Klippel, Yvonne Audette, Colin McCahon, Russell Drysdale, Peter Sculthorpe, Arthur Boyd, Sidney Nolan, Fred Williams, Rudy Komon, Leonard French, Harry Seidler, Marea Gazzard, Les Blakebrough, Hal Porter, Patrick White, Bruce Dawe, Gordon Andrews, Colin Madigan, Robert Hughes, A D Hope, Wes Stacey, President Johnson and Prime Minister Holt at Canberra Airport, Averell Harriman, Robert Menzies, Anthony Eden, Georgi Malenkov, Ed Murrow, John Foster Dulles, Mary McCarthy, John Braine, Gilbert Murray, Lord Goddard, Chris Chataway, Henry Moore, George Johnston, Nicholas Hannen, Athene Seyler, Len Howard, Mick Scully, John Olsen, David Gulpilil, Janet Dawson, Kate Gollings, Allan Snyder, Fred Williams, Robert Helpmann, Dawn Fraser.

== Contributions to the profession ==
Moore promoted his profession and encouraged others, workers and amateurs, through his lectures, including at the YMCA Camera Circle, and his judging of competitions in Australia.

He contributed energetically to research into historical Australian photography, making in 1976 an archive of gelatin silver prints from the collection of Henri Mallard's glass negatives that were published in association with Sun Books in 1978, and from 1979, researching Australian photography for a book Australia, Image of a Nation 1850-1950, that was published in October 1983.

During the 1970s he was an influential figure in the development of art photography, and as a dedicated advocate for the acceptance of photography as a legitimate art form was a driving force, with Wesley Stacey, behind the establishment the Australian Centre for Photography in Sydney.

Moore's works have been acquired for collections of the major public galleries and libraries across Australia, and are in institutions in France, the USA and China.

== Personal life and legacy ==
Moore married West Australian Jennifer Flintoff in 1955 while they were both in London, he freelancing and she teaching in the East End, and they had four children. They divorced in 1968.

Moore died on 23 January 2003 of oesophageal cancer at a private hospital in Longueville, New South Wales, aged 75. A major retrospective of his life and work opened at the National Gallery of Australia two days later, assembled from prints from Seven Years a Stranger donated by Moore in 1983, augmented by a complete set of later prints acquired by the Gallery from Moore's retrospective at the Australian Centre for Photography in Sydney in 1976, and later purchases and gifts from the photographer, and his gift of all the 35mm colour transparencies and monochrome prints for In the Making.

== Awards ==
- 1965 Special Award at the exhibition The World and its People at the New York World Fair
- 1967 five First Prizes at the Pacific Fair, Melbourne
- 1971 First Prize Nikon colour section at the International Photographic Competition (first Australian winner)
- 1979 Commonwealth Prize for services rendered as a professional photographer in Australia
- 1985 First Prize, the Denison Award for Architectural Photography
- 1989 Honorary Fellowship, Australian Institute of Professional Photography
- 1994 Awarded Australian Artists Creative Fellowship (two years)
- 2017 Posthumously inducted into the Australian Media Hall of Fame in recognition of his outstanding contribution to Australian Journalism

== Exhibitions ==
The first retrospective of Moore's work, held in 1977 at the Australian Centre for Photography, Sydney, was acquired by the Australian National Gallery (now renamed the National Gallery of Australia).

=== Solo ===
- 1953 People in Photographs The Architectural Association, London
- 1955 from 24 August, solo show, Macquarie Galleries
- 1958 Seven Years a Stranger, Macquarie Galleries, Sydney
- 1959 Seven Years a Stranger, The Museum of Modern Art Australia, Melbourne
- 1960 from 15 January; David Moore, 80 photographs, Paxton's Gallery, 308 George Street, Sydney
- 1960 from 11 Feb; David Moore photographs, Y.M.C.A. Camera Circle, 325 Pitt Street, Sydney
- 1976 David Moore Photographs, The Photographers’ Gallery, London
- 1976 David Moore Retrospective 1940-76, Australian Centre for Photography, Sydney
- 1976 David Moore Retrospective 1940-76, Brummels Gallery, Melbourne
- 1976 David Moore Retrospective 1940-76, Orange, NSW Festival of Arts
- 1978 David Moore Retrospective 1940-1976, touring New Zealand
- 1977 Australia, Australian Embassy, Paris
- 1980 Photographs by Design, Axiom Gallery, Melbourne
- 1980 Exhibition, Macquarie Galleries, Sydney
- 1983 The Landscape of NSW, New South Wales Parliament House, Sydney
- 1985 Sydney at Mid-Century, AGNSW, Sydney
- 1985 Sydney at Mid-Century, Christine Abrahams Gallery, Melbourne
- 1985 Sydney at Mid-Century, Developed Image, SA
- 1985 The CRA Pilbara Project, touring Asia & Japan
- 1986 Australian Artists 1960-85, Christine Abrahams Gallery, Melbourne
- 1986 Australian Artists 1960-85, The Print Room, Sydney
- 1988 Sydney at Mid-Century, New South Wales House, London
- 1988 The Australian Functional Tradition, Christine Abrahams Gallery
- 1988 David Moore: Fifty Years of Photographs, Retrospective, AGNSW
- 1989 David Moore: Fifty Years of Photographs, regional galleries tour
- 1989 David Moore: Australian Photographer, Australian Embassy, Paris, France
- 1990 David Moore: A Survey 1947-89, Christine Abrahams Gallery, Melbourne
- 1991 David Moore (The Kodak Collection) Puerto Rico; Shenyang, China
- 1993 Queenstown Landscapes, Tasmania, Image Hong Kong 93, Hong Kong
- 1993 Sydney Harbour, State Library of New South Wales
- 1993 Railways, Relics and Romance, Art Gallery of New South Wales, Sydney
- 1995 Concert Works, The Sydney Symphony Orchestra, Sydney Opera House
- 1997 The Unseen Images, AGNSW, Sydney
- 1998 The Unseen Images, Christine Abrahams Gallery, Melbourne
- 1999 State Library of Honolulu
- 1999 Australian Embassy, Washington
- 2001 The Unseen Images, Gold Treasury Museum, Melbourne
- 2003 25 January - 21 April; The spread of time: the photography of David Moore, National Gallery of Australia.
- 2005 Christine Abrahams Gallery, Melbourne
- 2005, June; David Moore: 100 Photographs, State Library of New South Wales, Sydney
- 2006 August; David Moore: A Vision, 1927 – 2003, Monash Gallery of Art, Melbourne; Bendigo Art Gallery; Shepparton Art Gallery; Albury Regional Art Gallery; Gold Coast City Art Gallery; Wollongong City Gallery; Mildura Arts Centre; Port Pirie Regional Gallery; La Trobe Regional Gallery
- 2013-14 David Moore: Capturing the creation of the Sydney Opera House; Customs House, Sydney
- 2014-15 A Feat of Daring – David Moore's tribute to the ANZAC Bridge; Customs House, Sydney

=== Group ===
- 1949 from 28 March; David Jones Gallery, Sydney
- 1952 World Exhibition of Photography Lucerne, Switzerland
- 1955 The Family of Man, MoMA, New York, and world tour
- 1960 18–30 March; David Moore with Laurence Le Guay, John Nisbett, Ray Leighton, Athol Shmith, Helmut Newton, Geoffrey Lee, Max Dupain, David Potts, Blaxland Gallery, Sydney
- 1961 from 23 August; with Max Dupain, Architecture exhibition, opened by Hal Missingham, Blaxland Gallery, Sydney
- 1962 from 13 June; Moore with John Hearder, Clive Kane, Eric Bierre, Bruce Minnett, John Nisbett, Max Dupain, John Leighton, Laurie Le Guay, Rob Hillier, Wendy Clayton. Brian Hart, Geoffrey Lee, Paul Trenoweth, David Mist, Athol Shmith, John Cato and Wolfgang Sievers
- 1963 November; Moore's photographs of her works accompany Maria Gazzard's exhibition of ceramics at Hungry Horse Gallery
- 1969 December; The Perceptive Eye, David Moore, David Beal, Helmut Gritscher, Lance Nelson and Richard Woldendorp, National Gallery of Victoria, Melbourne
- 1967 Photography in the Fine Arts, The Metropolitan Museum, New York.
- 1967 Pacific Photographic Fair, Melbourne.
- 1973 Work in Progress, Brummels Gallery, Melbourne.
- 1975 Recent Australian Photography The Department of Foreign Affairs, Touring Exhibition, South East Asia.
- 1979 The Philip Morris Collection, Hyde Park, Sydney.
- 1980 APIA Photography in the Park, Sydney.

== Collections ==
- Art Gallery of New South Wales, Sydney
- Art Gallery of South Australia, Adelaide
- State Library of New South Wales collection list

== Publications ==
- Hall, Rodney; Moore, David R (1983), Australia, Image of a Nation 1850-1950, Collins, ISBN 978-0-00-216447-4
- Moore, David; McCaughey, Patrick, 1943-, (author.); Christine Abrahams Gallery; Print Room (Gallery) (1986), Australian artists 1960-1985 : a personal selection of photographs by David Moore, [David Moore]
- Moore, David (1988), David Moore, Australian photographer, Chapter & Verse, ISBN 978-0-947322-04-5
- Moore, David; Armidale Development Corporation (1992), Image of New England : Armidale, Walcha, Uralla, Dumaresq and Guyra, Armidale Development Corporation, ISBN 978-0-646-09385-7
- Moore, David; Hall, Rodney, 1935- (1993), Sydney Harbour, McMahons Point, NSW Chapter & Verse, ISBN 978-0-947322-09-0
- Moore, David; Ashton, Chris; Newton, Gael. Train of thoughts; Milliken, Robert, 1946-. Heat and sparks (1995), Railways, relics and romance : the Eveleigh Railway Workshops, Sydney, New South Wales (Limited ed.), Caroline Simpson, ISBN 978-0-9596232-2-2
- Moore, David; Imhoff, Robert; Cato Design, Inc (1995), The Australian photographers collection 1, Craftsman House, ISBN 978-976-641-068-1
- Moore, David; Renew, Robert, 1948-; Waldron, Murray (1996), To build a bridge : Glebe Island, Sydney, Australia, Chapter & Verse, ISBN 978-0-947322-10-6
- Moore, David; Annear, Judy; Art Gallery of New South Wales (1997), David Moore, the unseen images : an exhibition at the Art Gallery of New South Wales, Chapter Verse, ISBN 978-0-947322-18-2
- Moore, David; Hamersley Iron Pty. Ltd; Lawrence Wilson Art Gallery (1998), A photographic journey : David Moore in the Pilbara : presented by Hamersley Iron, Lawrence Wilson Art Gallery, the University of Western Australia 6 November 1998 to 31 January 1999, The Gallery
- Moore, David (2000). Fifty Photographs. Introduction by David Marr. Sydney: Chapter & Verse.
- — (Summer 2000). "Growing up". Granta. 70. Photographs introduced by David Malouf: 105–131.
- Moore, David; Thomas, Daniel, 1931-; National Portrait Gallery (Australia) (2000), From face to face : portraits, Chapter & Verse, ISBN 978-0-947322-21-2
- Moore, David; Moore, Lisa, David Moore Photography -date=2008, David Moore Photography

=== Books with photographs by David Moore ===
- Ziegler, Oswald L. (Oswald Leopold), 1900-1984 (1948), Australian photography 1947, Ziegler Gotham Publications
- Spencer, Gwen Morton; Ure-Smith, Sam, 1922-2013; Slessor, Kenneth, 1901-1971; Dupain, Max, 1911-1992 (1950), Portrait of Sydney : a photographic impression with an illuminating article by Kenneth Slessor, U. Smith
- The face of life, M. Parrish, 1959
- MacInnes, Colin (1964), Australia and New Zealand, Time, inc
- Time-Life Books; Time-Life Books (1967), Photography year, Time-Life Books, ISSN 0090-4406
- McGregor, Craig; McGregor, Craig, 1933-; Beal, David, 1936- (1968), Life in Australia, Southern Cross International
- National Geographic Society (U.S.). Special Publications Division (1968), Vanishing peoples of the earth, National Geographic Society
- McGregor, Craig (1969), In the making, Thomas Nelson (Australia), ISBN 978-0-17-001819-7
- 1969 «The US Overseas» c/o Time-Life Books.
- Gray, Allen G, (ed.); Australian Photographic Society (1970), Camera in Australia., Reed, for the Australian Photographic Society, ISBN 978-0-589-07070-0
- Maurice Shadbolt; Ruhen, Olaf, joint author; National Geographic Society (U.S.). Special Publications Division (1971), Isles of the South Pacific ([2d ed.] ed.), Washington National Geographic Society, ISBN 978-0-87044-049-6
- McKay, Ian (Ian David) (1972), Living & partly living : housing in Australia, Thomas Nelson (Australia), ISBN 978-0-17-001908-8
- Howe, Graham; Howe, Graham, 1950-; Australian Centre for Photography (1974), New photography Australia : a selective survey, Australian Centre for Photography, ISBN 978-0-909339-00-5
- Le Guay, Laurence; Le Guay, Laurence, (editor.) (1976), Australian photography. 1976, Globe Publishing Co, ISBN 978-0-9597359-0-1
- Fields, Jack; Moore, David, 1927-2003, (joint author.) (1977), Finland creates : the inter-relationship of land and design in Finland, Gummerus, ISBN 978-951-20-1299-2

=== Publications about ===
- Moore, David; Thomas, Daniel, 1931-; Dupain, Max, 1911-1992 (1980), David Moore, Richmond Hill Press, ISBN 978-0-908157-05-1
- Moore, David; Jones, Jonah; McDonald, John, 1961-; Australia. Embassy (France) (1989), David Moore : photographe australien, Chapter & Verse
- Moore, David; Auckland City Art Gallery; Australian Centre for Photography (1977), David Moore : retrospective exhibition 1940-1976, Auckland City Art Gallery
