= Gritscher =

Gritscher is a surname. It may refer to:

- Helmut Gritscher, Austria-born Australian photographer
- Grigori Gritscher (1893–1945), Soviet Jewish Ukrainian film director
