= Hammer & Co. =

Australian photography studio

Hammer & Co. was an Adelaide, South Australia, photographic business with a studio on Rundle Street.

== History ==
William Henry Hammer (c. 1845 – 12 January 1919) was born in St Austell, Cornwall. In 1880 he emigrated to South Australia, where in the capital city Adelaide he established a photographic studio in 172 Rundle Street, opposite the York Hotel. Hammer's wife (Emily Goldsworthy Hammer) and children arrived later, but before 1882.

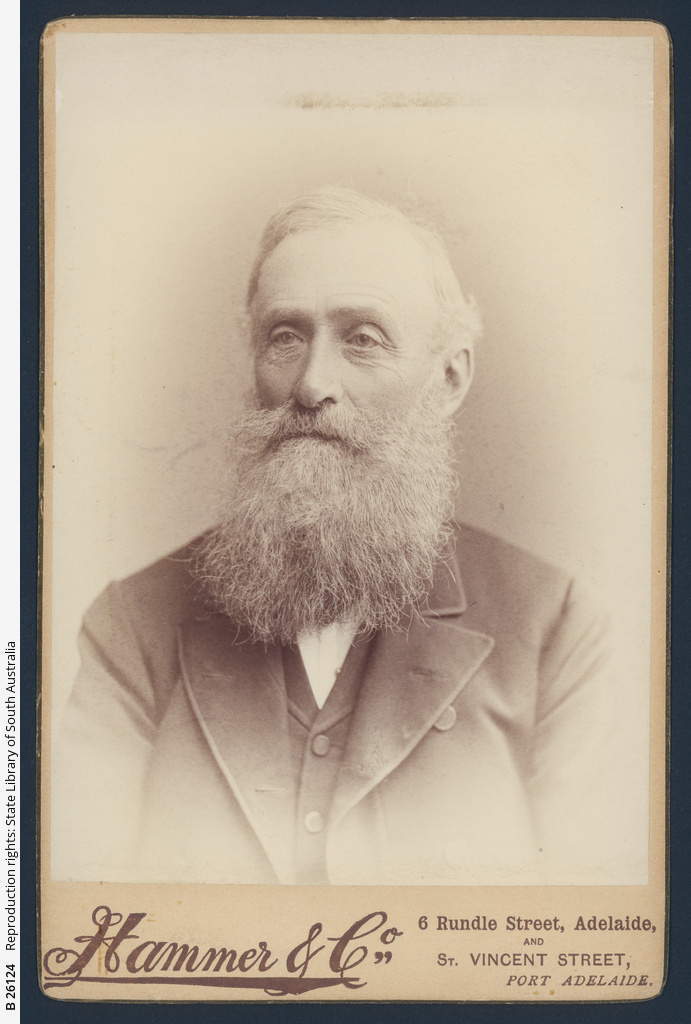
Photograph by Hammer & Co. of Edgar Smith Wigg, founder of Wigg & Son Co. Taken around 1885.

The business prospered, and in October 1885 they moved to larger premises at 6 Rundle Street, near King William and Hindley streets, which were, at the time, the city's major business strips.

Adelaide newspapers regularly used W. H. Hammer photographs, particularly in their society pages, The Critic more than most. Hammer & Co. later advertised themselves as "Vice-regal photographers".

In England, Hammer was known as a musician, organist and choir conductor, but in Adelaide he devoted his energies to the photography business, with considerable success. His other interests were in real estate speculation, local government — he was mayor of St Peters council 1891–1892 — and the Cornish Association, of which he became president in 1910.

In December 1893 representatives of Adelaide's major photographic studios — Hammer & Co., Stump & Co., Duryea, Fritz, Adcock, Scott Barry, Spence, Bond & Co., and Mora, met to discuss ways of standardizing charges, as price competition was affecting the viability of their businesses. A legally-enforceable scale of charges was drawn up, with penalties for noncompliance.

Around 1912, the businesses of Hammer & Co., Stump & Co., and Mora Studios combined to form Studios, Ltd. to operate their businesses, with Alfred A. Stump as managing director, a position he held until his death.

Hammer's son, also named William Henry Hammer, was educated at Prince Alfred College before joining Hammer & Co., later becoming managing director and, on the death of his father, chairman of directors of Studios, Limited, but, ten years later, he died in Melbourne, where he was proprietor of the La Fayette studio, 231 Collins Street. A bachelor, he was a well-read man, a founding member of the St Peters Model Parliament, a prominent member of the Modern Pickwick Club and Melbourne Savage Club. His remains were buried at the Payneham Cemetery.

The business was still operating at 6 Rundle Street, adjacent the Beehive Corner, in the 1960s.

China painter Maida Wright used Hammer's studio to display her work and hold exhibitions.

== Employees ==
Pierce Mott Cazneau was a longtime employee; his son Harold Cazneaux worked for Hammer & Co. from 1896 to 1904, when he left for Sydney and lasting fame.

== Family ==
William Henry Hammer ( – 12 January 1919) married Emily Goldsworthy Penwarden ( – 14 June 1930), a daughter of Rev. T. C. Penwarden, sometime around 1870. They had a home on Wellington Road, Payneham; in later years lived at "Llandower", 121 Kensington Road, Norwood. Their family included:

- William Henry Hammer jun. (1871 – 31 December 1929) inherited the business, never married, died at St Kilda, Melbourne.
- Ralph "Bert" Hammer ( – 1964) of "Aroha" 96 First Avenue, St Peters, married Carmen Cazneau ( – 1966) in 1905

- Ralph Cazneau (later Cazneaux) Hammer (18 March 1914 – 1975) married Jean Violet (or Violet Jean) Hill, lived in Whyalla.
- Carmen Cazneau Hammer (21 August 1922 – 1977) married Anthony John Phillips on 24 February 1950

- Fannie Hammer ( – 1953) married William Richard Males (died 1959), of Kensington road, Norwood on 7 May 1907
- Miss N. Hammer
- Mabel Hammer ( – c. 22 January 1952)
- Ethel Hammer ( – 1954) married William Russell Hambidge (died 1958), of Kensington road, Toorak on 1 November 1910

William Henry Hammer had a brother John Hammer (7 March 1841 – 8 November 1929), secretary of the East End Market. who trained as a carpenter, and emigrated by the Morning Star, reaching Port Adelaide in February 1863. He was married to Arabella Hammer (c. 1844 – 25 December 1920) and had a home at 5 Dequetteville Terrace, Kent Town. Their family included:

- John George Hammer (c. 1870 – 26 April 1954) married Ada Emma (died 1957) in 1895.

- William Hodson Hammer 472/533 ( – 23 August 1924)
- Lawrence Penwarden Hammer (1902 – 17 June 1954)

- Harry Rouse Hammer (c. 1874 – 6 October 1928) succeeded his father as secretary of the Market.

== See also ==
Other major photographic studios in colonial Adelaide were:

- Stump & Co.
- Townsend Duryea
- Adelaide Photographic Co.

In the pre-Kodak days, when photography was the province of professionals and wealthy amateurs, photographic studios were commonplace, and many families visited one such, on occasion, for formal family or individual portraits. Some well-known studios in Adelaide before WWII were:

- W. P. Boase, Hutt Street
- Bourne & Walker, Bentham Street.
- Crown Studio, 143 Rundle street.
- Davies Gray Studio. King William street.
- Dickinson-Monteath Studios, 7a King William street.
- Gainsborough Studio, 41 Rundle street.
- Mayfair Studio, 59 Rundle street
- McNeill Studio, Gawler place:
- Mora Studios, 49a Rundle street
- Paramount Studio, 55 King William Street
- Raeburn Studios, Edment's Building, 66 Rundle Street
