= Henri Mallard =

Australian photographer (1884–1967)

Henri Marie Joseph Mallard
- Portrait of photographer Henri Mallard made in 1916 by Monte Luke
- Born: Henri Marie Joseph Mallard; 9 February 1884; Australia
- Died: 21 January 1967 (aged 82); Balmain, Sydney
- Education: self-taught
- Known for: Photography
- Notable work: Nearing their journey's end (1920s); Break-o-day, railway siding, (1939)
- Movement: Pictorialism, Modernism
- Spouse: Hilda Mary Cousins

Henri Marie Joseph Mallard (9 February 1884 – 21 January 1967) was an Australian photographer.

Born in Balmain (Sydney, Australia) to French parents, he came to photography via the industry. Using his French connections and accent (which was strong owing to his home education), he secured a position in 1900 with Harrington (later Kodak Pty Ltd) as a sales representative to the French consulate. He remained with the company, becoming general manager, until 1952. With ready access to equipment and materials, he was an enthusiastic amateur exhibitor by 1904.

== In the photographic community ==
He used his business and connections to support other photographers; he was influential on fellow Sydney-sider Frank Hurley, encouraging the budding photographer's interest in the medium and, in 1911, recommending Hurley for the position of official photographer to Douglas Mawson's Australasian Antarctic expedition, ahead of himself.; moving to Harrington's Melbourne office in 1913, he opened the showrooms to exhibitions, including that of John Kauffmann in 1914.

He was a strong advocate for art photography; on his return to Sydney (1916), he joined (in 1917) The Sydney Camera Circle, whose "manifesto" had been drawn up and signed on 28 November 1916 by the founding group of six photographers; Harold Cazneaux, Cecil Bostock, James Stening, W.S. White, Malcolm McKinnon and James Paton. They pledged "to work and to advance pictorial photography and to show our own Australia in terms of sunlight rather than those of greyness and dismal shadows". He also contributed lectures and technical demonstrations to the New South Wales Photographic Society.

== Sydney Harbour Bridge ==
He is best known for documenting the Australian icon Sydney Harbour Bridge between the late 1920s and the early 1930s. Photographing from precarious vantage points on the bridge itself, sometimes a hundred metres above Sydney Harbour, his work sets the construction against the harbour and the growing city and uses the figures of the workers to represent the scale of this Depression-era engineering feat. His pictures and film of the Bridge were an intentional historical document, and the project was self-generated. Between 1930 and 1932, he produced hundreds of stills and film footage.

Prior to his project to document the Bridge, Mallard worked in the Pictorialist style prevailing in the New South Wales Photographic Society, and though Modernist in composition and design, many of the Bridge images are printed in bromoil. By comparison, Harold Cazneaux's contemporaneous photographs, taken from around the base of the bridge, retain a romantic Pictorialism.

== Recognition ==
In 1976, the Australian Centre for Photography commissioned David Moore (1927–2003) to make an archive of gelatin silver prints from the collection of Mallard's glass negatives, which were published in association with Sun Books in 1978.

"Here we have the documentary photograph, radical enough in its context, the social document, a large slice of Sydney's evolution and an example to all of us who think of future generations in terms of historical narration." Max Dupain

== Bibliography ==
- Cato, Jack (1955). The story of the camera in Australia(Deluxe ed). Georgian House, Melbourne, p. 156.
- Helen Ennis "Intersections: Photography, History and the National Library of Australia", Canberra : National Library of Australia, 2004. ISBN 0-642-10792-0
- Henri Mallard (photographer); introduced by Max Dupain and Howard Tanner."Building the Sydney Harbour Bridge". Melbourne : Sun Books in association with Australian Centre for Photography, 1976. ISBN 0-7251-0232-2
- Gael Newton. "Australian pictorial photography : a survey of art photography from 1898 to 1938 organised by the Art Gallery of New South Wales, Sydney" Sydney : Trustees of the Art Gallery of New South Wales, 1979. (ISBN 0724017151)
- Gael Newton; with essays by Helen Ennis and Chris Long and assistance from Isobel Crombie and Kate Davidson. "Shades of light : photography and Australia 1839–1988" Canberra : Australian National Gallery : Collins Australia, 1988. (ISBN 0732224055 (Collins Australia : pbk.))
- Gael Newton "Silver and Grey: fifty years of Australian photography 1900 – 1950", Sydney: Angus and Robertson, 1980.
