= The Sydney Camera Circle =

The Sydney Camera Circle was a Pictorialist photographic society formed in 1916 in Sydney, Australia. It was most active before World War II, and was influential on Australian photography for fifty years.

== History ==
The Sydney Camera Circle was formed on 28 November 1916 at the Bostock-Little Studio, Phillip Street, Sydney. The founders were Cecil Bostock, Harold Cazneaux, Malcolm McKinnon, James Paton, James S. Stening and William Stewart White. All six signed a manifesto, pledging to advance and promote a Pictorialist photography devoted to Australian sunlight and shadow as opposed to the greys and ‘dismal’ shadows of European styles. In this ambition they shared the ideals of the Heidelberg School of Australian painters. The group was dominated by amateurs interested in photography as an art form who shared constructive criticism and support at their meetings, exhibiting their work under the name of The Sydney Camera Circle.

The group continued as an entity until 1978 when membership was dwindling in competition with that of the Australian Photographic Society and the Camera Club of Sydney.

== Membership ==
The membership of the Sydney Camera Circle was predominantly male and rarely was there more than one woman member at a time, with the first woman admitted probably being Florence Milson. Dates show period of membership:

- R.G. Allman (May 1921)
- Dr Michael L. Armstrong (October 1970–1971)
- William Barrett (1918–1922)
- H. Bedggood (1924–1928)
- Robert Sidney Beverley (1962–1973) Chairman 1965–1973
- Cecil W. Bostock (1916–December 1935) Foundation Member
- R.E. Donald Brown (1949–1978) Chairman 1974–1978
- William G. Bucklem (1930s–1940s)
- Eric Keast Burke (1940s–1967)
- Harold Cazneaux (1916–1953) Foundation Member, First President from 1922
- Dr Arthur Ernest Fraser Chaffer (1928–June 1963)
- Nell Chaffer (1963–1978)
- Clifford Stuart Christian (March 1957–June 1967)
- Kenneth Clifford (October 1963–resigned 3 June 1968)
- Dr K. Courtney (12 March 1969–)
- Frank D. Collins (1940–1954)
- Olive Edith Cotton (1939–*)
- Dr Kevin Courtney (1969–1971)
- Q. Davis (?–May 1960)
- Norman C. Deck, Honorary Member (October 1921–1978), Honorary Life Member (August 1972–1978)
- Robert E. Dickinson (1971)
- H.D. Dircks (1940s–1961)
- Arthur Eades (1918–1920)
- Stanley William Eutropoe (1917–1978)
- Arthur William Christopher Ford (1917–1922) Honorary Life Member (February 1964–September 1965)
- D. Fraser (May 1921–1937)
- A.W.W. Gale (October 1940–1969)
- Harold Richard Gazzard (November 1962–August 1976)
- George L. Graves (1966–1971)
- Nell Griffin (1974–1978)
- Laurence Le Guay (1940–1953)
- Charles Haseron (1918–1921)
- Kenneth Dudley Hastings (October 1949–1966)
- E.B. Hawkes (February 1932–July 1936)
- Douglas Raleigh Hill (November 1924–1938)
- James Hoey (February 1956–1978)
- Robert Holcombe (1918–1921)
- Kiichiro Ishida (April 1921–December 1923)
- Cyril V. Jackson (1949–1973)
- Harry Powell James (1935–June 1973)
- Laurence R. James (June 1966–June 1967)
- Harold N. Jones (1928–January 1970)
- Ken Kirkness (1971 -)
- Charles Francis Laseron (1920–November 1921)
- Peter Lawrence (1925–1928)
- Ronald A. Lloyd (Joined 9 August 1967)
- Monte (Charles Robert Montague) Luke (1921–November 1962)
- J.G. McColl Associate Member (April 1923–1931)
- Roy A. MacDonell (April 1971–1973)
- Malcolm McKinnon (1916–1920) Foundation Member
- Henri Mallard (1917–January 1967) Retail Manager–Harringtons Photographic Merchants
- J.G. McColl (1928)
- John William Metcalfe (March 1925–1955)
- Mrs A.G. (Florence) Milson (1920–1921) First ‘Lady’ Member
- William Heath Moffitt (June 1927–1938)
- George James Morris (April 1925–1938) Hon.Secretary 1925–1936
- Robert Nasmyth (1949–March 1972)
- James Paton (1916–1938) Foundation Member
- John L. Phillips (9 August 1967–1978)
- Edgar N. Poole (1917–1932)
- R.D. Roddenby (April 1971–**)
- Richard Vaughton Simpson (1928–1967)
- James S. Stening (1916–1920) Foundation Member
- Aleck Stern (March 1973–1978)
- Sydney Ure Smith, Associate Member, May 1921–1949
- Charles E. Wakeford (1917–March 1965) Honorary Life Member (March 1965–1968)
- Charles F. Walton (1940s–1950s)
- D'Arcy J. Webster (1918–1932)
- William Stewart White (1916–1932) Foundation Member
- John Williams (1971–**)
- Kurt Winkler (October 1973–1978)
- John L. Wray (1950s–1960s)

== Selected exhibitions ==
- 14 to 28 February 1921: at the invitation of Henri Mallard, 115 prints were displayed at the Kodak Salon, Sydney with sales totaling £70.
- February 1921: Scottish Photographic Federation Salon, Dundee included 60 prints from The Sydney Camera Circle.
- July 1921: London Salon shows 9 prints by 8 members of the Circle.
- October 1921: Melbourne Arts and Crafts exhibition shows 50 photographs by the members. Kodak Melbourne shows the work in their windows.
- 1922: Colonial Competition 1922. Sydney Camera Circle takes first place with medals awarded to Henri Mallard and Florence Milson by the Amateur Photographer and Photography.
- 12 June to 8 July 1979: Art Gallery of New South Wales 'Australian Pictorial Photography', S.H. Ervin Gallery, Sydney.
- 14 January to 1 April 1984 Art Gallery of NSW 'The Sydney Camera Circle: The Early Years, 1916 – 1938'.
