= Emily Florence Cazneau =

Australian-born New Zealand artist and photographer

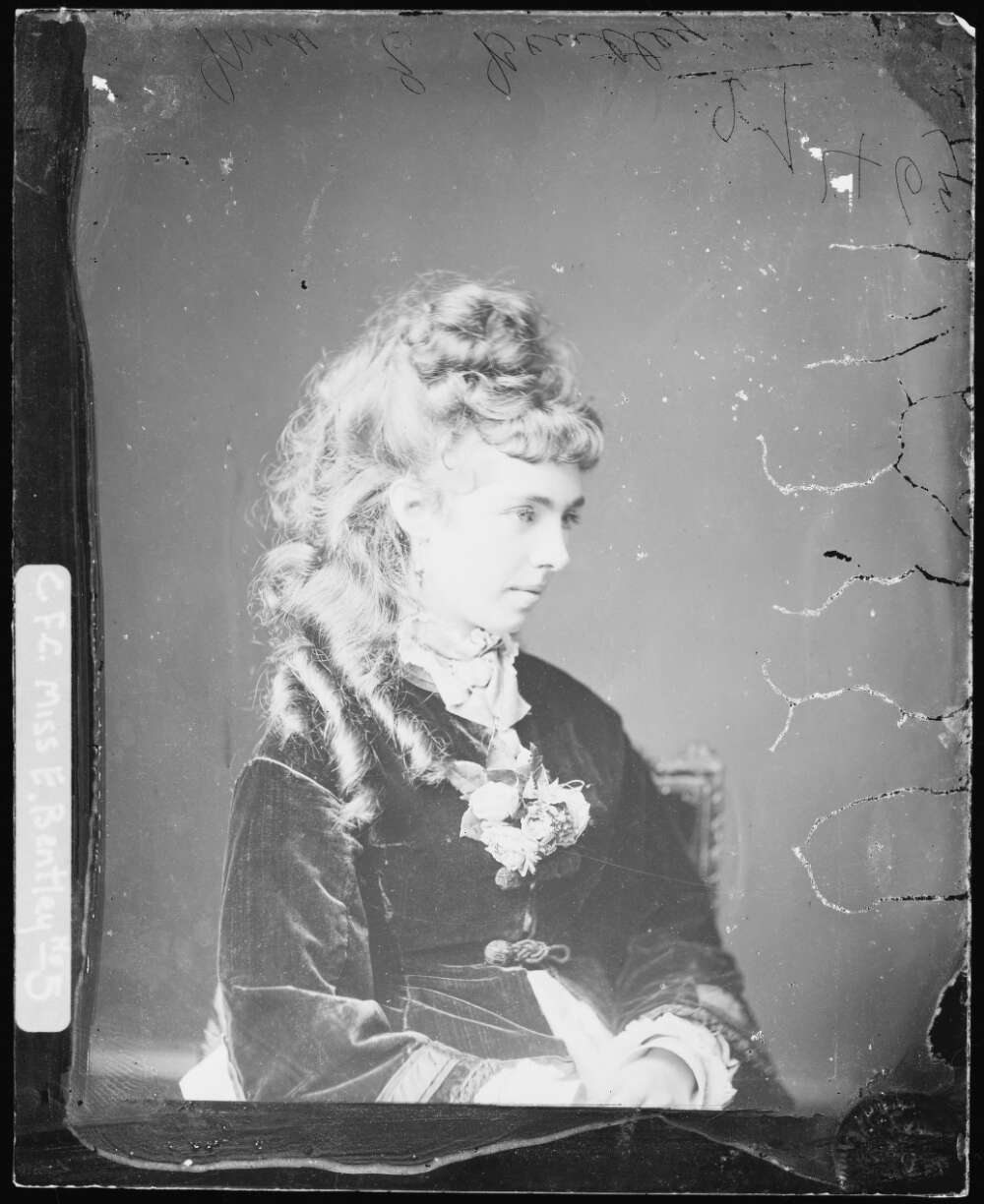
- Born: Emily Florence Bentley c. 1861
- Died: 1892
- Known for: Painting and Photography
- Spouse: Pierce Mott Cazneau

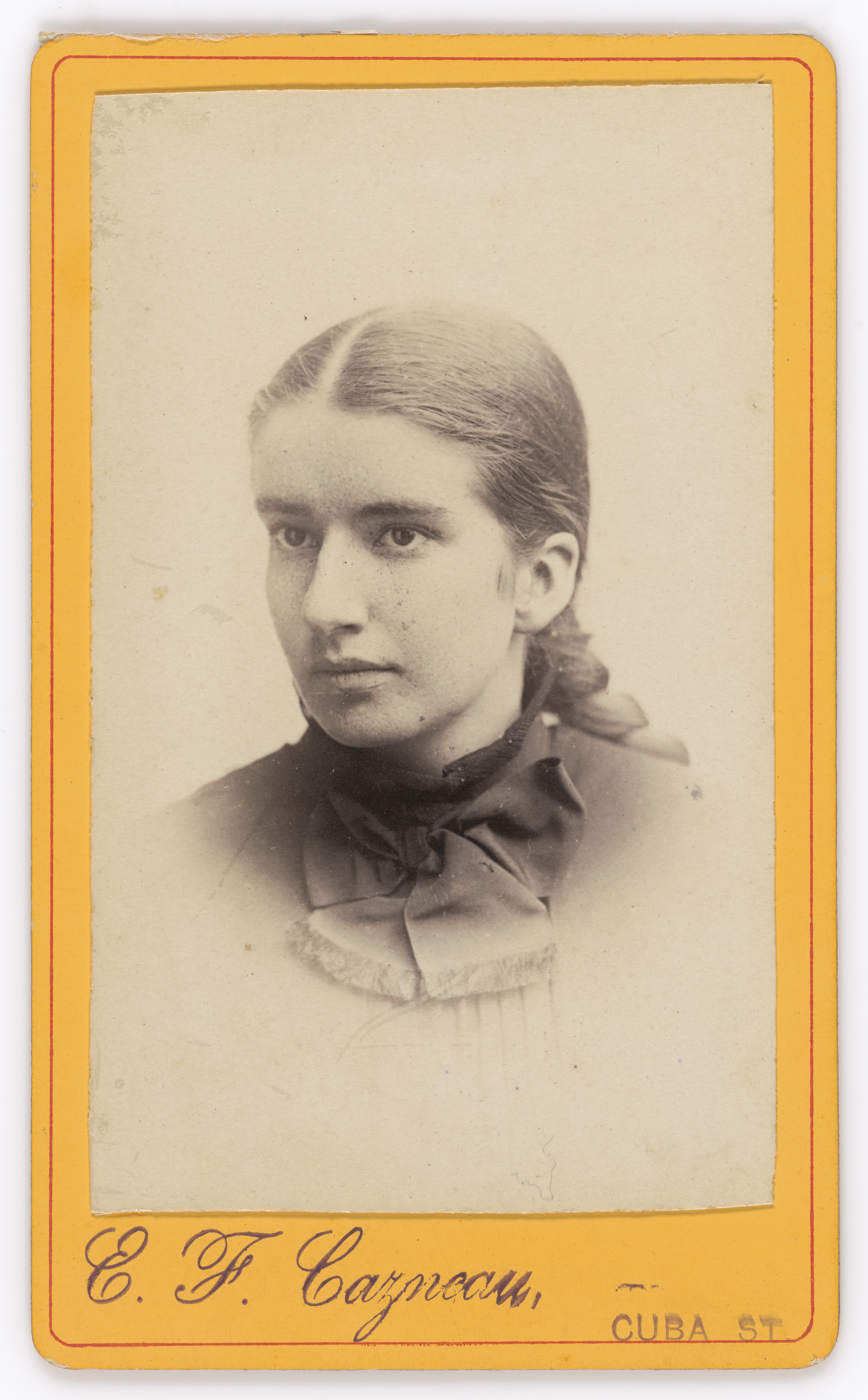
Young woman, circa 1885, Wellington, by Emily Florence Cazneau. Te Papa (O.048930/A-B)

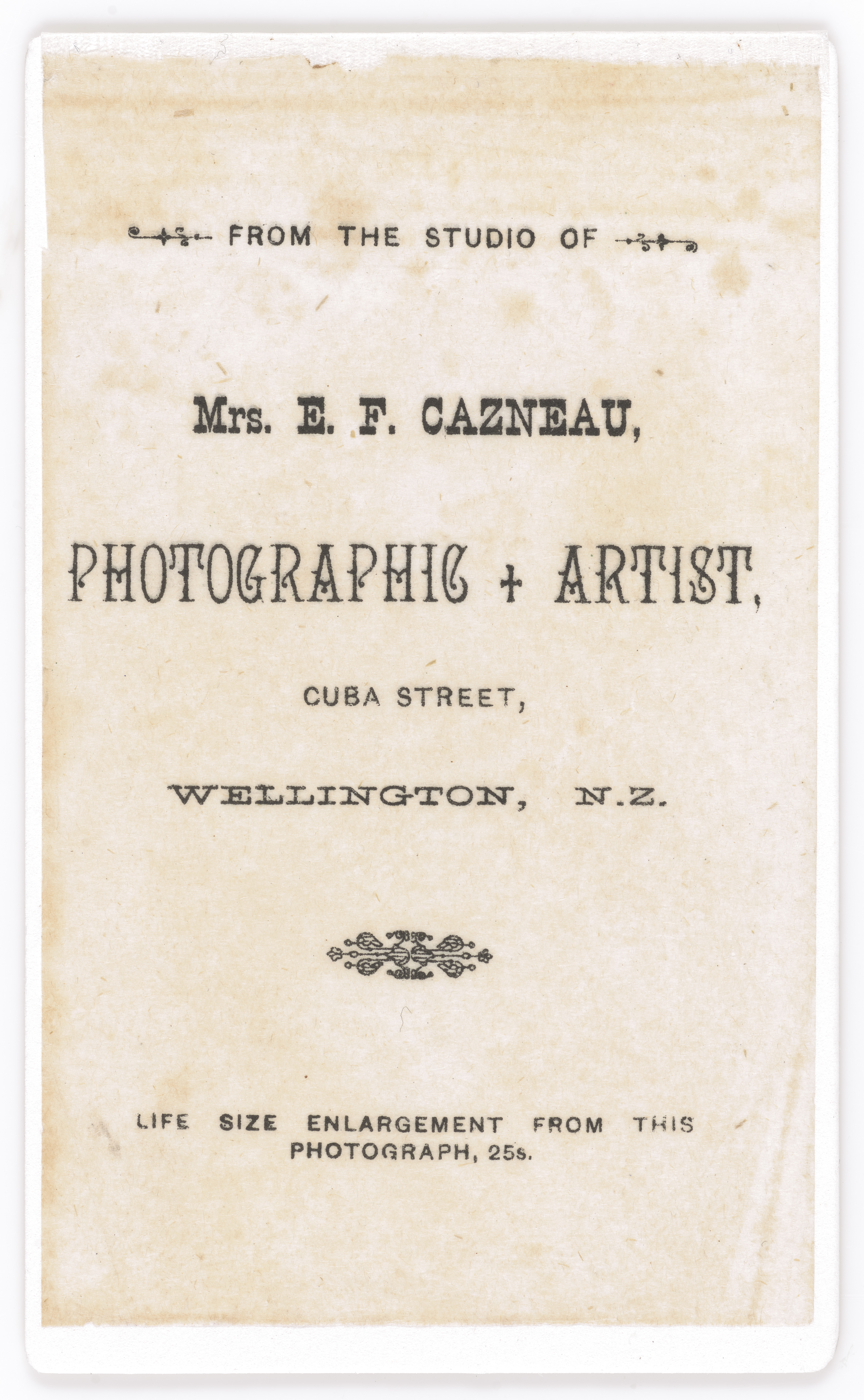
Flyleaf from carte-de-visite by Mrs Cazneau, circa 1885, Wellington, by Emily Florence Cazneau. Te Papa (O.048930/B-B)

Emily Florence Cazneau (née Bentley, 14 May 1855 – 24 March 1892) was an Australian born New Zealand artist and professional photographer. Cazneau originally worked in Sydney at the Freeman Brothers photographic studio as a colourist and miniature painter. She moved to Wellington in the early 1870s, establishing a professional photographic studio with her husband.

Cazneau took photographs of the Mount Tarawera eruption. She also lectured at the Exhibition Building in Wellington using lantern slides made from her negatives.

She continued to operate the studio until 1890 when she moved to Adelaide. She died on 24 March 1892. Examples of her work are held in the collection of the Museum of New Zealand Te Papa Tongarewa. The National Library of New Zealand also holds examples of her work.

== Family ==
Cazneau met her husband Pierce Mott Cazneau while working at Freemans Brother. She married him on 23 December 1876. She went on to give birth to her son Harold on 30 March 1878 in Wellington.
