= Winnie Bamara =

Australian Indigenous artist

Winnie Bamara (born 1939 or 1940; – 1987) was the first Indigenous Australian woman artist to paint in a European realist style. Her ability to paint scenes accurately and solely from memory attracted wide attention in the 1950s. She was hailed as a "female Albert Namatjira".

== Early life ==
Winnie Bamara was born in 1939 or 1940 in the South Australian Nullarbor Station near Ooldea on the East-West line. When she was seven, she was taken to the Plymouth Brethren Umeewarra Aborigines' Mission Station near Port Augusta's main street. She remembered suffering from painful "sand" in her eyes (trachoma, in fact), for treatment of which Winnie spent three months in the Adelaide Children's Hospital and there also fell victim to polio, but this was not noticed until after she had returned to the mission station. Polio affected Winnie's left arm which was thinner than the right. Later, she also suffered from diabetes.

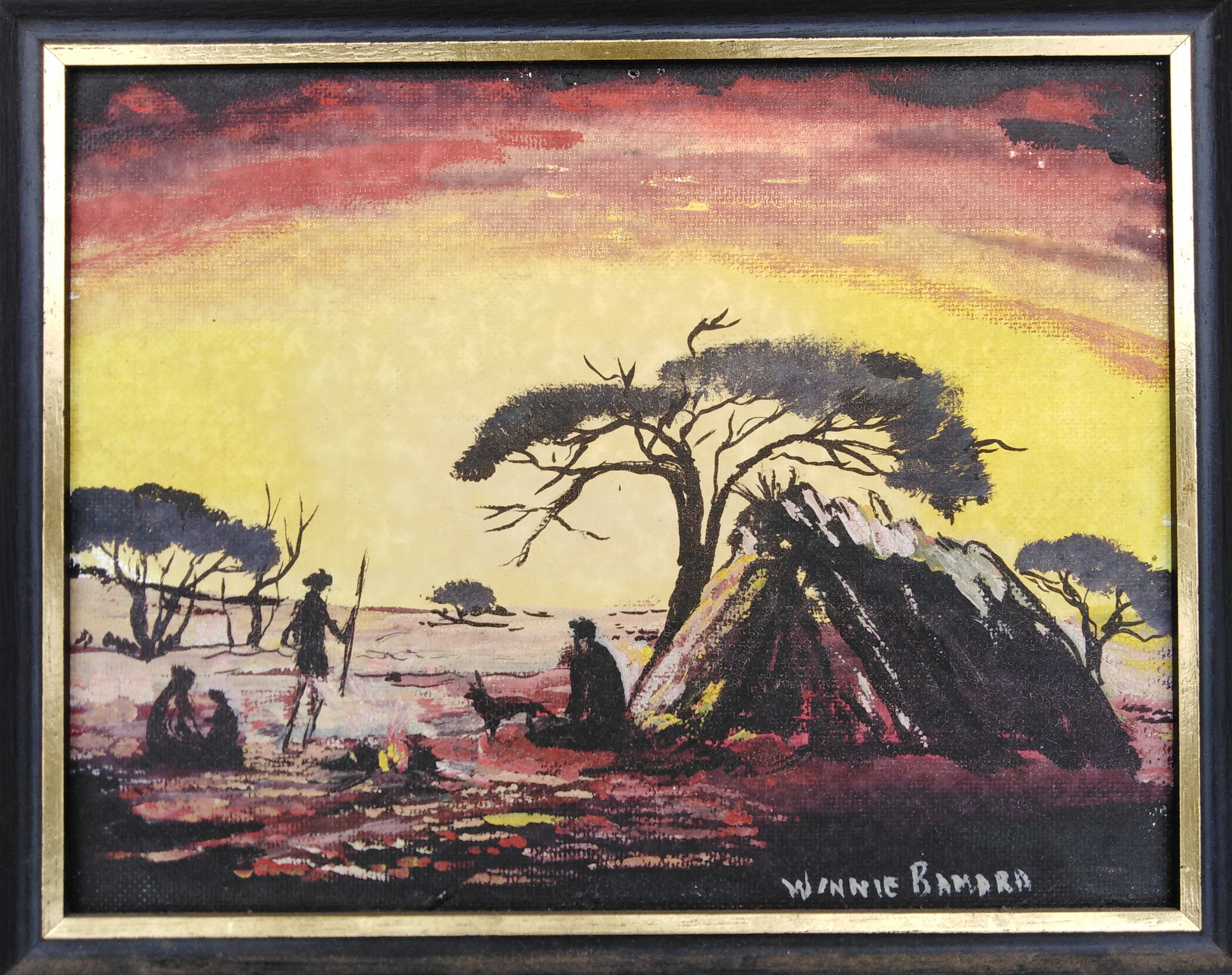
Winnie Bamara Painting. 22.3cm x 17cm. Uploaded by the owner.

== Artistic talent ==
She attended the mission school, a crowded galvanised iron building, where it was noticed that her learning had been affected by her time in hospital, but her teacher Miss M. Cantle noted and encouraged her drawing ability, giving her a box of watercolours with which it was found that, without any instruction, she could paint perspectively correct specific landscape scenes around Port Augusta, completely from memory. In a 1957 newspaper interview Cantle reported;

"On outings to the Flinders Range, Minnie [sic] seems able to make a mental photograph of a landscape in three-dimensional colour. She does no sketching or painting on the spot but paints the scene in watercolour at the mission."

Bamara became a teacher at the Mission School in her 20s.

Bamara's image-making was in the Western representational style and she was credited with a "photographic memory". She was the first Australian indigenous woman known to work in the realist manner. Attempts to provide her with lessons in a correspondence course, and from a visiting artist, proved fruitless, and Cantle supported the young artist's need to learn by herself. Nevertheless, in October 1957 teachers at the National Art School in Sydney, which had provided the correspondence course, granted her free tuition and that December she flew there and spent a week in the School, but was too reticent to talk to teachers or fellow students. Principal of the School, Mr. L. Roy Davies, said: "It is extraordinary that an untrained girl in an aborigine mission station should paint realistic pictures of her surroundings."

== Reputation ==
Bamara's talent attracted the attention of Adelaide and interstate newspapers. In 1959 photographer David Beal, passing the mission on his way back from an assignment in far north Australia, stopped to photograph her and examples of her work. By that time the Mission was crowded with 59 children accommodated in the Home, which tended to 49 other children resident on the Reserve with their families. Beal's newspaper The Sunday Mail showed interest in encouraging and publicising her work and sponsored an exhibition in Adelaide at the Public Library on North Terrace in February 1959 to the opening of which she was driven by the then Mayor of Port Augusta, Mr Lyn Riches, who was also the Speaker in the Adelaide Parliament. He consequently introduced many Australian and overseas dignitaries to Winnie's artwork. Influential South Australian journalist Sir Lloyd Dumas opened the show to an audience of 200 and, seen by 8,000 visitors, it sold out.

== Later career ==
By 1961 Bamara had completed her first year of study at the South Australia School of Art in Adelaide where she was awarded the Frank and David Bulbeck Prize for most improved student in oils that year. She showed during 1963 in the Advertiser Open-Air Art Exhibition.

When Anita Staude interviewed Winnie at Ceduna in December 1984 Bamara was still painting at forty-five, and in 1985 was granted $1400 for the purchase of art materials from the Aboriginal Arts Board.

In 1987 Bamara, who lived near Maralinga, produced a painting for a poster protesting nuclear testing at Maralinga, for the Australian Council for Disarmament and Peace for Maralinga Day, 1987 which was produced by Common Ground Magazine with the support of the people of the Maralinga–Tjarutja community. Her image shows a nuclear bomb exploding on the Maralinga lands as three Indigenous people stand watching, with text that briefly discusses the history of the British Government testing of nuclear bombs at Maralinga.

== Personal life ==
In the 1960s Bamara married William Fredrick Smith (1942 – 2014) and their children were Russell, Robyn, Anthony, and Shona, and Eugene and Lillian, who were both deceased at the time of his death. She was noted as "the late" Winnie Bamara in husband Smith's 2014 obituary in the Adelaide Advertiser. Winnie died at the Royal Adelaide Hospital in 1987. She is buried in the Port Augusta General Cemetery with Nellie Bamara.

== Reception ==
On viewing her work before her first exhibition, National Gallery of Australia director Robert Campbell remarked;

"I understand that Winnie Bambara [sic] has had no tuition or contact with other watercolour painters, and so it was a surprise to find that her work was so sophisticated, suggesting that she had studied the work of some of the earlier English watercolorists. While obviously we cannot expect a high standard in the work of so young an artist, it is interesting to find that there is not even a hint of the primitive outlook of some of the Aranda artists. How she will develop and whether some guidance would really be helpful it is difficult to say."

Writing in The Canberra Times about the "Aboriginal Art Show" at the Academy of Science in Acton, Canberra, in which her work was shown with that of Gordon Waye and Bill Lennon, Melbourne critic John Reed called her "gifted", comparing her work with that of Belgian emigrant and Australian autodidact painter Henri Bastin.

Writers and critics often compared Bamara with Albert Namatjira, though she is now not as well remembered. Principal at the National Art School L. Ron Davies reported that;

She has been shown examples of Namatjira’s work but has not tried to model her style on them. I’ve been told that after seeing Namatjira’s work she said, ‘That is his country. My country is different,’ and she went on painting in her own style."

Bamara's work has since largely slipped from attention and at auctions in 2015 her work on paper fetched only $110, and her paintings less than $100.

== Exhibitions ==
- 1959: An exhibition of watercolors by Winnie Bamara : sponsored by The Sunday Mail, Public library lecture room, North Terrace, 17–24 February
- 1963: Advertiser Open-air Art Exhibition, Adelaide
- 1974: Aboriginal Art Show at the Academy of Science in Acton, Canberra
- 2010, May: Winnie Bamara – The shy girl with the photographic eyes, Port Augusta Cultural Centre

== Collections ==
A painting by Bamara was presented to the President Sukarno of Indonesia, and one was purchased by Prince Philip.

- National Museum of Australia
