= Helmut Gritscher =

Austrian skier, ski instructor, and photographer (1933–2015)

- Born: 6 June 1933; Wattens, Austria
- Died: 24 November 2015 (aged 82)
- Occupations: Skier, ski instructor and photographer

Helmut Gritscher (6 June 1933 – 24 November 2015) was an Austrian-born skier, ski instructor and photographer who worked in Australia 1961–70.

== Biography ==
Helmut Gritscher was born 7 June 1933 in Wattens, in the Austrian Tyrol. A ski instructor, he traveled and worked in the mountains of Europe, Lebanon, and the United States before moving to Australia in 1961 to join the Perisher Ski School in the Mt. Kosciuszko ski fields and producing his first book, Skiing, on ski technique, with fellow instructor Fritz Halbwidl.

== Photographer ==
Gritscher stayed in Australia because he "wanted to photograph something which has only been partly explored visually" to produce his second book, The High Country, on the Australian Alps photographed in winter and summer, for which he asked Craig McGregor to write the text. Of the process of taking the photographs he remembered, "with every day I spent in those mountains I discovered more beautiful things, and my life became richer," sentiments on which he elaborated in an interview:

"Some of the world's most wonderful and bizarre trees are here, unmatched in their variety of colour, texture, and shape. The most fascinating discovery for me was the huge stretches of untouched land I saw when I walked through and camped on the lonely high plains ... There was not one sign that a human being had walked there before; only the weird and unreal shapes of dead trees and rocks and an unspeakable quietness and melancholy over the whole land."

His subjects in the Alps included not only skiers and the landscape, but also the Snowy Mountains hydroelectric project.

To Sydney with Love, his third book, took as its subject Sydney's beaches and harbour, and there he photographed the older suburbs, rugby, the Sydney Opera House, and various cultural events.

Gristcher's photographs were published frequently for articles and covers in Walkabout as well as Pacific Islands Monthly, and he was profiled in Craig McGregor's 1969 survey of Australian arts In The Making.

Returning to Europe in 1970, Gritscher continued to produce illustrations there for ski stories. and he was represented by Aspect picture library, London, which distributed his photographs to publishers including Life books, Reader's Digest, Sports Illustrated (including covers of issues from 2 and 16 February 1976), and National Geographic into the 1990s. The publisher of Sports Illustrated amusingly recounts in a 1976 issue how, during the shooting of a group photo, Helmut's car came to be forcibly removed by a platoon of Austrian soldiers in front of the Bergisel ski-jumping stadium.

Gritscher died, aged 82, on 24 November 2015 in his home town of Wattens, Austria where his ashes are interred, and was survived by his wife Gerda, sons Thomas and Andreas, and siblings Paula and Herbert.

== Reception and recognition ==
Peter Fenton, in reviewing The High Country for The Age writes that "Gritscher's camera work which dominates 'The High Country' and, ipso facto, gives the book a rather stronger coffee-table flavour, is generally as first-class as we expect of him. Occasionally it is beyond adjectives, notably his color, in which his flair for catching the play of light on snowy mountaintops, sheep's backs, birds' feathers, alpine flowers, boulders chalets, trees and other objects is impressively expressed."

Craig McGregor regarded Gritscher as amongst a few who had "made the crucial breakthrough in Australian photography", and in In The Making records that another photographer commented "Helmut has a love affair with every subject he takes." He worked alongside, and as the equal of, significant Australian practitioners; photographs by Gritscher were purchased, with those of David Beal, David Moore, Lance Nelson and Richard Woldendorp in 1969 for the National Gallery of Victoria, Melbourne through the KODAK (Australasia) Pty Ltd Fund.

== Exhibitions ==
- 1969, December; group show with other works from the NGV collection by David Beal, David Moore, Lance Nelson and Richard Woldendorp, National Gallery of Victoria.

== Publications ==
=== Books ===
- Gritscher, Helmut; McGregor, Craig, 1933– (1967), The high country : Photographs: Helmut Gritscher, Angus & Robertson
- To Sydney with love/ [Photography: Helmut Gritscher. Text: Craig McGregor, City of Sydney Archives, 1968
- Gritscher, Helmut; Wakla, Eric; Halbwidl, Fritz (1968), Skiing : a pictorial handbook of instruction, Ure Smith
- Gritscher, H., & New South Wales. (1970). New South Wales, Australia: Professional ski race, Mount Kosciusko. Sydney, N.S.W.: New South Wales Dept. of Tourism.

==== Contributor ====
- Hueneke, Klaus (1990), Kosciusko : where the ice-trees burn, Tabletop Press, ISBN 978-0-9590841-1-5
- Reader's Digest Association (1971), Australia : this land – these people (1st ed.), Reader's Digest Association, ISBN 978-0-909486-04-4
- McGregor, Craig; McGregor, Craig, 1933–; Beal, David, 1936- (1968), Life in Australia, Southern Cross International

=== Magazine articles ===
- Elyne Mitchell, with photographs by Helmut Gritscher, 'The Dream That Is Mount Townsend,' In Walkabout. Vol. 32 No. 6 (1 June 1966), pp. 16–19, Australian Geographical Society.
- Robin Boyd (1963-12-01), "Australia's Split-Level Culture", Walkabout, 29 (12), Australian National Travel Association, ISSN 0043-0064
