= Claude Stump =

Australian embryologist

Claude Witherington Stump FRSE (28 October 1891 – 23 December 1971) was an Australian embryologist who served in two wars.

== Life ==
He was born at Austral Terrace in Malvern near Adelaide on 28 October 1891, the second child of Alfred Augustus Stump a well-known Tasmanian photographer, by his second wife, Rosa Ada Potter. He was educated at the Kyre College (now Scotch College, Adelaide) in Unley and the University of Adelaide.

He went to Edinburgh in Scotland to study medicine in 1910.

He joined the British Red Cross prior to the First World War to provide medical aid to the Serbian Army in the Balkan War 1912–1913. In 1914 at the onset of the First World War he joined the 8th (Service) Battalion, Kings Own Scottish Borderers. He was promoted to lieutenant in January 1915. He fought at Loos and on the Somme, then in 1916 he returned to Edinburgh to complete his degree, graduating with an MB ChB in 1917. He returned to Australia in December 1917 and joined the Australian Army Medical Corps (AAMC) as a captain, embarking from Adelaide in 1918 on HMAT "Borda" and returning to France to serve with the 11th Field Ambulance. He was demobbed in November 1919 at the rank of captain.

He received a Crichton Scholarship in 1920 and began lecturing in anatomy at the University of Edinburgh. He also worked as a surgeon in the Edinburgh Royal Infirmary. In 1922 he was appointed a Carnegie Research Fellow. In the same year he won the Gunning Victoria jubilee prize for his MD thesis "Histogenesis of the Bone". In 1924 he was appointed Professor of Anatomy and Histology at the University of Bangkok (partly funded by the Rockefeller Foundation. In 1926 he returned to Australia as associate professor of anatomy at Sydney University. Two years later the university made him the first Bosch Professor of Embryology and Histology and he remained in that role until retiral in 1956. His position as Bosch Professor was filled by Kenneth Wollaston Cleland.

In 1930 he was elected a Fellow of the Royal Society of Edinburgh. His proposers were Arthur Robinson, Sir Edward Albert Sharpey-Schafer, James Lorrain Smith and Charles George Lambie.

From 1935 to 1938 he lived in Parramatta. He then moved to Bradfield. He retired to Palm Beach, New South Wales.

He died at Mona Vale on 23 December 1971. He was cremated with no religious service.

== Family ==
In 1920 he married Christina Margaret Calder Urquhart (1893–1965) from Eskbank near Edinburgh. They married at the North British Hotel in Edinburgh.

They had one son and two daughters.
