= Cecil Bostock =

Australian photographer

Cecil Westmoreland Bostock (1884–1939) was an Australian photographer, born in England. He emigrated to New South Wales with his parents in 1888. His father, George Bostock, was a bookbinder who died a few years later in 1892.

Bostock had an important influence on the development of photography in Australia, initiating a response to the strong sunlight. He presided over the transition from Pictorialism to Modernism and was a mentor to several famous Australian photographers: notably Harold Cazneaux and Max Dupain.

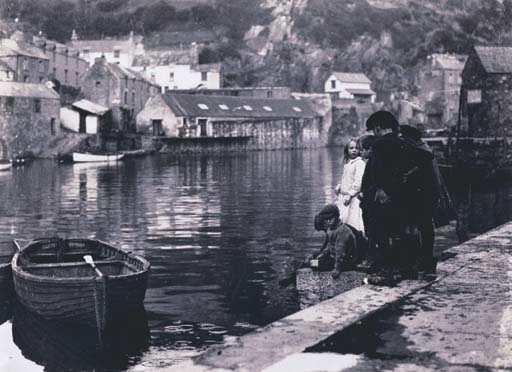
Polperro Harbour: 1917, by Cecil Bostock

== Early life ==
Cecil was first apprenticed as an electrical fitter in the Waverley Tramway Workshop. He left home around 1901 as his mother was not pleased with his decision at that time to become an artist. In 1916 he became secretary of the Photographic Society of N.S.W., and a foundation member of the Sydney Camera Circle. In addition he became a member of the Commercial Artists' Association of New South Wales, implying he worked as a photographer.

== World War I ==
Bostock served in the Australian Imperial Force from 1917 to 1920. His Unit was the Field Artillery Brigade, May 1917 Reinforcements, which embarked from Sydney, New South Wales, on board HMAT A28 Miltiades on 2 August 1917.

He served as a gunner where he made his only image of the war Day breaks-cold-shrieking-bloody.

He was discharged from the army in February 1920 in Sydney, and soon after married an English girl he had met in London while there for six months in 1919. In London, Bostock joined the Royal Photographic Society and socialized in photography circles. He also held a one-man show of his watercolours of war scenes at the Adelphi Gallery in 1920.

== The Sydney Camera Circle ==
On 28 November 1916, a group of six photographers met at Bostock's 'Little Studio in Phillip Street' to form the Pictorialist " Sydney Camera Circle ". This initially included Cecil Bostock, James Stening, W. S. White, Malcolm McKinnon and James Paton, and they were later joined by Henri Mallard.

A "manifesto" was drawn up by Cecil and signed by all six attendees who pledged "to work and to advance pictorial photography and to show our own Australia in terms of sunlight rather than those of greyness and dismal shadows". This established what was known as the 'sunshine school' of photography. The style of pictorialism practiced by Australians was "concerned with the play of light, sunshine and shadow, and the attention to nature and the landscape, and had an affinity with the Heidelberg School of painters."

During the war Harold Cazneaux used Bostock's Phillip St. studio in Denman Chambers while Bostock was away. 'The Circle' records show that meetings continued to be held in Bostock's studio until 1921.

The Sydney Camera Circle(1920's - 40's): In 2002 a photography exhibit was held at the Shoto Museum of Art in Tokyo and the Members listed by Yuri Mitsuda, Curator in the Exhibition Catalogue were: Cecil Westmoreland Bostock, Harold Pierce Cazneaux, Monte Luke(Charles Montague Luke), Henri Marie Joseph Mallard, D'Archy J. Webster, Charles E. Wakeford, William Stewart White, James E. Paton, Arthur William Christopher Ford, and Kiichiro(or Kihei) ISHIDA. Olive Cotton joined the Circle in 1939 as the first female member.

== Professional work ==
From 1920 Bostock worked as a professional photographer. He opened commercial photography studios in various city locations in Sydney. His studio soon became notable for colourful and decorative work in the new field of advertising, illustration, and graphic design. Max Dupain started his career in Bostock's studio, and worked there from 1930 to 1934. Dupain worked as Bostock's assistant and was given grounding in studio lighting, large format camera usage and the usage of black & white film and processing.

== Work as a pictorialist ==
His photographs, on the other hand, used the techniques of pictorialism. However, as time went on, Bostock used the soft-focus, and painterly printing processes, such as bromoil, so characteristic of the era less than in his earlier years as a photographer. His work became more austere and less manipulated, than the work of other pictorialist colleagues.

In 1917, Bostock produced an album titled: "A Portfolio of Art Photographs" in which were mounted ten small photographs. This was a limited edition of 25 copies. These met with mixed reviews, reflecting the new trends in photography towards modernism.

== Later life ==
Just prior to his death from cancer, Bostock was instrumental in forming The Contemporary Camera Groupe, which was designed to unite artists and photographers. 'The Groupe' held a first and only exhibition in December 1938, for which Bostock designed the catalogue. He had previously edited and designed the catalogues for the Australian Salon exhibitions in 1924 and 1926. The logo and 'Declaration' of the Sydney Camera Circle were also his work. Bostock, who was a skilled craftsman and bookbinder, also bound various albums for 'The Circle'.

In his later years, Bostock's work turned toward big prints, glossy surfaces and geometric pattern which were becoming fashionable with young photographers in the late 1930s.

In 1934, he was largely responsible for the illustrations for The Book of the Anzac Memorial N.S.W. (1934).

Bostock's work and studio pieces were scattered after his death, but a few examples are held by Australian National libraries and Museums.

In 2005 an exhibition of his work was held at the Lady Denman Maritime Museum on the south coast of NSW.

== Publications by Bostock ==
- A portfolio of art photographs by Cecil W Bostock :Publisher: Sydney : C.W. Bostock, 1917.
- "Cameragraphs" of the year 1924 : a souvenir of the first exhibition of the Australian Salon of Photography
- "Cameragraphs" of the year 1926 : selections from the second exhibition of the Australian Salon of Photography
- Catalogue of an exhibition of camera pictures held in Farmer's Exhibition Hall 22 April to 3 May, inclusive, 1924 : officially opened by the Hon. Sir William Cullen, K.C.M.G. on Tuesday, 22 April 1924
