= David Potts (photographer) =

Australian documentary photographer

- Born: 1926; Sydney, Australia
- Died: 2012 (aged 85–86)
- Known for: Documentary photography

David Potts (1926–2012) was an Australian documentary photographer. Potts worked with various fashion and commercial photographers. He left Australia in the 1950s to go to London where he worked as a photojournalist. Potts' photography work was considered distinctive with an unusual tone and sensitivity.

== Early life ==
After finishing high school in 1944, Potts served in the Royal Australian Air Force. He later developed an interest in photography; in 1945, during the Repatriation Scheme, he trained to improve his skills.

== Career ==
Potts got practical experience at The University of Sydney.

Potts worked for Russell Roberts Pt Ltd, a commercial illustration studio, and worked with photographers such as Laurie Le Guay and John Nisbett. Potts captured photos of the Sydney scene with David Moore. Potts left Sydney in 1950 to work in photojournalism in London. Potts worked with Israel and Cyprus while working with Life Magazine, The Observer and Picture Post.

In 1955, Potts returned to Sydney while continuing to work for Life Magazine. He formed a group, "The Six Photographers" in 1954, to discuss and criticize the work of its members. They held an exhibition in Sydney where they reasserted the importance of subject matter rather than pure style. The exhibition stressed the need to make spontaneous and personal recordings of observed entities and human behavior' as opposed to the slickness of commercial work.

Since 1960-65 Potts has owned and operated his own studio in Sydney and has continued to live in Sydney working on his own photograph, however, Potts has been inactive in the professional industry of photography.

Potts became well known in London for photographing cat shows and Israel. Some of Potts' most famous work were of Judges of Cat Shows and in Cyprus.

== Works ==
- 1953–Nicosia, Cyprus, 1953, Black and White.
- 1953–Piccadilly Circus, 1953, Colour.
- 1960–Andrew Sibley, Sydney Painter
