= Norma Tullo =

Australian fashion designer (1935–2019)

- Born: 31 January 1935; Australia
- Died: 18 February 2019 (aged 84)
- Occupation: Fashion designer
- Years active: 1960s–1980s
- Spouse: Brian King (m. 1962)

Norma Tullo (31 January 1935 – 18 February 2019) was an Australian fashion designer, known for her use of Australian wool in her women's fashion collections during the 1960s and 1970s. A recipient of the Wool Board Awards, the Lyrebird Award, and the David Jones Award, she was also appointed a Member of the Order of the British Empire in 1972 for her contributions to fashion.

== Early life and career ==
Tullo was born on 31 January 1935 in Australia. Before becoming a designer, she worked as a legal secretary in Melbourne, where she began creating clothes for herself and her friends.

In the early 1960s, she opened her own studio in Melbourne. She was an early advocate for using natural fibers, especially wool, in her designs, promoting Australian wool as a premium fabric.

In 1965, she was invited to collaborate with Butterick Patterns to produce patterns for home sewers as part of their Young Designers collection.

She signed a contract with the Isetan department store in Japan in 1966.

== See also ==
- Prue Acton
- Mary Quant
- Jean Muir
