= Alfred Stump =

Australian photographer

Alfred Augustus Stump (August 1860 – 24 December 1925) was a photographer and businessman born in Hobart, Tasmania, who had a considerable career in Adelaide.

== History ==
Alfred was born in Hobart, a son of butcher Mark Stump (c. 1824 – 7 July 1893) and Mary Anne Stump (c. 1827 – 22 June 1899).

He served an apprenticeship of four years. and joined with R. J. Nicholas as Nicholas & Stump, photographers of 57 Collins Street, Hobart in 1883, but left Tasmania in 1884, passing his business to F. R. Foot & Co., and moved to Adelaide, where he worked as chief operator for photographers Hammer & Co.

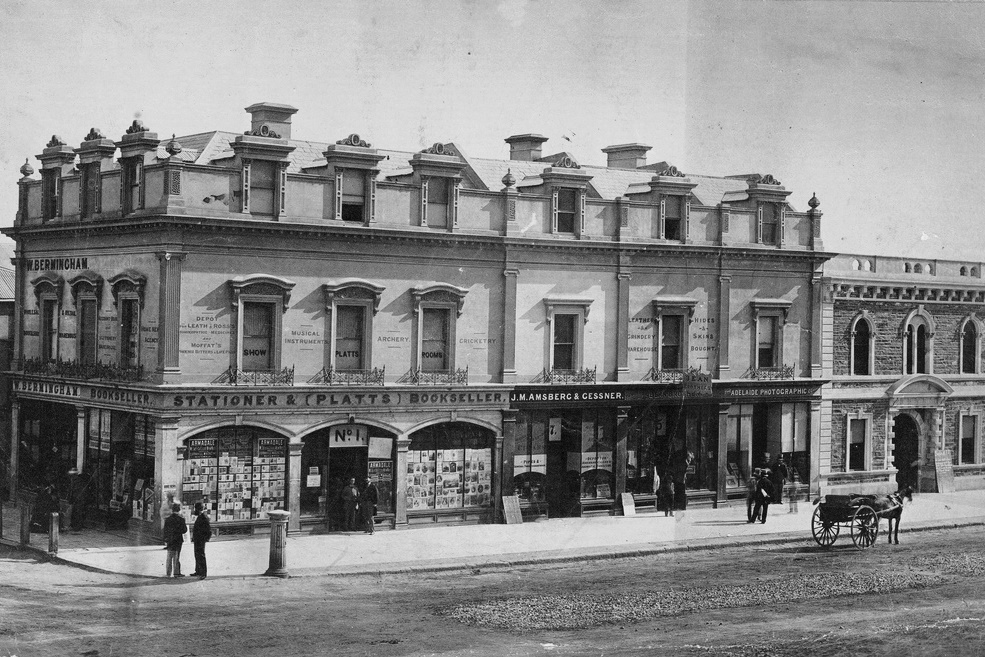
Platts's Corner, Neales' Building c. 1866. Adelaide Photographic Company at right.

By the time of the 1887 Jubilee Exhibition, he had left Hammer, and established Stump & Co. in the Gresham Arcade, at what was known as "Platts's Corner" then "Howell's Corner", north of Hindley and King William Streets, opposite what was later known as the Beehive Corner. Prominent signage ensured that "Stump's Corner" became a well-known Adelaide landmark and rendezvous. He was an adroit publicist; practically every newspaper had an advertisement for his business, and news items of some novelty or achievement almost every week. His photographers were kept busy capturing images of sporting teams and notable personalities, which were loaned to newspapers for reproduction (suitably attributed of course) and displayed in shop windows.

A notable employee was John Hood (previously with Townsend Duryea) as photo-colourist. Stump & Co. was one of the very few SA award winners at the 1888 Melbourne Exhibition. Another employee, Ernest P. Howard made news in a sphere unrelated to his employment — as Australia's fastest (220 wpm) shorthand writer. Several employees left to form their own businesses: Wherrett & Co. in the Gippsland district was one; John Dunn of the Ideal Studio, 143 Rundle Street in 1907, was another.

Stump opened a second studio, at 65 Rundle Street, in June 1889.

The King William Street studio was severely damaged by fire in July 1894, but was promptly made good, then the building was gutted by another fire in December 1900, and not reopened, the Rundle Street premises being retained.

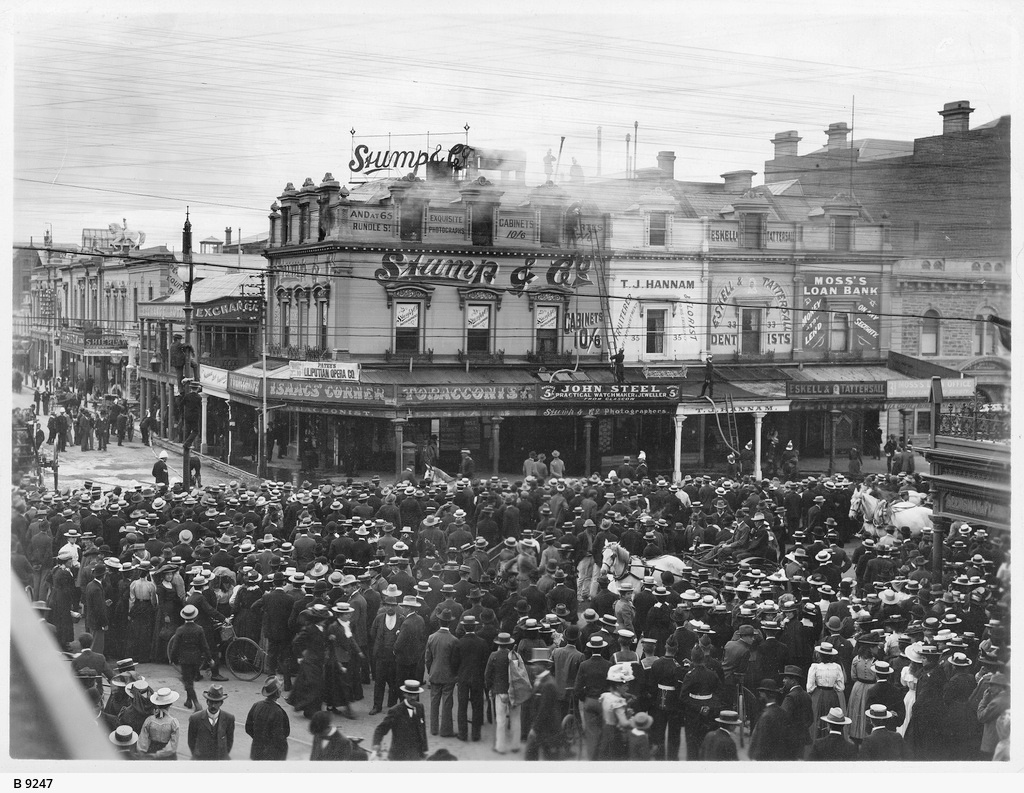
Fire at Stump's Corner December 1900

He was a leading member of the South Australian Photographic Society, and on occasion served as a judge, usually with F. C. Krichauff, A. Krichauff, H. P. Gill, J. Kauffmann. In 1908 he had some success in producing experimental coloured negatives ("autochromes"), and hence coloured slides, though colour printing to paper was not as yet possible.

He returned to Hobart with at least some of his family in 1908; at some stage he entered into partnership with Victor Lilley as "Vandyck photographers" in Hobart, dissolved January 1910,

With the advent of roll film and associated developing and printing businesses, largely associated with the Kodak company, and the growing availability of good quality portable cameras, photography passed into the hands of amateurs and independent professionals; studio photography became the province of small specialists. After the Rundle Street property changed owners, Stump & Co. relocated in September 1929 to Birks Pharmacy Building, Gawler Place, on the Rundle Street corner. Around 1911 Stump & Co. had joined with Hammer & Co. as Studios Limited at 37a Rundle Street, but the names of both studios continued separately.

Alfred Stump died at his residence "Coreega" (once the home of Sir Howard Florey) in Mitcham after some years of poor health.

== Notable photographs ==
- The best-known portrait of Mary MacKillop was published on a card by Stump & Co. c. 1873.

== Other interests ==
- He was a great lover of horses and owned several good animals. In his younger days he was a fine horseman and owned a pack of foxhounds; he frequently rode to hounds with his friend Deputy President Webb, of the Federal Arbitration Court. His horses won many prizes in the show ring. He was a member of both the South Australian Jockey Club and the Adelaide Racing Club over nearly 40 years. He owned several racehorses, but was not particularly successful.
- He was president of the Adelaide Drive Bowling Club 1917–1920; his business partner W. Hammer was another member.
- He was a Freemason and seldom missed a meeting. He was a foundation member of the Holdfast (No. 30) Lodge, and later became Worshipful Master. He was also a senior office holder of both the Royal Arch Chapter and the Mark Lodge.
- He was an active shareholder of the Hume Pipe Company.

== Family ==
Alfred Stump married twice, to Christina Mitchelmore (c. 1860 – September 1887) in 1884, and to Rosa Ada Potter (1867– ) in 1889; among their children were:

- Kenelm Alfred Stump (1890– ) married Ivy Lilian Jones ( 1888–1966) in November 1914. He was a photographer; emigrated to South America in May 1919, leaving his wife. She divorced him in 1923.
- Prof Claude Witherington Stump MD. DSc. (28 October? November? 1891 – 23 December 1971), known as "C. Witherington Stump", educated at Unley school and Kyre College (now Scotch College) where he was a champion gymnast and sports captain, University of Edinburgh; he held the Chair of Anatomy at the Bangkok University.
- Stanley Witherington Stump (1893–1984) married Ellen Dorothy Ambrose ( – ) in 1936. Known as "S. Witherington Stump", he was a photographer, founder of "Rembrandt Studios".
- Rosalind Olive Stump (1897– ) married Clifford Edwy Cornell (1887–1971) in 1920, lived at Mitcham.

They lived for some time at Austral Terrace, Malvern; in their last years at "Coreega", Fullarton Road (now Carrick Hill Road) Mitcham.

His remains were interred in the Mitcham Cemetery.

James F. Stump (c. 1853 – 24 October 1926), headmaster of Scotch College, Launceston and Hobart city treasurer, was a brother; he shared Alfred's interests in horse racing and Freemasonry. Ernest A. Stump (c. 1871 – 21 July 1930), manager of the Hobart branch of P. O. Fysh & Co. may have also been a brother. He shared Alfred's interest in bowling and Freemasonry.
