= Harold Cazneaux =

Australian photographer (1878–1953)

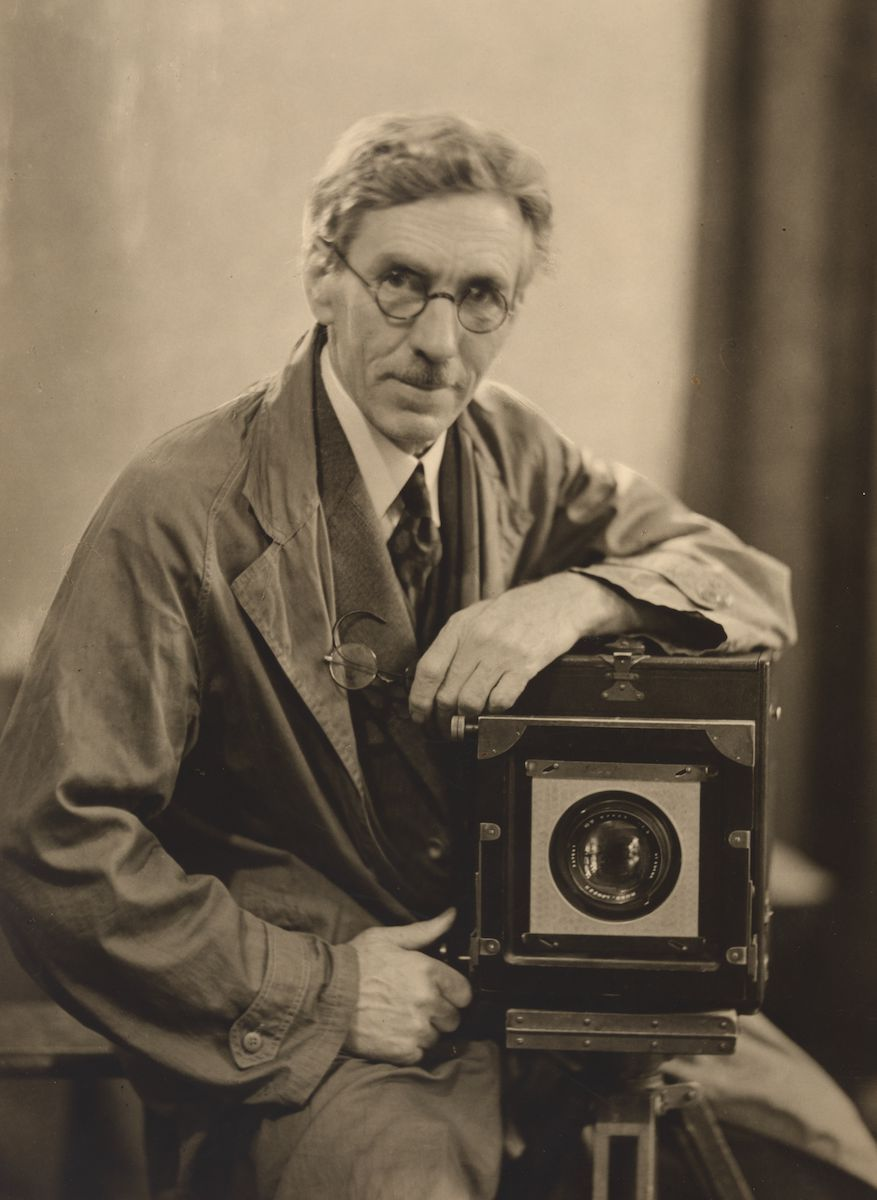
- Self-portrait, 1937
- Born: Harold Pierce Cazneaux; 30 March 1878; Wellington, New Zealand
- Died: 19 June 1953 (aged 75); Sydney, Australia
- Known for: Photography
- Movement: Pictorialism

Harold Pierce Cazneaux (30 March 1878 – 19 June 1953), commonly referred to as H. P. Cazneaux, was an Australian photographer. In 1916, he was a founding member of The Sydney Camera Circle. He regularly participated in national and international exhibitions.

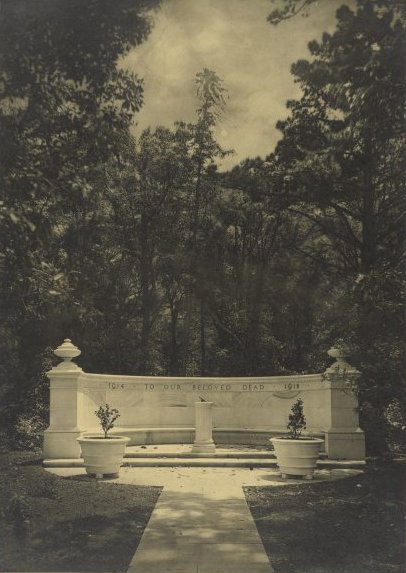
Cazneaux' photograph of Newington College War Memorial designed by William Hardy Wilson.

== Biography ==
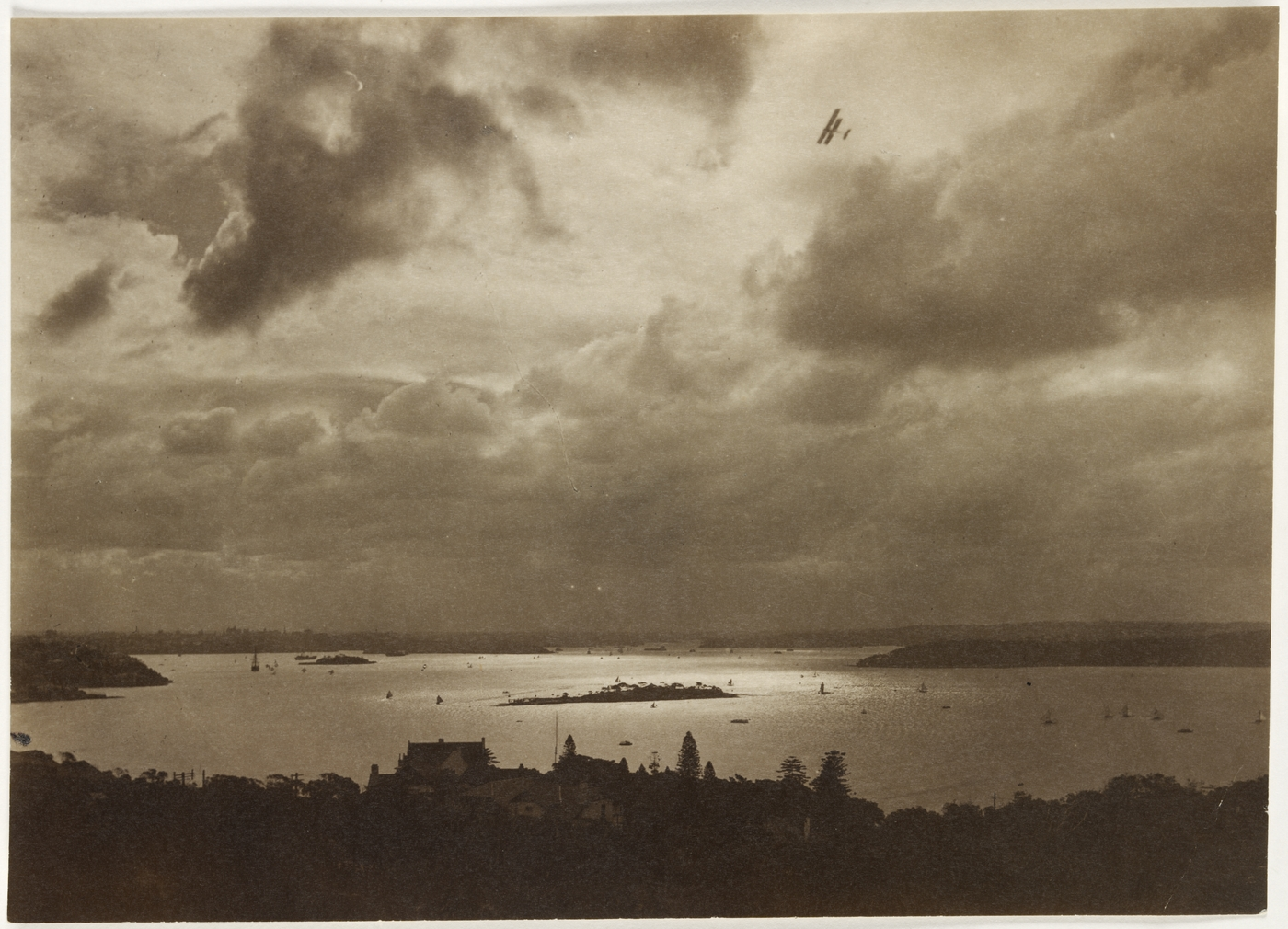
Sydney city photographic print by Harold Cazneaux about 1920, State Library of New South Wales, PXD 8061-39 a2057032h

Cazneaux was born in Wellington, New Zealand on 30 March 1878. His father, Pierce Mott Cazneau, was an English-born photographer, and his mother, Emily Florence Cazneau, was a colourist, miniature painter and photographer from Sydney. Around 1890 the family moved to Adelaide, where the father began working for Hammer & Co., photographers with a studio in Rundle Street.

Cazneaux received further education at (unnamed) state schools in Adelaide, and worked for his father, taking night classes at the School of Design, Painting and Technical Art. In 1896, he started working for Hammer & Co. as a photo retoucher.

In 1904, Cazneaux moved to Sydney, where he took up a position with one of Sydney's oldest photo studios, Freeman & Co. He was later appointed the firm's manager and chief operator. At the same time he honed his photographic skills documenting the architecture of old Sydney, and in 1907, exhibited at the Photographic Society of New South Wales. In 1909, he held the first one-man photographic exhibition in Australia.

Cazneaux' prints were exhibited in solo shows in the windows of the Kodak Salon, Sydney, as well as international shows organised by the London Salon of Photography (1911 to 1952), and later included in the Royal Photographic Society of Great Britain's annual salons. In 1914 he won Kodak's "Happiest Moment" competition, ostensibly open to amateur and professional alike, and the £100 prize money went toward a deposit for his future home.

Cazneaux was a founder of The Sydney Camera Circle, whose pictorialist "manifesto" was drawn up and signed on 28 November 1916 by a group of six photographers: Cecil Bostock, James Stening, William Stewart White, Malcolm McKinnon and James Paton, later joined by Henri Mallard. This group pledged "to work and to advance pictorial photography and to show our own Australia in terms of sunlight rather than those of greyness and dismal shadows". He left Freeman & Co. in 1917 or 1918.

In 1921, Cazneaux was elected a member of the London Salon and in 1937 he was the first Australian to be conferred with Honorary Fellowship by the Royal Photographic Society. Beyond his photographic oeuvre, Cazneaux was also a prolific writer. As a correspondent for Photograms of the Year (UK) for more than twenty years, he was the international voice of Australian photography. He was official photographer for Sydney Ure Smith's lifestyle magazine The Home from 1920 to 1941, and was commissioned to produce images for a number of Ure Smith's publications, including Sydney Surfing (1929), The Bridge Book (1930), The Sydney Book (1931) and The Australian Native Bear Book (1932). He also contributed to Ure Smith's prestige magazines Art in Australia and Australia: National Journal. His work encompassed the whole range of realist photography: portraiture, street scenes and landscape, notably in later years the Flinders Ranges. He was fascinated by old and new Sydney, particularly the Sydney Harbour Bridge and beach culture. He was a master of bromoil techniques, blurring out distracting features. His daughters acted as assistants and often appeared in his images.

== Recognition ==
Cazneaux' work was championed for decades by the editor of The Home magazine, Sydney Ure Smith.

The National Library of Australia is the home of the principal archive of Cazneaux prints and negatives, thanks to the generosity of the Cazneaux family. The Art Gallery of New South Wales also has a fine collection of Cazneaux' work, and was, in 1975, the first Australian museum to hold a major exhibition of his work.

The exhibition Harold Cazneaux: artist in photography at the Art Gallery of New South Wales in June and July 2008 included more than 100 of his images, exploring the breadth and depth of his work such as landscape, portraits, the harbour and the city.

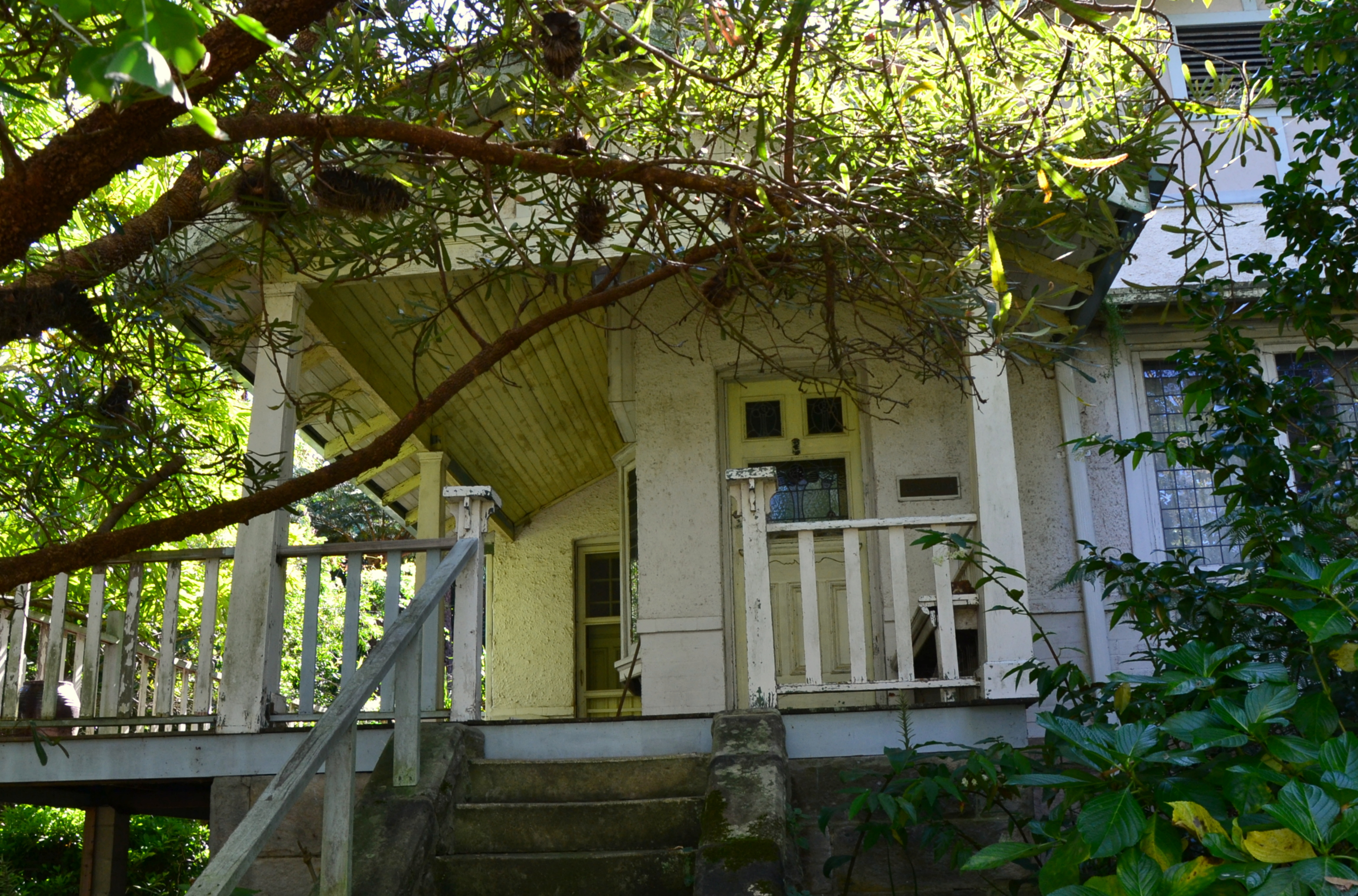
Ambleside, Cazneaux' cottage in Roseville

An exhibition of his photographs, called "Thoroughly modern Sydney: 1920s and 30s glamour and style" was held at the Museum of Sydney, in Sydney in August–October 2006. It was assembled largely from images he took for the Australian magazine "Home", though it also included new prints from previously unpublished negatives. Subjects ranged across "all that was fashionable and new" at that time, covering architecture, art and interior design, and also including many portraits of Australians then active in those fields.

== The Cazneaux Tree ==
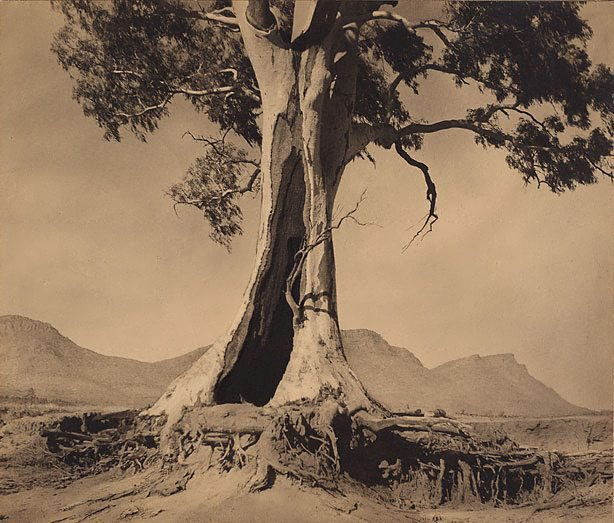
Spirit of endurance or 'The Cazneaux Tree', 1937

One of Cazneaux' most famous images was taken in 1937, of a solitary river red gum tree, near Wilpena Pound in the Flinders Ranges of South Australia. The title he gave to the photograph was "The Spirit of Endurance", for the qualities he felt epitomised the tree's survival in a harsh environment.

The tree still stands and, known as "The Cazneaux Tree", is a notable landmark within the Flinders Ranges National Park, classified as number 239 on the National Trust of South Australia's Register of Significant Trees.

== Publications ==
- Canberra, Australia's federal capital (1928)
- Sydney Harbour (1928)
- Sydney Surfing (1929)
- The Bridge Book (1930)
- The Sydney Book (1931)
- The Australian Native Bear Book (1932)
- The Frensham Book (1934)

== Family ==
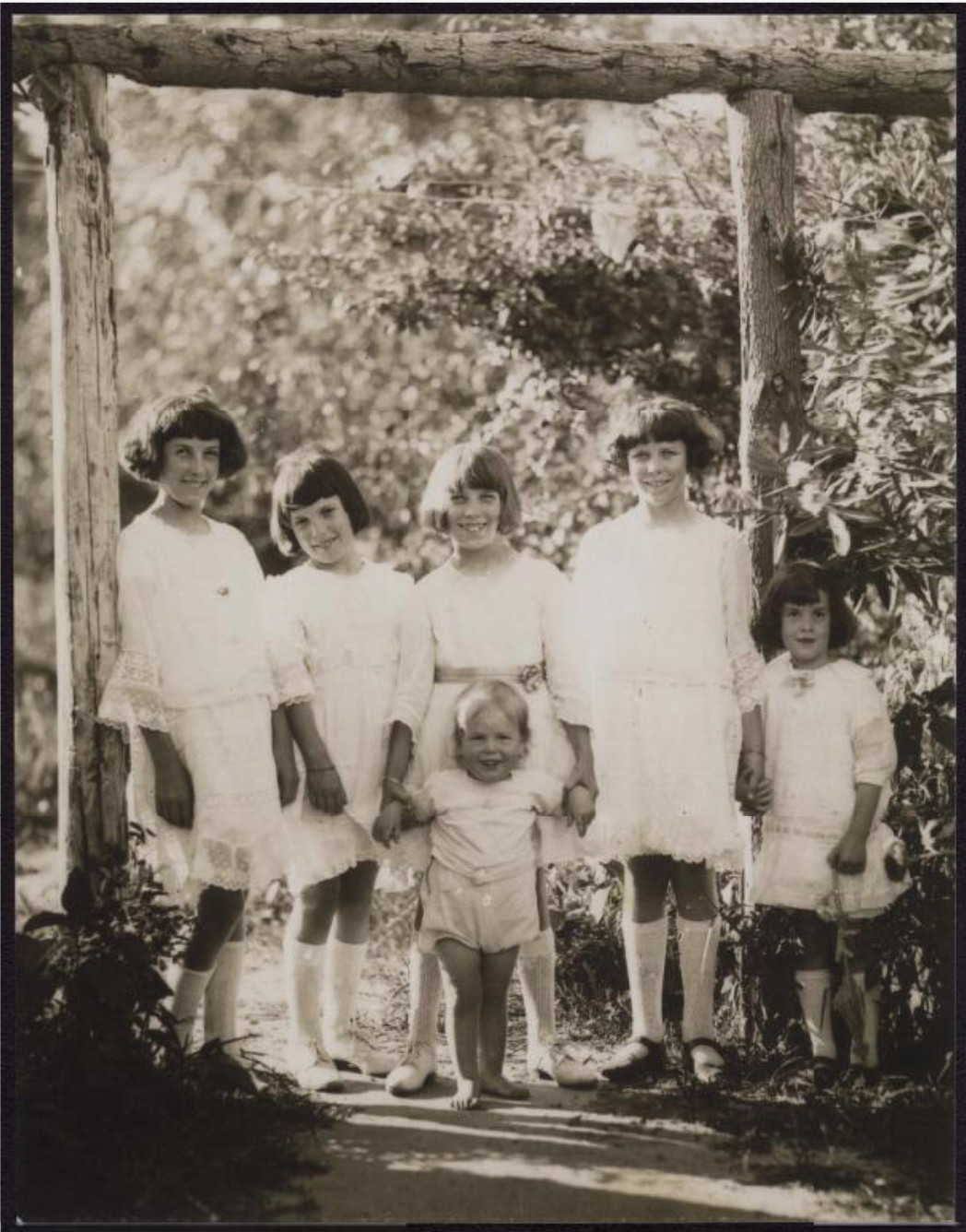
Jean, Carmen, Beryl, Harold, Rainbow and Joan Cazneaux at Ambleside, Roseville, New South Wales, 1922.jpg

Harold Pierce Cazneaux (1878–1953) married Mabel Winifred Hodge (1882–) on 1 September 1905. They had a home on Dudley Avenue, Roseville, New South Wales. Their family included:

- Rainbow Winifred Cazneaux (17 May 1908 – 26 July 2008) married (RAN) Lieut. Hugh Malanai Johnson (14 January 1905 – c. July 1943) on 5 June 1894
- Jean Lilian Cazneaux (20 December 1909 – 11 January 1980) married Eric James Blundell (31 Dec 1909 – 28 June 1986) of Roseville, NSW
- May Beryl Cazneaux (29 March 1911 – 30 April 1996)
- Carmen Florence Cazneaux (4 April 1913 – 15 October 2003)
- Joan Mabel Cazneaux (30 January 1916 or 1922 – 18 June 2004) married Herbert Smith sometime after 1938
  - Richard Harold Smith (18 March 1944 – ), well known as the entrepreneur and adventurer Dick Smith AC.
- Harold Ramsay Cazneaux (13 March 1920 – 14 September 1941) with 2nd AIF, died at Tobruk

Cazneaux lived for much of his life in Roseville, on Sydney's North Shore. There he established the garden studio that was his main place of work until he died. The house, a Federation cottage called "Ambleside", is located in Dudley Avenue, but was neglected as of 2012.

=== Siblings ===
Children of Pierce Mott Cazneau (c. 1849–1928) and Emma Cazneau, née Bentley (1855–1892); married 1876

- Harold Pierce Cazneaux (1878–1953), subject of this article
- Major Gordon Cazneaux (c. 1880 – 7 September 1941) married Lizzie Gray Provest, née Clark (died 7 September 1941) in 1915.
- Carmen Cazneaux (3 March 1882 – 1966) married Ralph "Bert" Hammer ( –1964) on 6 September 1905, They had a home "Aroha", 96 First Avenue, St Peters, a suburb of Adelaide. "Bert" was a son of studio photographer William H. Hammer.

Children of Pierce Mott Cazneau (c. 1849–1928) and Christina Margaret Jane Harley (c. 1867–1938), married 1895

- Harley John Cazneaux (3 November 1896 – 31 March 1960) married Stella Marie (not Maxine) Francis on 25 December 1926.
- Dorothy Harley "Dot" Cazneaux (6 March 1903 – ) married William Mansell Minear on 6 August 1923,

== Sources ==
- Helen Ennis "Intersections: Photography, History and the National Library of Australia", Canberra : National Library of Australia, 2004. ISBN 0-642-10792-0
- Melissa Miles "The Language of Light and Dark: Light and Place in Australian Photography", Sydney : Power Publications, 2015. ISBN 9780994306401
- Gael Newton. "Australian pictorial photography : a survey of art photography from 1898 to 1938 organised by the Art Gallery of New South Wales, Sydney" Sydney : Trustees of the Art Gallery of New South Wales, 1979. ISBN 0724017151
- Gael Newton; with essays by Helen Ennis and Chris Long and assistance from Isobel Crombie and Kate Davidson. "Shades of light : photography and Australia 1839-1988" Canberra : Australian National Gallery : Collins Australia, 1988. ISBN 0732224055 (Collins Australia : pbk.)
- Gael Newton "Silver and Grey: fifty years of Australian photography 1900 - 1950", Sydney: Angus and Robertson, 1980.
- Robert McFarlane, Leading light, Good Weekend magazine, 21 May 2008
