= Ebenezer (given name) =

- Gender: Male

Origin
- Language: Hebrew
- Meaning: "stone of the help"

Other names
- Short forms: Eben, Ben

Ebenezer, less commonly spelled Ebenezar, is a male given name of Hebrew origin meaning "stone of the help" (derived from the phrase Even ha-Ezer). The name is sometimes abbreviated as Eben. Ebenezer Scrooge from Charles Dickens' A Christmas Carol has given the name a negative connotation.

== List of people with the given name Ebenezer ==
- Ebenezer Adam (1919–2011), Ghanaian teacher and politician
- Ebenezer Adams (1765–1841), American educator
- Ebenezer Kwadwo Teye Addo, Ghanaian politician
- Ebenezer Addy (born 1940), Ghanaian sociologist and former sprinter
- Ebenezer Ackon (born 1996), Ghanaian footballer
- Ebenezer Ako-Adjei (1916–2002), Ghanaian politician
- Ebenezer Ato Ayirebi-Acquah (fl.1993–1997), Ghanaian politician
- Ebenezer Akinsanmiro (born 2004), Nigerian footballer
- Ebenezer Akuete (born 1935), Ghanaian diplomat and economist
- Ebenezer Akwanga (born 1970), Ambazonian independence activist
- Ebenezer Alden (1788–1881), American medical biographer and physician
- Ebenezer Allen (Vermont politician) (1743–1806), American patriot
- Ebenezer Allen (Texas politician) (1804–1863), American politician
- Eben Allen (1868–1931), Australian businessman and politician
- Ebenezer Assifuah (born 1993), Ghanaian footballer
- Ebenezer Theophilus Odartei Ayeh (born 1920), Ghanaian politician
- Ebenezer Thompson Baird (1821–1887), American minister
- Ebenezer Baldwin (1745–1776), American religious leader
- E.T. Barnette (1863–1933), American swindler
- Ebenezer Bassett (1833–1908), American ambassador
- Ebenezer Battelle (1754–1815), American politician and soldier
- Ebenezer Battle (fl.1779), American politician
- Ebenezer Bailey (1795–1839), American educator
- Ebenezer Beesley (1840–1906), writer and composer of Mormon religious music
- Ebenezer Blakely (1806–1889), American lawyer and politician
- Ebenezer Bradbury (1793–1864), American politician
- Ebenezer N. Briggs (1801–1873), American lawyer and politician
- Ebenezer Brigham (1789–1861), American pioneer and politician
- Ebenezer Brown (c.1824–1883), English-Canadian merchant and politician
- Ebenezer Bryce (1830–1913), Mormon pioneer
- Ebenezer John Buchanan (1844–1930), South African journalist and politician
- Ebenezer Burgess (1790–1870), American minister
- Ebenezer Butterick (1826–1903), American tailor and inventor
- Eben Byers (1880–1932), Socialite, industrialist, athlete
- Ebenezer Calendar, (1912–1985), Sierra Leonean musician
- Ebenezer Child (1770–1886), American composer
- Ebenezer Childs (1797–1864), American pioneer and legislator
- Ebenezer Coker (died 1783), English silversmith
- Ebenezer Colls (1812–1887), English painter
- Ebenezer Cooke (disambiguation), several people
- Ebenezer Crafts (1740–1810), American businessman
- Ebenezer Cunningham (1881–1977), British mathematician
- Ebenezer Dadzie (born 1975), Ghanaian footballer
- Ebenezer Moses Debrah (1928–2023), Ghanaian diplomat
- Ebenezer Denny (1761–1822), American soldier and politician
- Ebenezer V. Dickey (1821–1857), American politician from Pennsylvania
- Ebenezer Dimieari (fl.1948–1960), Nigerian Anglican priest
- Ebenezer Doan (1772–1866), American-Canadian builder
- Ebenezer Donkor (1938–2016), Ghanaian actor
- Ebenezer P. Dorr (1817–1881), American merchant
- Ebenezer Dumont (1814–1871), American politician and general
- Ebby Edwards (1884–1961), English politician
- Ebenezer Elliott (1781–1849), English poet
- Ebenezer Erskine (1680–1754), Scottish minister
- Ebenezer Ekuban (born 1976), American football player
- Ebenezer Elmer (1752–1843), American physician and politician
- Ebenezer Emmons (1799–1863), American geologist
- Eben Etzebeth (born 1991), South African rugby player
- Ebenezer Olatunde Farombi, Nigerian professor of biochemistry
- Ebenezer B. Finley (1833–1916), American Congressman
- Ebenezer Fitch (1756–1833), American Calvinist clergyman
- Ebenezer Fisher (fl.1785), American politician
- Ebenezer Fontes Braga (born 1969), Brazilian mixed martial artist
- Ebb Ford (1890–1974), British marine zoologist
- Ebenezer Forrest (fl.1774), English attorney
- Ebenezer Foster (fl.1783), English politician
- Ebenezer Fox (died 1886), English journalist
- Ebenezer Albert Fox (1857–1926), English poacher
- Ebenezer Ghansah (born 1959), British taekwondo practitioner
- Ebenezer Goddard (1816–1882), English engineer, businessman, and politician
- Ebenezer Grant (1882–1962), English footballer
- Ebenezer O. Grosvenor (1820–1910), American politician
- Ebenezer Hagan (born 1975), Ghanaian footballer
- Eben Hayes (1798–1881), American preacher and politician
- Ebenezer Hamlin (1844–1900), New Zealand politician
- Ebenezer Hazard (1744–1817), American businessman and publisher
- Ebenezer Henderson (1784–1858), Scottish minister and missionary
- Ebenezer Henderson (writer) (1809–1879), Scottish historian and writer
- Ebenezer Herrick (1785–1839), American politician
- Ebenezer J. Hill (1845–1917), American politician
- Ebenezer R. Hoar (1816–1895), American politician and lawyer
- Ebenezer Howard (1850–1928), British urbanist
- Ebenezer Kingsbury Hunt (1810–1889), American physician
- Ebenezer Kobina Fosu (born 1952), Ghanaian politician
- Ebenezer Huntington (1754–1834), American politician and soldier
- Ebenezer Jackson Jr. (1796–1874), American politician
- Ebenezer Johnson (1786–1849), American businessman and politician
- Ebenezer Alfred Johnson (1813–1891), American classical scholar
- Ebenezer Joshua (1908–1991), Vincentian politician
- Ebenezer Jones (1820–1860), English poet
- Ebenezer Kendell (1886–1966), Australian politician
- Ebenezer Kinnersley (1711–1778), English scientist, inventor, and lecturer
- Ebenezer Knowlton (1815–1784), American politician and minister
- Ebenezer Kojo Kum (born 1967), Ghanaian politician
- Ebenezer Laing (1931–2015), Ghanaian botanist and geneticist
- Ebenezer Landells (1808–1860), English wood-engraver, illustrator, and magazine proprietor
- Ebenezer Lane (1793–1866), American politician
- Ebenezer Learned (1728–1801), American soldier
- Ebenezer Lounsbery (c.1787–1868), American politician
- Ebenezer Mack (1791–1849), New York politician
- Ebenezer Mackintosh (1737–1816), American shoemaker and protester
- Ebenezer James MacRae (1881–1951), Scottish architect
- Ebenezer Maitland (1780–1858), English landowner and politician
- Ebenezer Magoffin (1817–1865), Confederate officer
- Ebenezer E. Mason (1829–1910), American farmer and magistrate
- Ebenezer Joseph Mather (1849–1927), English activist and writer
- Ebenezer Mattoon (1755–1843), American politician
- Ebenezer Cobb Morley (1831–1924), English sportsman
- Ebenezer Moseley (1813–1903), American-Canadian shipbuilder
- Ebby Nelson-Addy (born 1992), English footballer
- Ebenezer Norman (born 1981), Liberian philanthropist
- Ebenezer F. Norton (1774–1851), American politician
- Ebenezer Ntlali (born 1954), South African Anglican bishop
- Ebenezer Obey (born 1942), Nigerian pop musician
- Ebenezer Oduro Owusu (born 1960), Ghanaian entomologist
- Ebenezer Ofori (born 1995), Ghanaian footballer
- Ebenezer J. Ormsbee (1834–1924), American politician
- Ebenezer Parkes (1848–1919), English politician
- Ebenezer Peck (1805–1881), American attorney and politician
- Ebenezer W. Peirce (1822–1902), American soldier
- Ebenezer Pemberton (1746–1835), American educator
- Ebenezer Pemberton (minister) (1671–1717), colonial American clergyman
- Ebenezer J. Penniman (1804–1890), American politician
- Ebenezer Perry (1788–1876), Canadian merchant and politician
- Ebenezer Pettigrew (1783–1848), American politician
- Ebenezer Picken (1769–1816), Scottish poet
- Ebenezer Platt Rogers (1817–1881), American minister and author
- Ebenezer W. Poe (1846–1898), American politician
- Ebenezer Porter (1772–1834), American minister and writer
- Ebenezer Erskine Pressly (1808–1860), American theologian
- Ebenezer Prout (1835–1909), English musical theorist, writer, teacher, and composer
- Ebenezer Quartey (born 1934), Ghanaian sprinter
- Ebenezer Raynale (1804–1881), American physician and politician
- Ebenezer Rhodes (1762–1839), English topographer
- Ebenezer Russell (1747–1836), American politician
- Ebenezer Sandford (1848–1897), New Zealand politician
- Ebenezer Sage (1755–1834), American politician
- Ebenezer Seaver (1763–1844), American politician
- Ebenezer Seeley (1793–1866), American lawyer and politician
- Ebenezer Sekyi-Hughes (born 1939), Ghanaian politician
- Ebenezer J. Shields (1778–1846), American politician
- Ebenezer Shoobridge (1820–1901), Australian politician
- Ebenezer Sibly (1751–c.1799), English philosopher, astrologer, and writer
- Ebenezer Sunder Singh (born 1967), Indian-American visual artist
- Ebenezer Skellie (1842–1898), American soldier
- Ebenezer "Slick" Smith (1929–1997), American stock car racer
- Ebenezer Sproat (1752–1805), American soldier
- Ebenezer Stevens (1751–1823), American soldier and merchant
- Ebenezer Stoddard (1785–1847), American politician
- Ebenezer Syme (1825–1860), Scottish-Australian journalist
- Ebenezer Teichelmann (1859–1938), surgeon, mountaineer and photographer
- Ebenezer Okletey Terlabi (born 1969), Ghanaian politician
- Ebenezer Thayer (1746–1809), American politician
- Ebenezer Thomas (1802–1863), Welsh teacher and poet
- Ebenezer Torrey (1801–1888), American lawyer, politician, and banker
- Ebenezer Trotman (1809–1865), English architect
- Ebenezer Tucker (1758–1845), American politician
- Ebenezer Vickery (1827–1906), Australian businessman, pastoralist, and philanthropist
- Ebenezer Wake Cook (1843–1926), English painter
- Ebenezer Walden (1777–1857), American politician
- Ebenezer A. Warner (fl.1858–1862), American politician
- Ebenezer Ward (1837–1917), Australian politician and journalist
- Ebenezer Washburn (1756–1826), Canadian businessman and politician
- Ebenezer Webster (1739–1808), Father of Daniel Webster
- Ebenezer T. Wells (1835–1923), American jurist
- Ebenezer Whatley (1878–1933), English-Canadian farmer and politician
- Ebenezer Wilson (fl.1707–1710), American politician
- Ebenezer Young (1783–1851), American politician
- Ebenezer Zane (1747–1811), American pioneer

=== Fictional characters ===
- Ebenezer Scrooge, fictional character in Charles Dickens' 1843 novella A Christmas Carol. Scrooge is widely known in the English-speaking world as a cold-hearted miser who becomes redeemed after being visited by three ghosts on Christmas.
- Ebenezer Dorset, fictional character in O. Henry's 1907 story "The Ransom of Red Chief"
- Ebenezer Le Page, the chief protagonist and fictional author of The Book of Ebenezer Le Page by G. B. Edwards
- Ebenezer Blackadder, Blackadder character from Victorian England, introduced in 1988
- Ebenezer Balfour of Shaws, character in Robert Louis Stevenson's 1886 novel Kidnapped
- Ebenezer Gryce, character in 13 of Anna Katherine Green's detective novels, including The Leavenworth Case
- Ebenezer Loomer (Ebby), one of the two villains (along with his brother Jacob) in the 19th Famous Five book by Enid Blyton, Five Go to Demon's Rocks
- Ebenezer T. Squint, puppet character in the TV series Pinwheel
- Ebenezar McCoy, character from The Dresden Files series by Jim Butcher.
- Ebenezer, weird character in the Shamen song "Ebenezer Goode"
- Ebenezer Von Clutch, character from the video game Crash Bandicoot
- Ebenezer Lynxley, character from the 2025 animated film Zootopia 2.

== See also ==
- Eben-Ezer – A place mentioned as the site of two battles in the Books of Samuel of the Old Testament
- "Ebeneezer Goode" – A 1992 song by The Shamen
