= Colls =

Colls may refer to:

- Caroline Sturdy Colls (born 1985), British historian
- Ebenezer Colls (1812–1887), English marine painter
- Kevin Colls (1922–2009), Australian rules footballer
- Robert Colls (born 1949), British historian
- Thomas Colls (1822–1898), Australian politician
