= Eban =

Eban may refer to:

- Eban (name)
- Eban, Dzheyrakhsky District, village in the Republic of Ingushetia, Russia

== See also ==
- Eban number
- Eben
