= Ebenezer Cooke =

Ebenezer Cooke or Cook may refer to:

- Ebenezer Cooke (poet) (1667–1732), sometimes spelled Cook, London-born American poet
  - Ebenezer Cooke, a fictional version of the poet who is the protagonist of John Barth's 1960 novel The Sot-Weed Factor
- Ebenezer Cooke (politician) (1832–1907), Australian accountant and parliamentarian
- Ebenezer Cooke (art education reformer) (1853–1904), English art master and art education pioneer

== See also ==
- Ebenezer Wake Cook (1843–1926), Australian painter
- Ebenezer (given name)
