= F. S. Crawford =

Australian photographer and agricultural expert

Frazer Smith Crawford
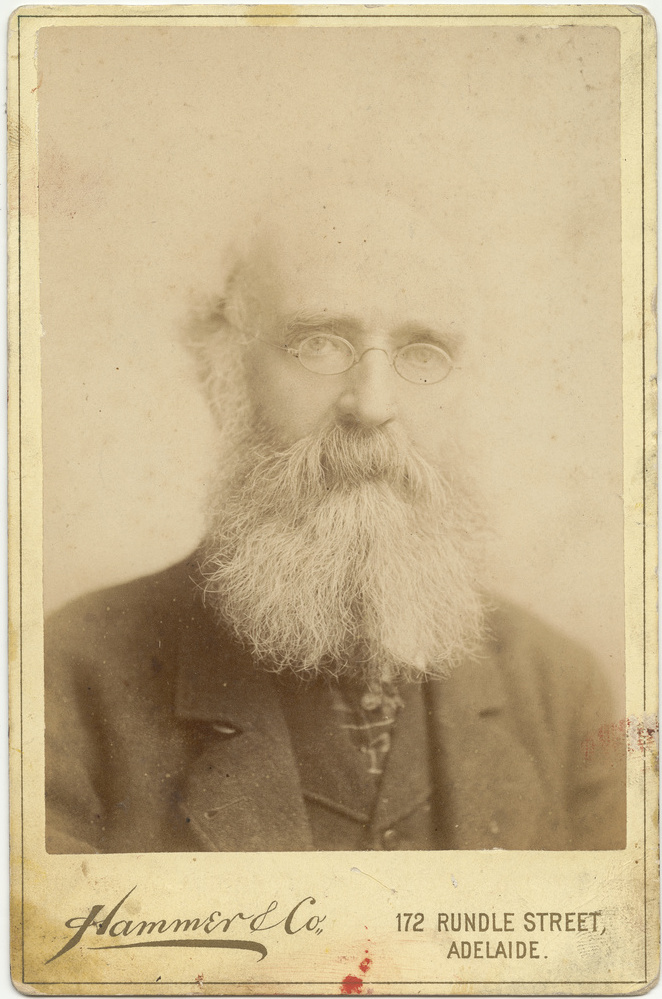
- Crawford c. 1884
- Born: c. 1829< Scotland
- Died: 30 October 1890; Norwood, South Australia
- Occupations: Photographer, Agricultural scientist
- Years active: c. 1859–1890

Frazer Smith Crawford (c. 1829 – 30 October 1890) was a photographer in the colony of South Australia, founding manager of the Adelaide Photographic Company, then photolithographer for the Government of South Australia. In a seemingly unrelated sphere, Crawford came to be recognised as an authority on agricultural pests and diseases, particularly known for identifying and exploiting naturally occurring predators of plant pests.

== History ==
Crawford was born in Scotland and emigrated, perhaps via Hobart, Tasmania, to Melbourne, Victoria sometime before 1859 and founded a business at 83 Swanston Street which provided a photographic printing service.

== Photography ==
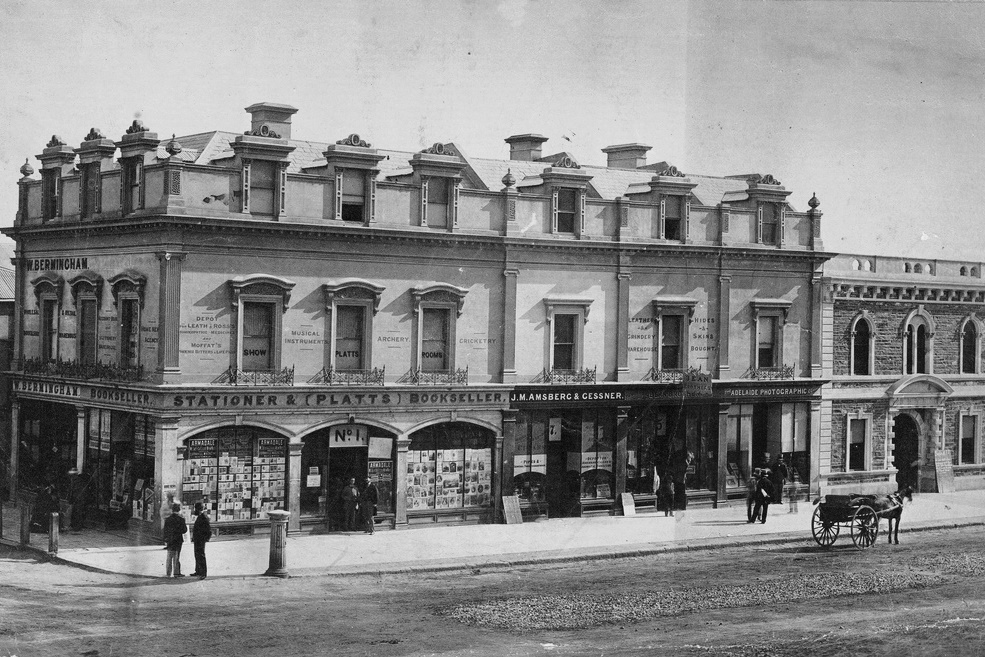
Neales' Building c. 1866. Adelaide Photographic Company at right.

Crawford was a resident of Melbourne until mid-1861, then Sydney for a year or two, before moving to Adelaide, where he had been appointed manager of Adelaide Photographic Company studio in King William Street, a little north of Hindley Street. He brought to Adelaide two notable employees: Ebenezer Cook and John A. Upton, both later acclaimed as artists. He served that company, which was for a time the chief competitor to Townsend Duryea, from 1864 to 1866, when, at the suggestion of Henry Strangways, he was appointed photolithographer to the South Australian Government's Survey and Crown Lands Department.

Management of the Adelaide Photographic Company then fell to Henry Davis, one of the proprietors of the company and previously with Batchelder & O'Neill of Collins then Swanston Street, Melbourne. He died on 6 February 1878, and management passed to his widow, Mary Jane Davis. The premises were twice severely damaged by fire: in December 1870 and in February 1879. This second fire appears to have spelled the end of the company. Eight years later the photographer Alfred Stump had the corner offices of the same building, and gave his name to the corner as a local landmark and meeting-spot.

The purpose of Crawford's appointment was to facilitate the reduction and reproduction of plans prepared by the Surveyor-General's office. Previously this work was done by hand, which was slow, expensive and error-prone. By photolithography plans or documents could be speedily reproduced at any desired (usually one-half or one-third) scale.

Crawford was first sent to study the Lands Office in Victoria, where John Walter Osborne, the pioneer of photolithography, had revolutionised the preparation and promulgation of plans. He also made a careful study of published accounts of the working of the Ordnance Survey Department in London, with the result that the Section he established was a model of efficiency and productivity. Despite his later fame and quasi-official status as an expert on pests, he remained primarily a photolithographer until his death.

He was chairman of the photographic awards jury at the 1887 Jubilee Exhibition.

== Pests of plants and fruit ==
How Crawford became known as an expert in pests of garden, farm and orchard is a bit of a mystery. He certainly had no University qualifications, but he was a careful observer, a patient researcher and described his observations clearly, avoiding technical terms when plain English would do, even inserting touches of humor. He had boundless energy and his personal circumstances and official duties clearly left him plenty of time to pursue his lines of research. And he was always prepared to change his opinions when challenged by new information. Nor did he attract professional jealousy from the academically trained, which says much for his personal qualities. He was a member of the Adelaide Philosophical Society (from 1880 the Royal Society of South Australia) and a corresponding member of the SA Garden Society. He clearly had access to some excellent microscopes and a scientific library. Among the pests he studied were:

Anguillula tritici

Now named Anguina tritici, it is a nematode that caused diseases in wheat and rye known as "ear-cockle", purples, or peppercorn. As the nematode, once it emerges from the ear of grain, lives in the ground close to the stalk, Crawford was interested in determining whether it could be controlled by burning stubble, and whether it could survive on native grass; and whether if cattle were used to keep the grass down, if it would be injurious to the cattle.

Phytoptus pyri

Now named Eriophyes pyri, it was known as pear-leaf mite or pear-leaf blister mite. His writing on this pest are clear, admitting huge gaps in knowledge and suggesting further avenues of research.

Fusicladium dendriticum and Fusicladium pyrorum

Now named Venturia inaequalis and Venturia pyrina, these fungi are known as the 'scab' of leaves and fruit of the apple and pear, and at one time as "fire blight". Crawford began studying these pests in 1886, investigating the susceptibility of different fruit varieties. He found another related species, hitherto undescribed. Apple scab was an increasingly serious pest of orchards of the Adelaide Hills, but curiously not a problem on the plains. Experimenters, notably Manning of Hobart in 1875, and Sir Robert Ross and Thomas Pugh locally, made successful experiments with iron sulphate sprayed on the tree and applied to the ground. Crawford wrote an article on the pests which appeared in the (Adelaide) Garden and Field of April 1888. An extensive article, largely based on his work, appeared posthumously in 1891.

Icerya purchasi

Cottony cushion mite (also known as "Australian bug" or "fluted scale") was a pest that made significant inroads into orange groves of South Africa (then known as Cape Colony) and California, and for which the only known control was wholesale destruction of infested trees.

Crawford was aware of the existence of this pest in South Australia, but only as a minor nuisance. He discovered a parasitic dipterous fly, Cryptochetum iceryae, for a time called Leptophonus crawfordii in his honour, which deposited eggs within the bodies of the Icerya, and the larvae devoured their hosts. In 1887, with considerable effort, Crawford sent drawings and live samples of this insect to both the California Inspector of Fruit Pests Waldemar G. Klee, and to the head of the Entomological Section of the US Department of Agriculture, Charles Valentine Riley, who after initial skepticism in 1888 sent Albert Koebele to Adelaide to collect the dipterids, and to Auckland, New Zealand, to collect numbers of vedalia beetle (Rodolia cardinalis). This ladybird had been recognised by W. M. Maskell as feeding specifically on Icerya, and so kept their number in some kind of balance. Koebele sent a large number of both enemies of the Icerya to California, where they were let loose among the orchards, which were within six months cleared of the Icerya. A dispute arose in America between Koebele and Riley as to whom the credit for controlling Icerya belonged. But the live insects Crawford had sent to Klee (later author of A Treatise on the Insects Injurious to Fruit and Fruit Trees of the State of California) had already been successfully bred and released, and made inroads into the Icerya when Koebele returned with his Vedalia (his flies may have perished) so perhaps Klee should have been given more credit. Crawford's advice had initiated an entirely new way of dealing with horticultural pests, and saved a Californian industry.

Helminthosporium rhabdiferum and Phyllosticta circumscissa

Crawford discovered there was some local confusion between the fungi, and what had been labelled Phyllosticta causing shot-hole on apricot leaves and Helminthosporium causing a pustular disease on the fruit, appeared to be one and the same species.

== Personal ==
Crawford never married; he lived alone apart from a young man-servant in Edward Street, Norwood, where he had a productive garden.

He was still in good health and productively employed in October 1890, and had recently been mentioned as the probable successor of A. Molineaux as secretary to the Agricultural Bureau. He died in bed, where he had just penned some twenty lines of observations and his lamp was still burning when he was found in the morning.

(At the November 1890 meeting of the S.A. Gardeners Society) The mover spoke in feeling terms of the deceased gentleman's personal character – a gentleman in the purest and most severe interpretation of the term, good-natured and liberal to a fault almost, incapable of a mean act or thought. His demise was a loss to the Australasian Colonies and to the world, and it would be next to impossible to fill his place.
