= Quintus Servinton =

1830 novel by Henry Savery

- Author: Henry Savery
- Language: English
- Genre: Novel
- Publisher: Henry Melville
- Publication date: 1830
- Publication place: Australia
- Media type: Print
- Pages: 1067

Quintus Servinton (1830) is a novel by Australian author Henry Savery. It was originally published anonymously in Hobart, Tasmania by Henry Melville publishers in three volumes, totally 1067 pages.

It is considered to be the first Australian novel, due to the location of the author and its publisher at its initial publication.

The novel was also published, in 1984, under the title The Bitter Bread of Banishment.

== Plot summary ==
This novel is a fictionalised biography of Quintus Servinton. An unnamed author meets Servinton when he is convalescing in Devonshire with a dislocated ankle. Servinton gives the author a manuscript which follows his life from just before his birth in 1772. Quintus shows early signs of great things but falls into trouble when he signs fictitious bills of exchange in order to obtain credit for his failing business ventures. He tries to flee to America but is captured, tried and sentenced to death for forgery. This sentence is then commuted to transportation to Tasmania where he attempts to conduct himself as a model prisoner.

== Critical reception ==
After the novel's publication in England in 1832 The Sydney Herald newspaper quoted from several reviews of the book oririnally published in English newspapers and magazines. The Literary Gazette called the book "A literary curiosity" while The Bath Review commented that it was "a favourable specimen of Van Diemen's Land literature, and an equally favourable specimen of Hobart Town typography." The Spectator stated that "this is no common book, and we hope that the various peculiarities attending its publication will recommend it to notice."

== Publication history ==
After the novel's initial publication in Australia it was reprinted as follows:

- 1832 Smith, Elder, England
- 1962 Jacaranda Press, Australia
- 1984 University of New South Wales Press, Australia (as The Bitter Bread of Banishment)
- 2003 Sydney University Press, Australia
- 2009 Dodo Press, UK

== Notes ==
- In 2000 the University of Sydney Library produced a digitised text of the novel based on the 1962 Jacaranda Press version.
