= Mark Jeffrey =

Australian convict (1825–1894)

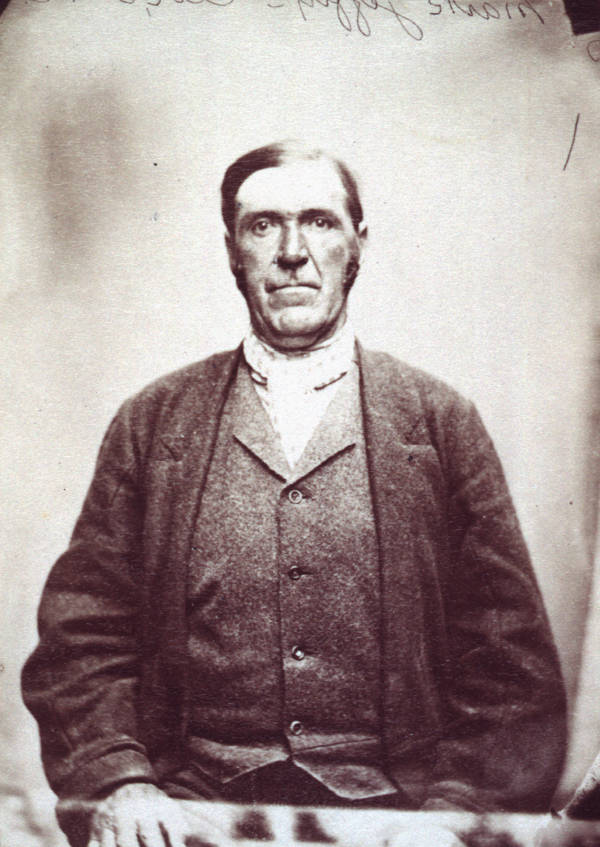
Mark Jeffrey

Mark Jeffrey (or "Big Mark") (c. 1825–1894) was an English convict who departed England on 12 December 1849 and arrived in Australia on 30 April 1850. He was described as "A terror to those in authority. He always fought against injustice...".

Jeffrey's father, John, worked for a doctor. When the doctor died, John had nowhere to live and no money, and turned to alcoholism. Mark and his younger brother Luke then took to burglary to escape their father, who severely beat them. Mark and Luke initially made good money this, though were caught after their fifteenth burglary and sentenced to fifteen years' transportation to a penal colony despite conflicting evidence, which was resolved by a man named John Hart. Mark then attempted to attack Hart in the courtroom before being restrained.

While awaiting transportation, Mark and his brother were sent to Millbank Prison, where he again met John Hart. It was then that Jeffrey's temper arose, and he spoke to Hart in such a manner that caused him to die of a heart attack without Jeffrey physically touching him. Jeffrey was charged with manslaughter, but the charges were then dropped because of his arguments that Hart brought it upon himself. While in Millbank Prison, Jeffrey was in many disputes over his rights to food and rations, but it was while awaiting transportation working in dockyards that Jeffrey found himself being severely punished after his lack of rations resulted in his violent attacks. Jeffrey became so depressed that he pleaded with the authorities to be executed.

After a long and stormy voyage on the ship Elisa, Jeffrey worked torturously on Norfolk Island before being sent to Separate Prison in Port Arthur for six months over more controversy over provisions. In 1866 Jeffrey was a free man but was unable to work because of an injury in his legs and was sentenced back to Separate Prison as an "invalid." In 1870, Jeffrey was freed again, but shortly after he was involved in a fight in a pub and convicted of manslaughter, sentencing him back into the prison in Port Arthur for life. Jeffrey spent extensive periods at a time in solitary imprisonment wearing leg-irons, which gave him shooting pain and ulcers. Jeffrey saw this as an injustice, and wrecked and smashed his prison cell and attempted to murder the doctor looking after him. The authorities at the time were exhausted by his violent outbursts and sent him to the Isle of the Dead as a gravedigger. It is thought that Jeffrey dug his own grave, which he tended, carefully patting down the sides to stop worms from invading the grave.

While living on the Isle of the Dead, Jeffrey claimed the Devil appeared and spoke to him, and requested to be removed from the island. Jeffrey was then sent to Hobart in 1877 where he continually fell victim to injustice and found himself with several more convictions of assault. Jeffrey was then transferred to the Invalid Depot at Launceston, Tasmania, where he again earned his freedom. Jeffrey became deeply religious and self-aware of his temper. Mark Jeffrey wrote an autobiography titled "A Burglar's Life," where he talked about a deep humiliation about his wasted life and hoped to "...Enter thou into the joy of the Lord."

Mark Jeffrey died in 1894 at the age of 68. According to Southern Cemeteries records, he is buried in Hobart Cornelian Bay Cemetery Site No. 516. His record of death in the Deaths of the District of Hobart lists him as: No 1216 Died 17 July 1894 in Newtown, aged 68 years, pauper, of peritonitis and tumor of the heart. His death was reported in the Launceston Examiner on Thursday, 19 July 1894, page 6.
