= Eben =

Eben is a name of Hebrew origin. It is sometimes short for Ebenezer.

The name can refer to:

== People ==
=== Given name ===
- Eben (singer) (born 1979), Nigerian gospel singer and songwriter
- Eben Alexander (author) (born 1953), American author and neurosurgeon
- Eben Alexander (educator) (1851–1910), American scholar and ambassador
- Eben Alexander Jr (1913–2004), American neurosurgeon
- Eben Allen (1868–1931), Australian politician
- Eben Barnard (born 1992), South African rugby union player
- Eben Bartlett (1912–1983), New Hampshire state representative
- Eben Edwards Beardsley (1808–1892), American Episcopal clergyman
- Eben Botha (born 1999), South African cricketer
- Eben Burgoon (born 1979), American author, cartoonist, and artist
- Eben Byers (1880–1932), American socialite, golfer and industrialist who died from drinking radioactive "medicine"
- Eben Britton (born 1987), American former National Football League player
- Eben Pomeroy Colton (1829–1895), American businessman, farmer and politician, Lieutenant Governor of Vermont
- Theophilus Ebenhaezer Eben Dönges (1898–1968), South African politician
- Eben Sumner Draper (1858–1914), American businessman and politician, 41st Governor of Massachusetts
- Eben S. Draper Jr. (1893–1959), American politician
- Ebenezer Eben Dugbatey (born 1973), Ghanaian retired footballer
- Eben Emerson, American lighthouse keeper who rescued the crew of a brig in 1865
- Eben Etzebeth (born 1991), South African rugby player
- Eben Fardd, bardic name of Ebenezer Thomas (1802–1863), Welsh poet
- Eben Ernest Hayes (1851–1933), New Zealand engineer and inventor
- Eben Hopson (1922–1980), American politician
- Eben Norton Horsford (1818–1893), American scientist known for his reformulation of baking powder
- Eben Samuel Johnson (1866–1939), English-American bishop of the Methodist Episcopal Church
- Eben Joubert (born 1983), South African rugby union player
- Eben Jenks Loomis (1828–1912), American astronomer
- Eben Martin (1855–1932), American politician
- Eben Matlis (1923–2015), mathematician
- Eben Moglen (born 1959), American law professor
- Eben Newton (1795–1885), American politician
- Eben Fiske Ostby (born 1955), American animator
- Eben Pyne (1917–2007), American soldier and banker
- Eben E. Rexford (1848–1916), American writer, poet and lyricist
- Eben Ezra Roberts (1866–1843), American architect
- Eben William Robertson (1815–1874), British historian
- Eben C. Smeed (1831–1892), American civil engineer
- Eben Smith (1832–1906), American businessman
- Eben S. Stearns (1819–1887), American educator
- Eben F. Stone (1822–1895), American politician
- Eben Swift (1854–1938), American major general
- Eben Upton (born 1978), Welsh Raspberry Pi Foundation co-founder
- Eben van Zijl (1931–2009), Namibian politician
- Eben Vorster (born 1997), South African swimmer
- Eben Gowrie Waterhouse (1881–1977), Australian language teacher and Germanist and plant breeder
- Eben Wilson (1869–1948), American college football player and head coach
- Eben Eveleth Winslow (1866–1928), U.S. Army brigadier general
- Eben Wortham (1897–1982), American football player and educator

=== Surname ===
- Baron Eben (1773–1825), Prussian military officer active in the Peninsular War
- Johannes von Eben (1855–1924), Prussian World War I general
- Mike Eben (born 1946), American former football player in the Canadian Football League
- Petr Eben (1929–2007), Czech composer, organist and choirmaster
- Eben Brothers, Czech musicians, sons of Petr Egen:
  - David Eben, (born 1957), Czech musician and musicologist
  - Kryštof Eben, (born 1957), Czech scientist and musician
  - Marek Eben (born 1957), Czech actor, singer, composer, writer and television host

== Fictional characters ==
- Eben Holden, protagonist of the 1900 novel of the same name

== See also ==
- Eban (name)
