= Henry Savery =

Australian convict novelist

- Born: 4 August 1791; Somerset, England
- Died: 6 February 1842 (aged 50); Port Arthur, Tasmania, Australia
- Occupation: Novelist

Henry Savery (4 August 1791 – 6 February 1842) was a convict transported to Port Arthur, Tasmania, and Australia's first novelist. It is generally agreed that his writing is more important for its historical value than its literary merit.

== Early life in England ==
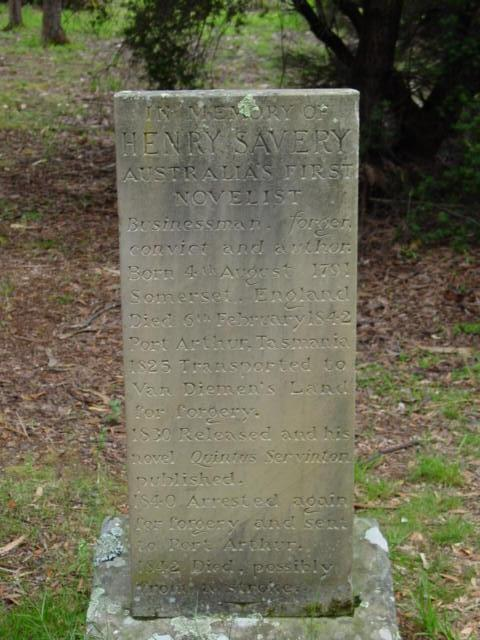
Savery's memorial stone on the Isle of the Dead at Port Arthur

Henry Savery was born in Somerset, England into the family of a wealthy banker. Little else is known of his early years. He married Eliza Elliott Oliver, daughter of a London business man, and their only son was born in 1816. Savery ran a sugar-refining business which was declared bankrupt in 1819, and had proprietorship of the newspaper The Bristol Observer for a little over two years, after which he returned to sugar refining. Having overextended the firm's commitments to his partner, he began trading in forged bills of credit which eventually amounted to over £30,000. His partner called the authorities when he absconded with £1500. He was arrested on 9 December, having jumped from a boat that was to take him to America. While in prison his behaviour was so erratic that his trial had to be postponed. On 2 April 1825, he pleaded guilty and was sentenced to hang on the 22nd of the same month. Through influential friends this was commuted to transportation, only a day before his execution was due. Sometime in August he departed England for the last time on the ship Medway with 171 other convicts.

== Transported to Van Diemen's Land ==
Arriving in Hobart, Van Diemen's Land, at the end of 1825, Savery was retained in government service and worked for the Colonial Treasurer, an appointment which caused controversy among other colonists. In 1828 his wife and son came to the colony, and arguments between them culminated in his attempted suicide. There had been rumours about Eliza's conduct with the colony's Attorney General, her chaperone, during the journey from England. She may have also been angered that Savery's letters to her had exaggerated his position in the colony. Soon after, he was imprisoned for debt and Eliza took their son back to England within three months. They never saw each other again.

In prison, Savery wrote a series of sketches of activities and personages in the colony. These were published in the Colonial Times and, after settling a libel suit, collected in the book The Hermit of Van Diemen's Land (1829). This occurred under the pseudonym 'Simon Stukeley' as a convict could be sent to the far harsher Macquarie Harbour Penal Station for being published. It is only through a note in his publisher Henry Melville's own copy of the book that we know of Savery's authorship. Savery wrote his novel during his assignment to the household of Major Hugh Macintosh, one of the two founders of Cascade Brewery. He was given permission to reside at Major Macintosh's Lawn Farm on the banks of the Derwent River, about six kilometers down stream from New Norfolk, on the condition that he not carry on his own business. Macintosh and Savery appeared to have established a friendship prior to his assignment and Savery was soon managing Lawn Farm for Macintosh, whilst also being given time to write Quintus Servinton. After Macintosh's death in December 1834, Savery remained at Lawn Farm as manager for at least another four years.

Quintus Servinton: A Tale founded upon Incidents of Real Occurrence was published anonymously in 1831 to reasonably good reviews from the colonial press. Savery's authorship became a public secret and was even mentioned in a reference for his ticket of leave which was granted in 1832. Unfortunately his relative freedom was quickly revoked because of his writing, in this case for the paper The Tasmanian. The suspension was itself suspended when it turned out the charge was a pretext for tarring the reputation of Governor Arthur. Savery's illegal authorship was thereafter quietly ignored.

Less is known about Savery's final years, though he gained a provisional pardon. He fell into debt again and possibly alcoholism. By 1839 he was refused a convict servant. Towards the end of 1840 he was again charged with forging bills. Brought before the magistrate who had chaperoned his wife, he was again sentenced to transportation to Port Arthur where, early in 1842, he died possibly after slitting his own throat. He was buried on the Isle of the Dead just off the coast of the prison.

== Bibliography ==
- Henry Savery: The Hermit in Van Diemen's Land. Ed. Cecil Hadgraft & Margaret Roe (1829; UQP, 1964)
- Quintus Servinton (1830; Henry Melville)
- Australia's First Two Novels: Origins and background. E. Morris Miller (Hobart, 1958)
- "A Forger's Tale: The Extraordinary Story of Henry Savery, Australia's First Novelist". Rod Howard (Arcade Publications, Melbourne, 2011)

== See also ==
- List of convicts transported to Australia
