= Isle of the Dead (Tasmania) =

Island adjacent to Port Arthur, Tasmania

Isle of the Dead, Port Arthur
- IUCN category V (protected landscape/seascape)
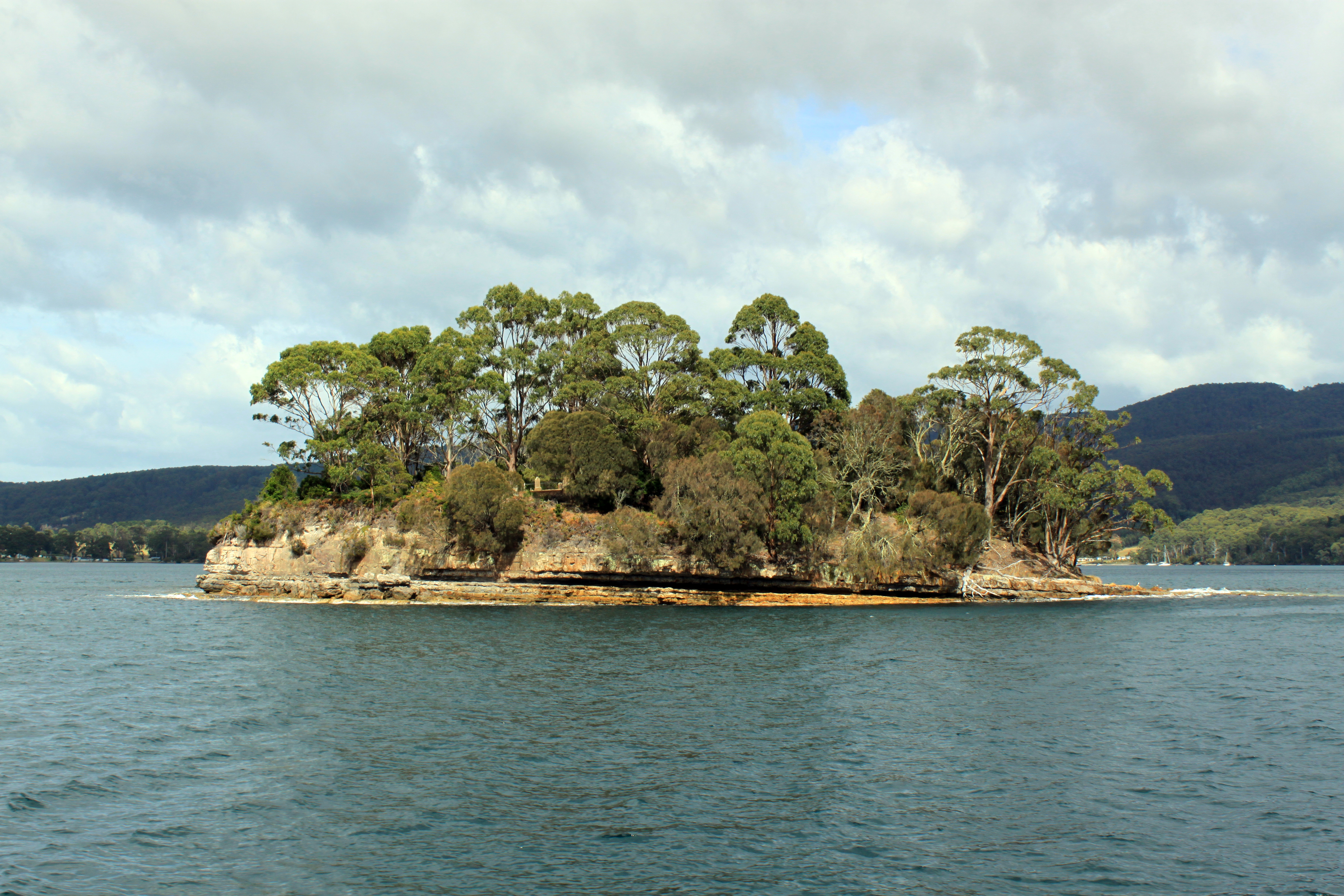
- Isle of the Dead, Port Arthur, Tasmania, Australia

- Location within Tasmania
- Location: Tasmania, Port Arthur, Tasmania
- Nearest city: Highcroft
- Coordinates: 43°08′57″S 147°52′03″E
- Area: 0.1 km^{2} (0.039 sq mi)
- Established: cemetery 1833
- Governing body: Port Arthur Historic Site Management Authority
- Website: Official website

Designations

UNESCO World Heritage Site
- Type: Cultural
- Criteria: iv, v
- Designated: 2010
- Part of: Australian Convict Sites
- Reference no.: 1306-008

Australian National Heritage List
- Official name: Port Arthur Historic Site
- Type: Historic
- Criteria: a,b,c,d,e,g,h
- Designated: 3 June 2005
- Reference no.: 105718

Tasmanian Heritage Register
- Official name: Port Arthur Penal Settlement
- Type: Historic cultural heritage
- Criteria: 6
- Designated: 1995

Isle of the Dead is an island, about 1 hectare (2.5 acres) in area, adjacent to Port Arthur, Tasmania, Australia. It is historically significant since it retains an Aboriginal coastal shell midden, one of the first recorded sea-level benchmarks, and one of the few preserved Australian convict-period burial grounds. The Isle of the Dead occupies part of the Port Arthur Historic Site, is part of Australian Convict Sites and is listed as a World Heritage Property because it represents convictism in the era of British colonisation.

Before European settlement, Aboriginal people gathered food on the island. From 1833 the island was used as a cemetery for convicts and free people of the Port Arthur penal settlement.

The Isle of the Dead was the destination for all who died inside the prison camps. Of the 1,000 estimated graves recorded to exist there, only 180, those of prison staff and military personnel, were marked. The cemetery was closed following the demise of the Port Arthur settlement in 1877 and the island was sold as private land. It was reacquired and managed by the Tasmanian government from the early twentieth century.

Over the last century tourism has grown with improved services and infrastructure. Increased conservation initiatives have been undertaken to preserve the island and its relics, resulting in the island being declared a cultural heritage property and protected under Australian state and federal laws. It is also listed under UNESCO's world heritage sites.

== Location ==
Isle of the Dead is an approximately 10,000 square metres (1 hectare) island within Carnarvon Bay at the northern tip of Point Puer on the Southern Tasman Peninsula in the Island State of Tasmania, Australia. It is approximately 98 kilometres (61 miles) southeast of the state capital, Hobart. Driving from Hobart, via the Tasman Highway /A3, the Arthur Highway /A9 to Port Arthur Historic Site takes around 80 minutes. Isle of the Dead is approximately 700 metres (0.43 miles) from Point Puer. It is 1.2 km (3/4 of a mile) from Mason Cove. It is only accessible by boat and Port Arthur Historic Site offers guided ferry tours to the island.

== Aboriginal shell midden ==
Original inhabitants of this area were the Pydairrerme people, a band of the Oyster Bay tribe. Prior to the 1830s, local Aboriginal people used the island to gather shellfish and camp. Isle of the Dead retains a large midden. The midden contains shells and the remains of campfires (charcoal and ash), evidence of past Aboriginal people visiting the isle to gather shellfish and molluscs such as abalone and mussels. It is located under an overhanging cliff and rock platform, which was used for shelter. This midden is defined as an Aboriginal relic and is protected under the Aboriginal Heritage Act 1975.

== Naming the Isle ==
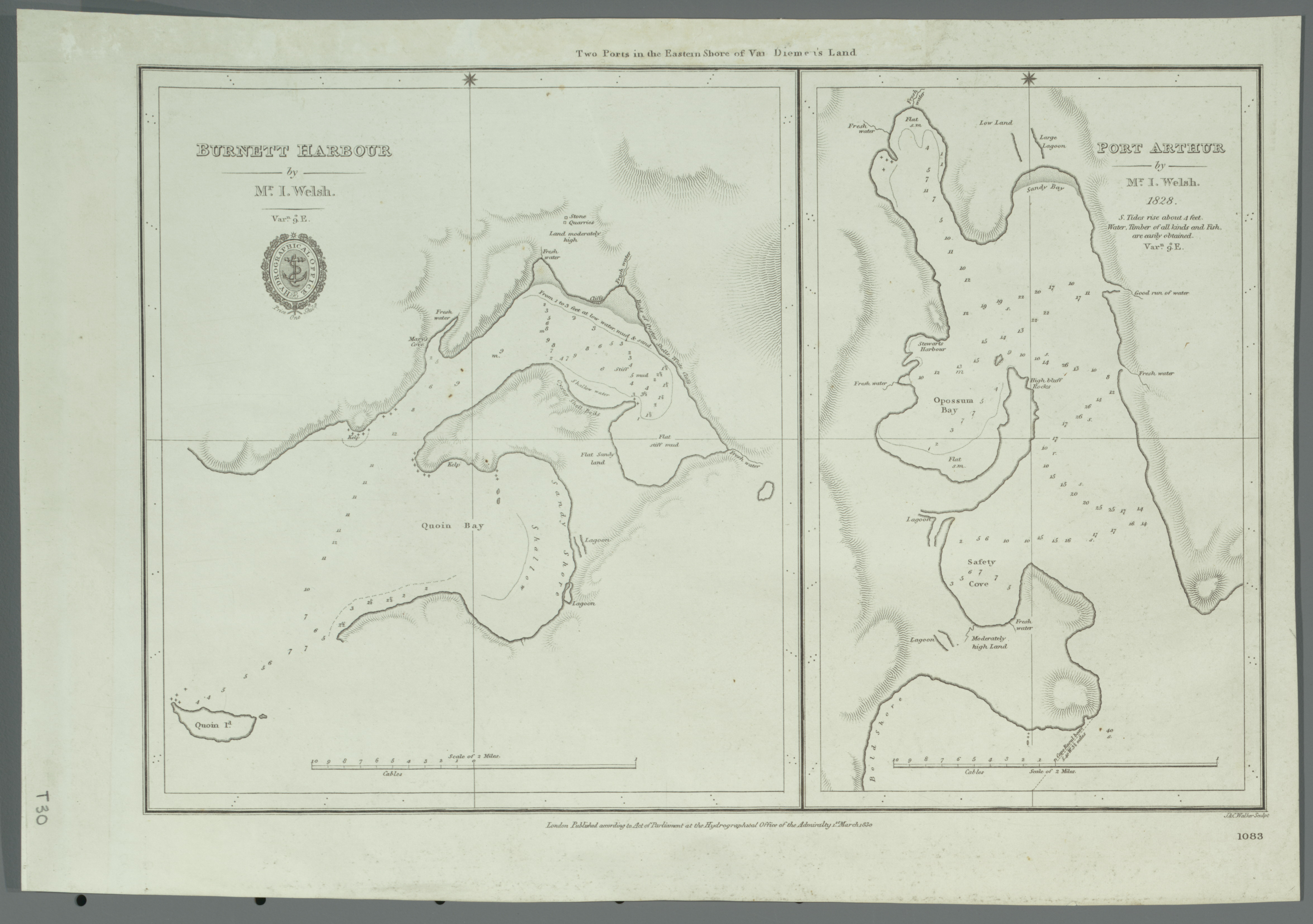
Captain John Welsh's surveying map of Port Arthur and Isle of the Dead (dated 1828). Admiralty Chart No 1083, published 1830.

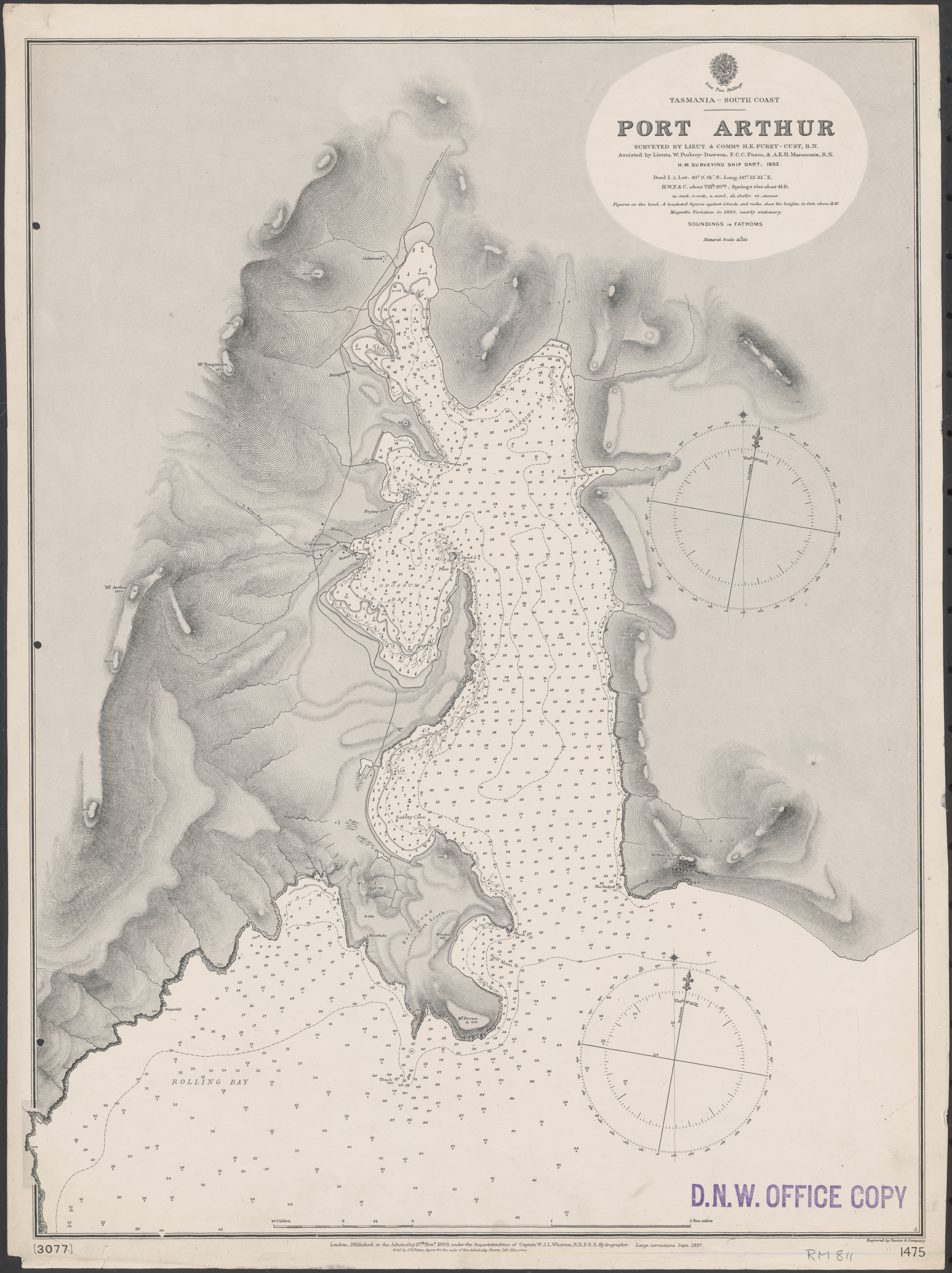
Admiralty Chart No.1475. Hydrographic survey of "Dead Island" and Port Arthur, Tasmania, 1893.

With the arrival of settler colonialism, the isle was called Opossum Island in 1827. It was named after Captain John Welsh's sloop Opossum while seeking shelter nearby when surveying the harbours on the Tasman Peninsula.

Reverend John Allen Manton, an English Wesleyan missionary, arrived in February 1833 as first chaplain for the Port Arthur settlement. He wrote in a religious pamphlet that he selected this isle for a cemetery, as it was close to the colony, "a secure and undisturbed resting-place" and renamed "Isle of the Dead" for its purpose as a burial place. The isle was recorded as "Dead Island" in a hydrographic survey undertaken from the surveying ship HMS Dart in 1893 and published as Admiralty chart 1475. The Island was also known as "Isle des Morts" and "Dead Men's Isle".

== Cemetery for penal colony ==
=== Penal settlement usage ===
The isle was used as a cemetery for the penal settlement of Port Arthur from September 1833 to 1877. This included the Point Puer boys' prison, which operated from January 1834 until 1849. There were also a small number of burials from the military posting at Eaglehawk Neck and from the Coal Mines (Coal Mines Historic Site), which operated from 1833 to 1848. The colony experienced population decline following the closure of Point Puer boys' prison in 1849, the end of convict transportation to Tasmania in 1853, and the departure of the military in 1863. The cemetery continued to be used for destitute, aged and infirm men, mainly convicts and ex convicts, residing in Port Arthur's welfare institutions, the hospital, Paupers' (invalid) Depot (established in 1864) and Lunatic Asylum (established in 1867) until they were closed in 1877.

=== Burial designation ===
The cemetery was divided into designated sections. Convicts were buried on the lower, southern end of the island. No headstones or markings were placed on convict graves, as they were not allowed. Alfred Mawle, a tour guide for Port Arthur from about 1899 to 1939, described that convict graves were marked with small metal numbers, which went missing in the 1920s.

Free people were located on the northern western corner of the island and their graves were generally marked with footstones, headstones and tombstones cut by convict stonemasons. Approximately eighty-one headstones and five footstones, dated from 1831 to 1877, were identified and inscriptions recorded in the late 1970s. Of these, four belonged to former convicts who were free at the time of their deaths and nine were erected as memorials to convicts after the closure of the penal colony. It is estimated that less than 10% of all the burials on the Isle of Dead were formally marked.

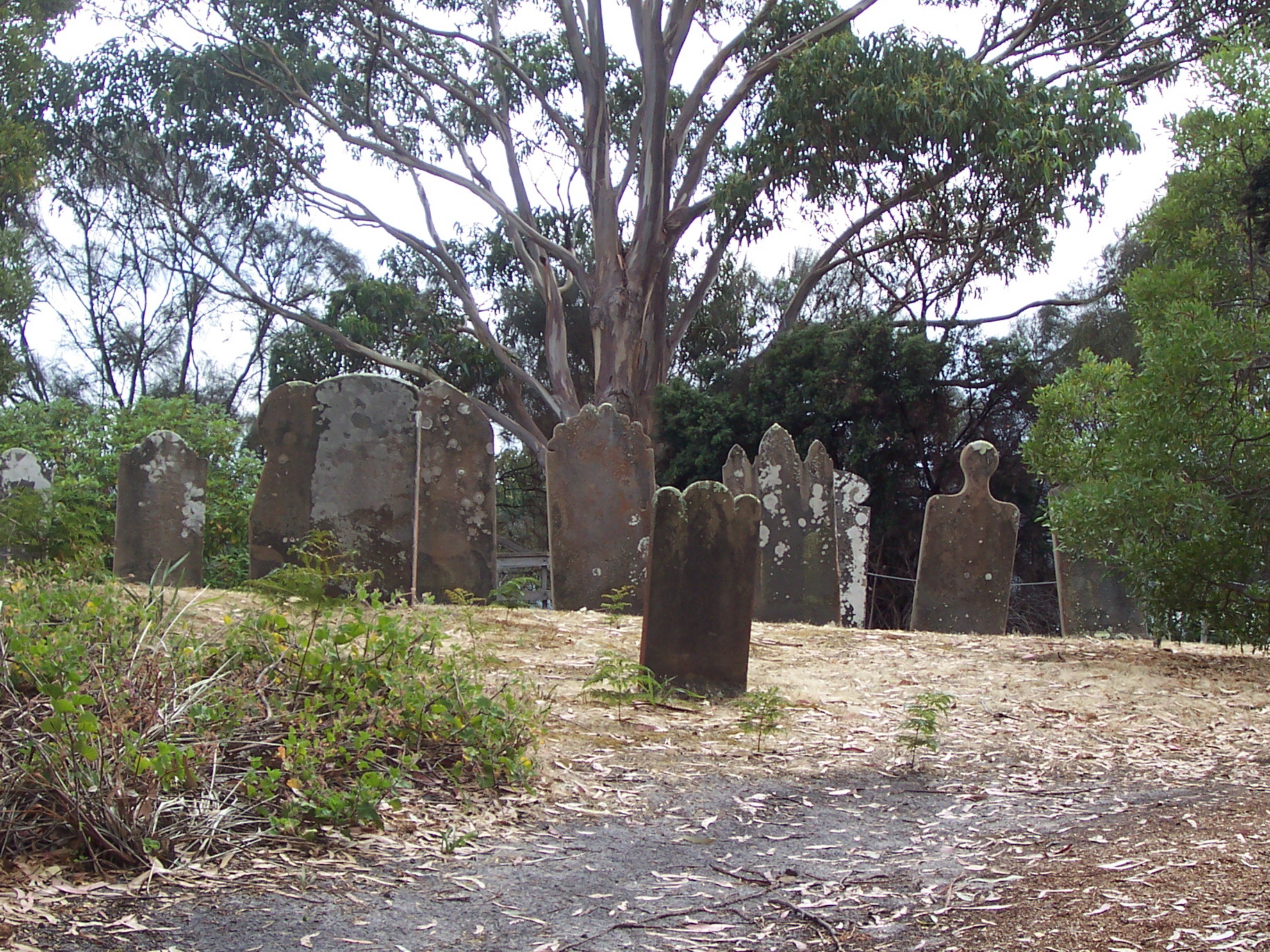
Gravestones on the Isle of the Dead

=== Number of burials ===
Approximately 1,000 people have been buried on the Isle of the Dead. The actual number of people buried on the island is unknown because of the destruction of many official records, incomplete burial records and lack of records for free people located at Port Arthur and the outstations. Estimates of the number buried is based on geophysical studies, remaining burial and death records and the limited size of the convict burial section on the isle.

Historical estimates have been variable. The Hobart Town Courier published 43 burials on the isle in 1836. The Tasmanian reported 1,500 graves in 1872. 1,500 graves were recorded again on an "Isle of the Dead" tourist postcard in 1909. In 1907 an Australian Town and Country Journal article about convict burials across the Tasman Peninsula cited 1,700 convict burials on the isle.

=== Burial records ===
The Wesleyan mission conducted all the religious duties, including the burial services on the Isle of the Dead and recorded them in a burial register from 1833 to 1843. The register shows that in the cemetery's first decade, 90% of burials were convicts and 90% were younger than 40 years old of which 39 were children from Point Puer boys' reformatory prison. Over 50% of the convicts buried were labourers with the remaining mostly shoemakers, carpenters and sawyers for the timber industry. Free people buried on the island were 1 government official, 7 soldiers, 7 seamen, an officer's wife and 9 children.

The Wesleyan burial register indicates that four women were buried on the island. In addition to this number, an elderly aboriginal woman may also have been buried on the isle in 1833. In a diary entry by Lady Jane Franklin, she describes the elder dying while journeying on the government brig, Tamar, on its way to Hobart, and her burial undertaken during the boat's layover at Port Arthur. Catholic and Church of England ministers replaced the Wesleyan missionary in 1843. The only remaining burial record from 1843 to the closure of the cemetery are the Church of England's register kept from 1850 to 1864.

=== Causes of death ===
From the existing records most burials on the Isle of the Dead were a result of death caused by disease. Convicts arrived to the colony from the unsanitary and overcrowded conditions of the hulks and gaols and experienced nutritional deficiency. In the early years illness such as dysentery, enteritis and fever were the main causes of death followed by respiratory disease and epidemics spreading through the colony. There were also a significant number of deaths from accidents, murder and suicide.

=== Gravediggers ===
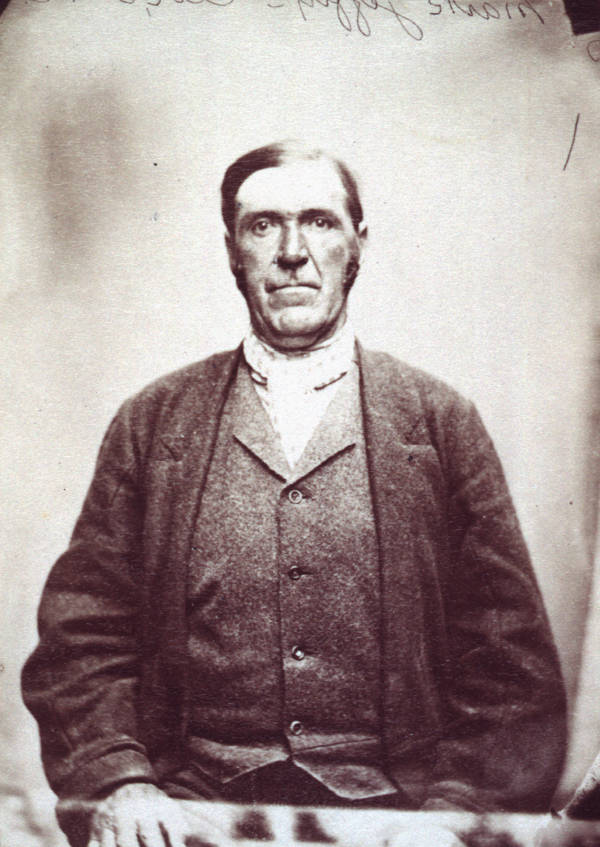
Mark Jeffrey (1825–1894). Convict gravedigger for Isle of the Dead, who wrote a published autobiography about his life, including his time as a prisoner in Port Arthur.

There are two known gravediggers who lived and worked on the Isle of the Dead during its time as a penal colony. The first was John Barron, an Irish convict who lived and worked on the island for more than 10 years until pardoned in 1874. The second was Mark Jeffrey, an English convict who volunteered for the job as gravedigger and lived on the isle from Mondays to Saturdays and returned to the Port Arthur settlement to attend Sunday church services. He was the gravedigger until the penal colony's closure in April 1877, then transferred to Hobart Town prison.

=== Structures ===
The Isle of the Dead had two shelters that were constructed during its period as a penal cemetery: the gravedigger's residence which was a weatherboard hut with a wood shingled roof and brick chimney; and a shelter for funeral parties which was a latticework-sided shed located near the jetty.

== Sea level benchmark ==
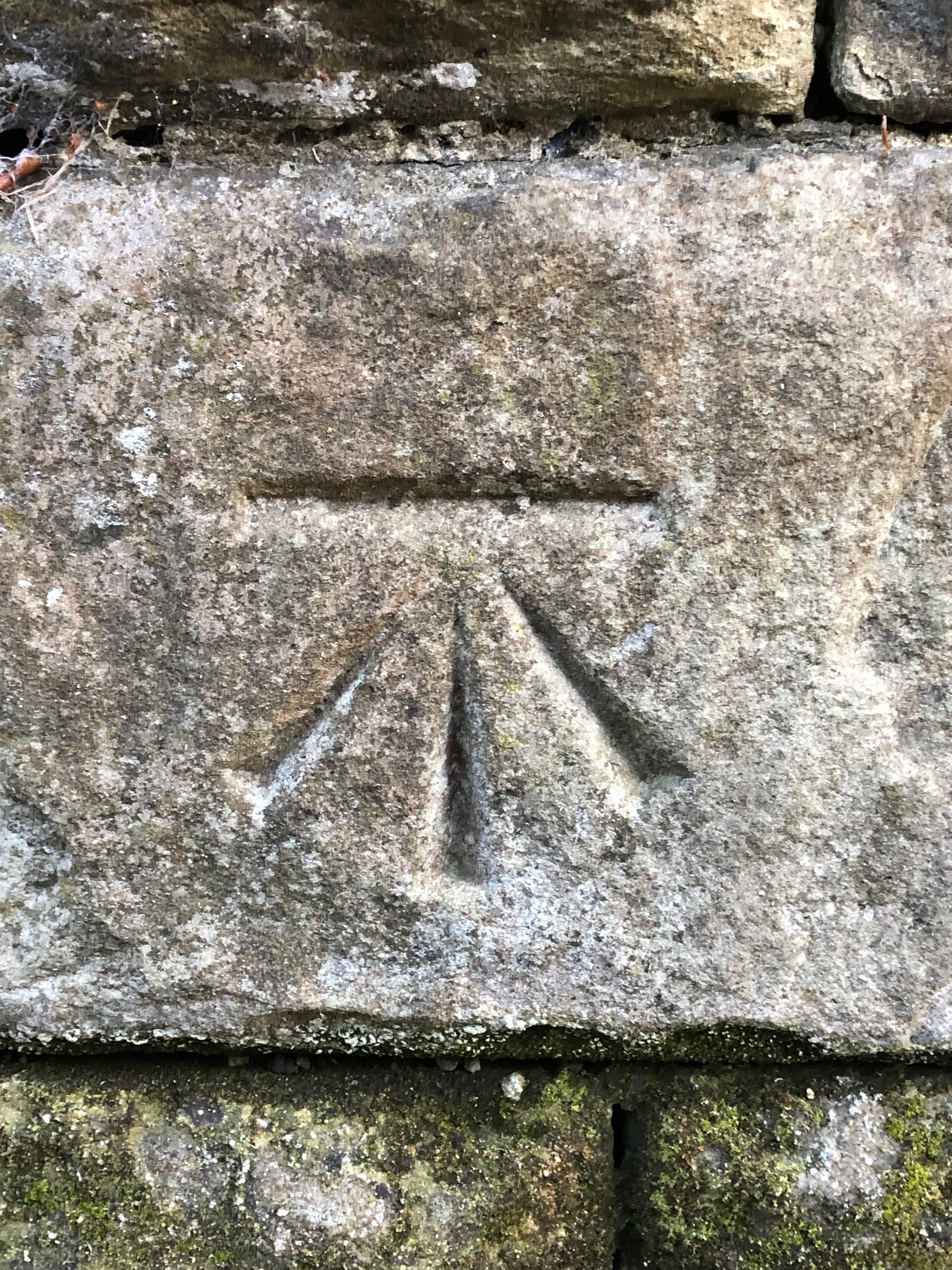
An example of a naval ordinance surveying benchmark carved into rock. Located in Scarborough, United Kingdom.

In 1841 Captain James Clark Ross, on his Southern Antarctic expedition, undertook scientific excursions on the Tasman Peninsula. Accompanied by Lieutenant-Governor John Franklin, he visited Port Arthur. One reason for this visit was to establish a permanent sea level benchmark based on tidal observations initiated by Franklin and continued by Thomas James Lempriere, Deputy Assistant Commissary General of Port Arthur.

Lempriere had taken on the duties of recording meteorological and tidal observations following the drowning of the Surveyor for the Royal Navy, Lieutenant Thomas Burnett in May 1837. He recorded observations with a thermometer, water barometer, rain and tide gauge from 1 July 1837 to 30 June 1841. These charts were then sent to the Royal Society through the Colonial Office.

Captain Ross describes in his book, A Voyage of Discovery and Research in the Southern and Antarctic Regions during the Years 1839–43, that the Isle of the Dead was chosen for the placement of the benchmark as it was near to the tide register. The benchmark was then struck following Franklin giving Lempriere the workers he needed to have the mark cut deeply in the rock where Lempriere's "tidal observations indicated as the mean level of the ocean".

The benchmark was carved into a north facing vertical rock on the Isle of the Dead on 1 July 1841. The standard British ordnance survey benchmark of a broad arrow was used with the horizontal line measuring 50 cm across. A small stone tablet was also installed above the benchmark recording the date the benchmark was struck and the measurements used to determine its position. The tablet remained until the early 20th century when it was reported missing.

The Isle of the Dead benchmark, including the related surviving records up until 1848, were placed on the Australian National Heritage List in June 2005 for having "exceptional historical and scientific significance in the international field of climate research".

The benchmark is believed to be one of the oldest sea level benchmarks installed in the world. It is one of the first and few remaining early sea level measurements in existence in the Southern Hemisphere. It is also estimated to be the first benchmark made to measure "relative land-sea vertical movements at an ocean site". The Isle of the Dead sea level benchmark together with Lempriere's records and those taken since that time, cover the longest time span of any sea level observations in the Southern Hemisphere.

== Early accounts ==
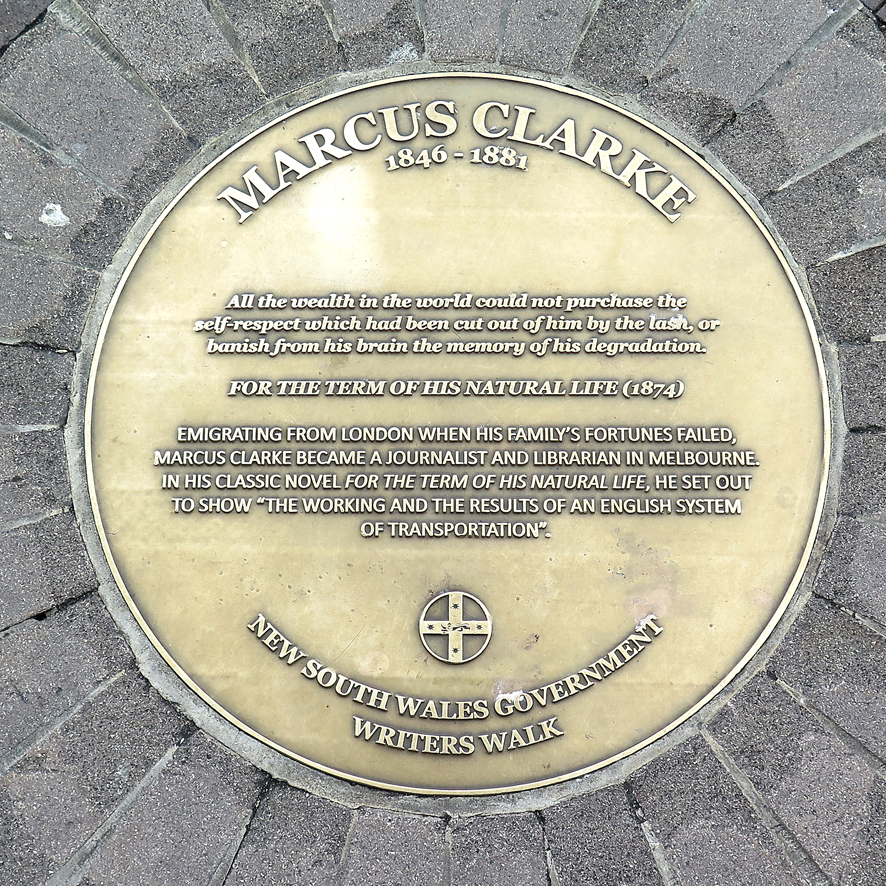
Sydney Writers Walk plaque commemorating Marcus Clarke's novel For the Term of His Natural Life

Port Arthur and the surrounding areas and waterways were closed to the public during its time as a penal colony. Visits were expensive and could be made with government approval.

David Burn, a Scottish settler and author, was granted permission to visit by the Colonial Secretary. He arrived by government vessel and was taken on a tour conducted by the commandant of the colony, Charles O'Hara Booth in January 1842. His account of his visit titled An Excursion to Port Arthur in 1842 was published in 1853 and describes the isle "picturesquely sorrowful… soothing in its melancholy". Burn recounts the stories of a number of people buried on the isle including the first buried convict, Dennis Collins and his meeting in the hospital with author and convict, Henry Savery who was later buried on Isle of the Dead.

Marcus Clarke, journalist and author, visited Port Arthur colony in 1870. Approaching by boat he "beheld barring… passage to the prison the low grey hummocks of the Isle of the Dead". His book titled For the Term of His Natural Life was published in 1872 and reflects his research on convictism from this trip and includes the Isle of the Dead as one of its locations. This book was made into a number of films and Port Arthur was used as a filming location in 1908 and 1926.

Anthony Trollope, an English author, visited the Isle of the Dead in 1872. His book titled Australia and New Zealand published in 1873, describes the isle and his meeting with convict gravedigger John Barren.

Mark Jeffrey, an English convict, was an Isle of the Dead gravedigger. Following release from prison on a ticket of leave and due to ill health and poverty he was transferred to the Invalid Depot in Launceston, Tasmania. From here, Jeffrey, being illiterate, narrated his life story including his time at Port Arthur colony, which was published in a book in 1893 and 1900, titled A Burglar's Life; or the Stirring Adventures of the Great English Burglar, Mark Jeffrey: A thrilling history of the dark days of convictism in Australia.

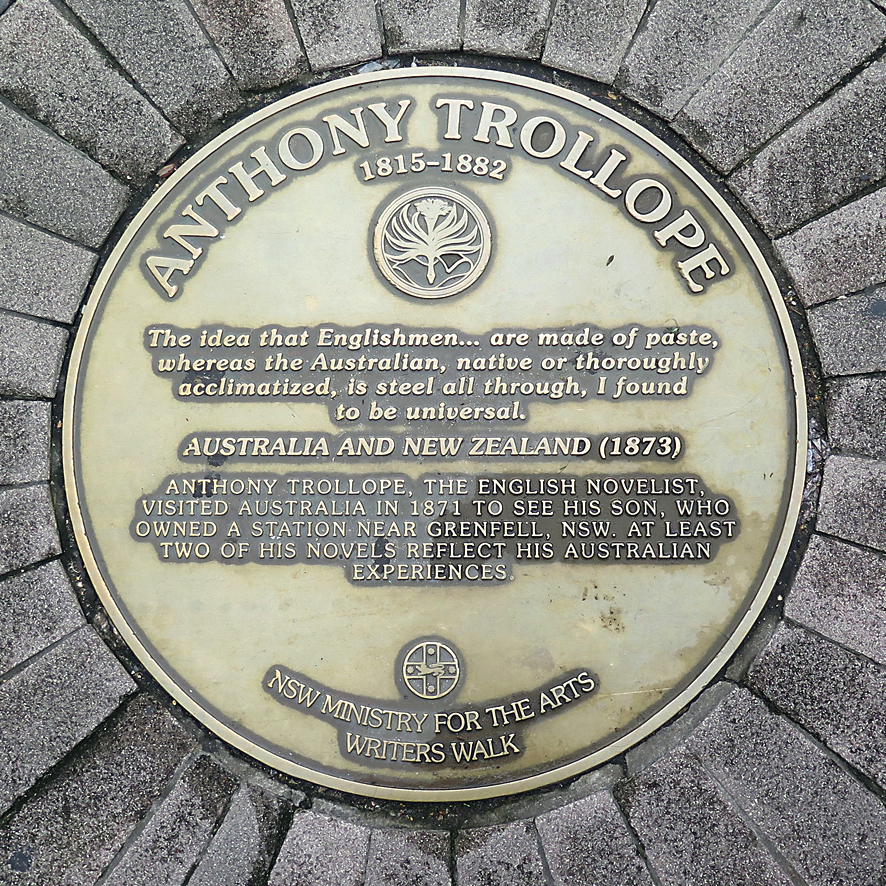
Sydney Writers Walk plaque commemorating Anthony Trollope's book Australia and New Zealand

== Conservation and tourism ==
=== Early tourism ===
Tourism began within six months of Port Arthur's closure as a penal settlement in 1877. By 1880 Port Arthur had a tourist centre running organised tours. It grew gradually from local people to arrivals from Melbourne and Sydney. By the 1890s tourist excursions were being regularly run in summer by steamship companies departing from Hobart, Melbourne and Sydney as land infrastructure was not fully developed. Despite tourism growth to Port Arthur, visits to Isle of the Dead were reduced as it was offshore and required the hiring of a boat.

Material remains of historical tourism is evident by a watercolour of Isle of the Dead by Ebenezer Wake Cook, commissioned by the Duke of Edinburgh during his visit to Tasmania in January 1868. It is also seen in photographic postcards, from 1905 by photographers such as John Watt Beattie, and postcards printed from 1905 to 1921 by J. Walch and Son. McVitty and W.J. Little. The first image recorded of Isle of the Dead was by Catherine Augusta Mitchell who pencilled a sketch of her children's burial place around 1845.

In 1887 Isle of the Dead together with Point Puer were sold as private land to Thomas White as Lot 7378 until acquired by the Tasmanian government in 1915. It is unknown what the isle was used for during this time. Point Puer, part of the same allotment, was used for farming purposes until the 1960s.

=== Erosion and vandalism ===
Damage has occurred to the island from erosion. In 1879 a large part of the isle collapsed on the eastern side leaving graves exposed at the cliff edge. Government grants to restore gravestones and remove overgrowth in 1892 and the removal of almost all vegetation in 1933 exposed the isle to weather causing severe erosion to the island and cemetery. From 1938 a memorial garden was established using native and exotic plants and headstones were repaired with cement.

Destruction also occurred from recurring vandalism to the cemetery's monuments. Tourists arrived by steamship on cheap day tickets and removed relics as souvenirs. This was able to continue, as there was a general lack of funds and protective measures in place, until the 1970s.

=== Conservation and tourism development ===
In 1916 the Tasmanian government established the Scenery Preservation Board, which acquired Isle of the Dead and listed it as a Scenic Reserve. With a rapid increase in tourism following World War II, this board established the Port Arthur Scenic Reserves Board, which developed a scenic attraction by clearing overgrowth and planting trees. The National Parks and Wildlife Service (NPWS) took over the management of the isle in 1971 and introduced conservation methods to minimise further erosion by removing exotic species and planting native trees to act as wind breaks to protect the headstones. They also restored monuments with concrete and mortar.

From the 1970s tourism was promoted through "Isle of Dead Tours" facilitated by a new jetty and boat trip on the O'Hara Booth departing from Port Arthur's Mason Cove. These tours were not guided and attempts to limit tourist movements were made by pathways and chains around headstones.

The Port Arthur Historic Site Management Authority (PAHSMA) has managed the Isle of the Dead from 1987. PAHSMA receives government funding and generates further revenue through tourism. This revenue has funded conservation and heritage activities such as: maritime research uncovering artefacts of convict boat transport, old jetty and moorings on the Isle of the Dead's coastline; monitoring headstone deterioration and restorations; and, geophysical investigations of the layout and physical characteristics of the burial ground.

Conservation schemes have focused on minimising the impact of tourism on the cemetery by construction of barriers and walkways. Limiting access by offering only guided tours and alternative activities such as boat only trips and night-time tours of Point Arthur. At the same time, funding projects have increased tourist accessibility through building new jetties at Mason Cove and Isle of the Dead and improving walkways and viewing platforms.

PAHSMA, under its conservation aims, succeeded in having Isle of the Dead, as part of the Port Arthur Historic Site, inscribed on the Tasmanian Heritage Register in 1995 and Australian National Heritage List in 2005 for its historic and cultural significance, giving it protection under the Environment and Protection and Biodiversity and Conservation Act 1999. PAHSMA also succeeded in having the site listed with UNESCO as a World Heritage Property on 31 July 2010 making it one of 11 Australian Convict Sites representing convictism and its development in the punishment of crime.

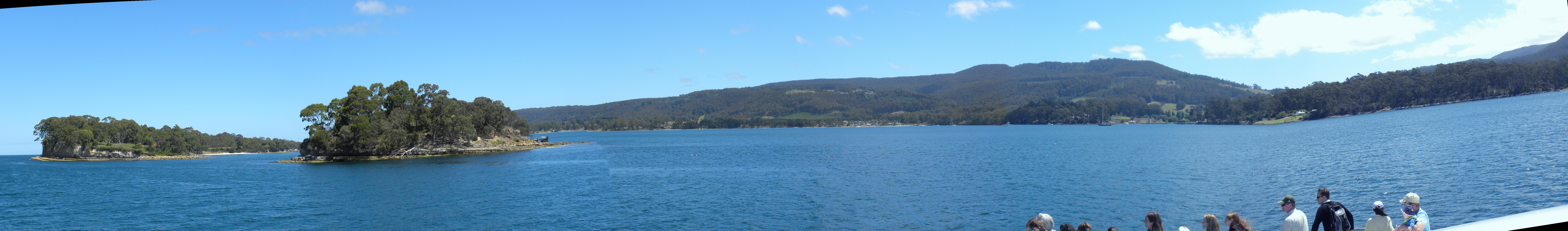
Panoramic view of Isle of the Dead, 2011.

== Graves ==
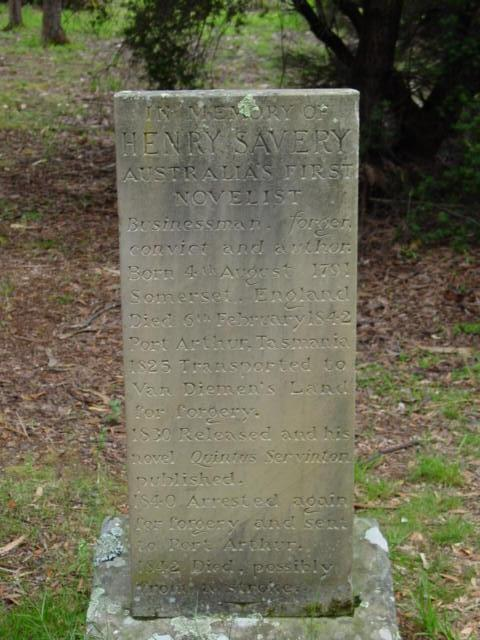
Henry Savery (1791–1842) Memorial Stone, Isle of the Dead

- Collins, Dennis (? – 1833). Convict buried in 1833 aged 58. He was an English disabled pauper and retired sailor, transported for life for throwing a stone at the King. His cause of death was suicide by refusing food.
- Eastman, Reverend George (? – 25 April 1870). He was the Church of England chaplain for the Port Arthur penal colony from January 1855 to April 1870. He was known as the "good parson" and in April 1870, although unwell with a cold, visited an ill convict in an outstation. He died two days later and was interred in a raised sandstone vault on 28 April 1870. The inscription on the vault marks his age as 51 years old and the Port Arthur burial register records his age as 50 years old. Following his death the local diocese ran an appeal for his wife and 10 children.
- Savery, Henry (1791–1842). A convict and Australia's first novelist with The Hermit of Van Dieman's Land, published under a pseudonym in 1829, and Quintus Servinton, published in 1831. He was buried on Isle of the Dead in 1842. A memorial plaque was placed over his grave in 1978 and in 1992 the Fellowship of Australian Writers replaced the plaque with a memorial stone marking the 150th anniversary of Savery's death. The stone's inscription describes his book, crimes of forgery, imprisonment and death.

== See also ==
- Conservation and restoration of cultural heritage
- Protected areas of Tasmania
- Newlyn Tidal Observatory - tidal datum for Britain

== Bibliography ==
- Bateson, C. (1969) The Convict Ships 1787- 7869, 2nd ed. Glasgow, Brown Son & Ferguson Ltd, ISBN 978-0-85174-195-6 cited in Ross, L. (1995). Death and Burial at Port Arthur, 1830–1877 (honours thesis). University of Tasmania, Hobart, Tasmania, p. 42. Retrieved 2020-04-09 https://eprints.utas.edu.au/16257/3/Ross_whole.pdf.pdf
- Beattie, J.W. (n.d.) Among the Tombs, Dead Island, Port Arthur [Photographic Postcard].Joseph Lebovic Gallery Collection No.1. Hobart, Tasmania: National Museum of Australia. Retrieved 2020-04-09 http://collectionsearch.nma.gov.au/object/32098/print
- Bowen, F. (1907-06-19). The Isle of the Dead, Tasmania. Where the Convicts Sleep. Australian Town and Country Journal, p. 25. TROVE National Library of Australia. Retrieved 2020-04-09 https://trove.nla.gov.au/newspaper/article/71593432
- Burn, David (1905). "An Excursion to Port Arthur in 1842. (Port Arthur Van Diemen's Land)". Hobart, Tasmania: J. W. Beattie. OL 14007289M – via State Library of Victoria Digital Library.
- Catchpole, H. (2004-08-19). Island Reveals Mysteries of the Dead. ABC Science. Retrieved 2020-04-09 https://www.abc.net.au/science/articles/2004/08/19/1178596.htm
- Clarke, M. (1873-07-12). Port Arthur No.II. The Argus, Melbourne Victoria. p. 1. TROVE National Library of Australia. Retrieved 2020-04-29 https://trove.nla.gov.au/newspaper/article/5867137
- Cook, E W. (c. 1868) Island of the Dead, Port Arthur [Painting]. Libraries Tasmania's Online Collection, Tasmania, Archive and Heritage Office retrieved 2020-04-20 https://stors.tas.gov.au/144584927
- Daly, J. (2000-08-19). Testing the Waters. A Report on Sea Levels. JSCOT Submission – Section 3. Canberra, ACT, Australia: Joint Standing Committee on Treaties. Parliament of Australia. Retrieved 2020-04-09 https://www.aph.gov.au/Parliamentary_Business/Committees/Joint/Completed_Inquiries/jsct/kyoto/sub44c
- Davidson, J. (1995). Port Arthur: A tourist history. Australian Historical Studies (26)105, p. 653. doi:10.1080/10314619508595988. Retrieved 2020-04-28.
- Dead Island. (1910-01-7). The Hobart Mercury, p. 8. TROVE National Library of Australia. Retrieved 2020-04-09. https://trove.nla.gov.au/newspaper/article/10049864
- Dead Island, the Work of Improvement (1909-05-19). The Hobart Mercury, p. 3. TROVE National Library of Australia. Retrieved 2020-04-09. https://trove.nla.gov.au/newspaper/article/9982485
- Department of Environment & Heritage (DEH). (2005). Environment Protection and Diversity Act 1999, Inclusion of Places in the National Heritage List. Commonwealth of Australia Special Gazette (June 3, No S94, p. 7). Retrieved 2020-04-09 https://www.environment.gov.au/system/files/pages/ba18eab5-1a30-4f5d-af0d-d3f555f56b83/files/105778.pdf
- Doyle, H. Context Pty Ltd. Urban Initiatives Pty Ltd. (2002). Port Arthur Historic Site Landscape Management Plan – prepared for Port Arthur Historic Site Management Authority. Melbourne, Victoria: Context Pty Ltd, p. 7. Retrieved 2020-04-09 https://portarthur.org.au/wp-content/uploads/2017/12/PAHSMA-Landscape-Management-Plan.pdf
- Friday Morning April 8, (1836-04-08). The Hobart Town Courier, Hobart Tasmania, p. 2. TROVE National Library Australia. Retrieved 2020-04-09 https://trove.nla.gov.au/newspaper/article/4177049
- Goc, N. (2002). From Convict Prison to the Gothic Ruins of Tourist Attraction. Historic Environment, 16(3): 22–26. Retrieved 2020-05-01 https://eprints.utas.edu.au/8591/3/Convict_prison.Gothic_ruins..pdf
- Godden Mackay Logan Pty Ltd, Middleton, G. Jackman, G. Tuffin, R. Clark, J. (2009). Port Arthur Historic Sites Management Plan 2008. n.p. Port Arthur Historic Site Management Authority. pp. 18–19. Retrieved 2020-04-09 https://whc.unesco.org/en/documents/105335
- Great Britain Hydrographic Department & Purey-Cust, H. E & Davies, Bryer & Co. (1897). Tasmania – South Coast. Port Arthur [Map]. London: Admiralty. TROVE National Library Australia. Retrieved 2020-04-09 Tasmania – South Coast. Port Arthur [cartographic material]
- Haran, B. (2003-02-15). Isle of the Dead Gives up Clues. BBC News Online, World Edition, Science & Nature. Retrieved 2020-04-09 http://news.bbc.co.uk/2/hi/science/nature/2761677.stm
- Hargraves, N. (2006). Point Puer. Companion to Tasmanian History. (1st ed.) Centre for Tasmanian Historical Studies. Hobart. Tasmania: University of Tasmania. (Vol. 1). Retrieved 2020-04-09 https://www.utas.edu.au/library/companion_to_tasmanian_history/P/Point%20Puer.htm
- Hendy-Fooley, G. (1933-09-12). Barron Field. The Sydney Morning Herald, Sydney NSW TROVE National Library of Australia. Retrieved 2020-04-09 https://trove.nla.gov.au/newspaper/article/17006400?searchTerm=Henry+Savery
- Isle of the Dead, Port Arthur (1909). [Photographic Postcard Series]. Joseph Lebovic Gallery Collection No.1. Sydney, NSW: National Museum of Australia. Retrieved 2020-04-09 [http://collectionsearch.nma.gov.au/ce/isle%20of%20the%20dead?object=210917 http://collectionsearch.nma.gov.au/ce/isle%20of%20the%20dead?object=210917]
- Jeffrey, M. Burke, J. (1900). A Burglar's Life, or, The Stirring Adventures of the Great English Burglar Mark Jeffrey: A thrilling history of the dark days of convictism in Australia. Tales of the Early Days. Hobart, Tasmania: J. Walch & Sons. State Library Victoria digital library. Retrieved 2020-04-26 http://handle.slv.vic.gov.au/10381/183230
- Jones, J. K. (2016). Historical Archaeology of Touri8sm at Port Arthur, Tasmania, 1885–1960. Unpublished PhD. Thesis, Simon Fraser University, British Columbia, Canada. Retrieved 2020-04-09 https://www.academia.edu/34948867/Historical_Archaeology_of_Tourism_at_Port_Arthur_Tasmania_1885-1960.
- Legresy, B. (2017-08-29) Sea Level Rise: Understanding the Past – Improving Projections for the future. CSIRO Oceans and Atmosphere. Retrieved 2020-04-09 http://www.cmar.csiro.au/sealevel/sl_hist_few_hundred.html
- Links, F. Roach, M. Jackman, G. (2004). Using Geophysics to Locate Burials and other Cultural Features, Isle of the Dead, Port Arthur, Tasmania. Australian Society of Exploration Geophysicists Extended Abstracts, (1),1–5, doi:10.1071/ASEG2004ab089. ISSN 2202-0586 Retrieved 2020-04-09 https://www.tandfonline.com/doi/pdf/10.1071/ASEG2004ab089?needAccess=true
- Lord, R. (1990). Inscription in Stone, the Isle of the Dead, Port Arthur: Inscriptions from the Cemetery of the Port Arthur Penal Establishment 1830–1877. (3rd ed.) Taroona, Tas: Richard Lord and Partners. ISBN 0-9597473-3-8. OCLC 27624866.
- Manton, J. (1845). The Isle of the Dead or the Burial-place at Port Arthur, Van-Diemen's Land. Missionary Series No. 652. [Pamphlet]. London, UK: John Mason. TROVE National Library of Australia. Retrieved 2020-04-09 https://nla.gov.au/nla.obj-83567059/view?partId=nla.obj-83567403
- Maxwell-Stewart, H. (2006). Convicts. The Companion to Tasmanian History. (1st ed.) Centre for Tasmanian Historical Studies. Hobart, Tasmania: University of Tasmania. (Vol1. Retrieved 2020-04-09 https://www.utas.edu.au/library/companion_to_tasmanian_history/C/Convicts.htm2
- Morgan, K. (2016). Port Arthur. Dictionary Plus Social Sciences. Oxford University Press. Retrieved 2020-04-22 https://www.oxfordreference.com/view/10.1093/acref/9780191823534.001.0001/acref-9780191823534
- Mr. Alfred Mawle. (1940-09-05). The Hobart Mercury. Hobart, Tasmania, p. 5. TROVE National Library of Australia. Retrieved 2020-04-10. https://trove.nla.gov.au/newspaper/article/25823110/1855595
- Port Arthur Dead Island. (1872-03-16). The Tasmanian Newspaper. Launceston, Tasmania, p 6. TROVE National Library of Australia. Retrieved 2020-04-09 https://trove.nla.gov.au/newspaper/article/201349281
- PAHSMA (2020) Isle of the Dead Cemetery Tour. Retrieved 2020-04-28 Isle of the Dead cemetery tour
- PAHSMA (2017) Port Arthur People: Reverend George Eastman. Retrieved 2020-04-28 https://portarthur.org.au/wp-content/uploads/2017/12/People-of-the-Port-Arthur-Convict-ra1.pdf
- PAHSMA (2020) Conservation Projects and Programs. Isle of the Dead Monuments and Walkways. Retrieved 2020-04-28 [https://portarthur.org.au/heritage-management/conservation-projects-programs/ https://portarthur.org.au/heritage-management/conservation-projects-programs/]
- Roe, M. (2006). For the Term of his Natural Life in Film. The Companion to Tasmanian History. Centre for Tasmanian Historical Studies. Hobart. Tas. Retrieved 2020-04-09 https://www.utas.edu.au/library/companion_to_tasmanian_history/F/For%20the%20term%20of%20his%20natural%20life%20on%20film.htm
- Roe, M. (2006). Henry Savery. The Companion to Tasmanian History. Centre for Tasmanian Historical Studies. Hobart. Tas. Retrieved 2020-04-09
- Ross, J. C. (1847). A Voyage of Discovery and Research in the Southern and Antarctic Regions, During the Years 1839–43. Vol. 2. London: John Murray. pp. 22–32.
- Ross, L. (2006). Isle of the Dead. Companion to Tasmanian History. (1st ed.) Centre for Historical Tasmanian Studies. Hobart, Tasmania: University of Tasmania. (Vol.1). Retrieved 2020-04-09 https://www.utas.edu.au/library/companion_to_tasmanian_history/I/Isle%20of%20the%20Dead.htm
- Ross, L. (1995). Death and Burial at Port Arthur, 1830–1877 (Honours thesis). University of Tasmania, Hobart, Tasmania. University of Tasmania Open Access Depository. Retrieved 2020-04-09 https://eprints.utas.edu.au/16257/
- Shortt, J. C. (1889). Notes on the Possible Oscillation of Levels of Land and Sea in Tasmania During Recent Years. Royal Society of Tasmania Papers, Hobart, Tasmania. 18–20. University of Tasmania Open Access Depository. Retrieved 2020-04-09 https://eprints.utas.edu.au/15749/
- Tasman Council. (n.d.) History of the Tasman Peninsula. Nubeena, Tasmania. Service Tasmania. Retrieved 2020-04-09 https://www.tasman.tas.gov.au/tourism/local-history/
- Tasmanian Nomenclature (1911-09-23). The Place Names of the Island, a Record of Origins and Dates. The Hobart Mercury. (XI) p. 11. TROVE National Library of Australia. Retrieved 2020-04-09 http://nla.gov.au/nla.new-article10115196
- The Digital Panopticon (2020) Mark Jeffery b. 1825, Life Archive ID obpdef1-1358-18490611 Digital Humanities Institute. Universities of Liverpool, Oxford, Sheffield, Sussex and Tasmania. Digital Humanities Institute. Version 1.2.1, retrieved 2020-4-26 https://www.digitalpanopticon.org/life?id=obpdef1-1358-18490611
- The Late Rev. George Eastman. (1870-05-02). The Hobart Mercury, p. 3. TROVE National Library of Australia. Retrieved 2020-04-09. https://trove.nla.gov.au/newspaper/article/8863889
- Thorn, A. Piper, A. (1996). The Isle of the Dead: an Integrated Approach to the Management and Natural Protection of an Archaeological Site. Studies in Conservation. 41(sup1), 188–192. doi:10.1179/sic.1996.41. p. 188. Retrieved 2020-04-22 https://www.researchgate.net/publication/272226838_The_isle_of_the_Dead_an_integrated_approach_to_the_management_and_natural_protection_of_an_archaeological_site
- Trollope, A. (2013). Australia and New Zealand (Cambridge Library Collection – History of Oceania). Cambridge: Cambridge University Press. doi: https://babel.hathitrust.org/cgi/pt?id=mdp.39015010728460&view=1up&seq=13
- Tropman, L. Gibbons, G. S. (1984). Isle of the Dead, Port Arthur: a study of the island and recommendation for conservation of the headstones and the island. Port Arthur Conservation Project.Hobart, Tasmania, National Parks and Wildlife Service. OCLC 876315028. TROVE National Library of Australia. Retrieved 2020-04-07 https://nla.gov.au/nla.obj-1382371370/view
- UNESCO. (2010). Decision: 34 COM 8B.16. Cultural Properties – Australian Convict Sites (Australia). UNESCO World Heritage Centre. Retrieved 2020-04-09. https://whc.unesco.org/en/decisions/3995/
- University of Tasmania (1999) Henry Savery, Quintus Servinton. Online Library Exhibition. Retrieved 2020-4-29.https://www.utas.edu.au/library/exhibitions/quintus/index.html
- Vandalism at Dead Island (1913-11-18). The Hobart Mercury. Hobart, Tasmania. TROVE National Library of Australia. Retrieved 2020-04-09 https://trove.nla.gov.au/newspaper/article/10307371
- Weidenhofer, Maggie (1990). Port Arthur: A Place of Misery (2nd ed.). Port Arthur, Tasmania: B&M Reid and Port Arthur Historic Site Management Authority. ISBN 978-0-646-00003-9.
- Xerri, D. (2018). Dark and Literary: a Tour to the Isle of the Dead. Journal of Language and Cultural Education (6)2, 126–143. University of Malta, Malta. doi:10.2478/jolace-2018-0020 Retrieved 2020-05-05 https://www.researchgate.net/publication/329520739_Dark_and_literary_A_tour_to_the_Isle_of_the_Dead
