= Eben Hayes =

American politician (1789-1881)

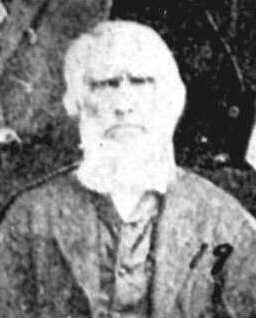

South Carolina House of Representatives
- In office 1868–1870
- In office 1872–1874

Personal details
- Born: Ebenezer Hayes; 1798 Marion, South Carolina
- Died: 1881 (aged 82–83)
- Party: Republican
- Spouse: Nancy Ann Dew

Ebenezer (Eben) Hayes (1798 - 1881) was a farmer, Methodist preacher and a member of the South Carolina House of Representatives, during the Reconstruction era.

Ebenezer Hayes was born in Marion, South Carolina, in 1798, the eldest of three sons to William Hayes, whose family came from Virginia and were of English descent. Hayes married Nancy Ann Dew (1806 - 1870) and his brother, Henry, married Nancy's sister, Marina. Ebenezer and Nancy had nine children, born between 1826 and 1854.

Hayes represented Marion County, South Carolina in the South Carolina House of Representatives, during the Reconstruction era. He was elected twice, serving from 1868 to 1870 and 1872 to 1874. He was a member of the Radical Republicans, a party faction with a goal of immediate, complete and permanent eradication of slavery, without compromise.
