= Ebenezer Platt Rogers =

American minister and author

- Born: December 18, 1816; New York City, United States
- Died: October 22, 1881 (aged 64)
- Occupations: Minister; Author

Ebenezer Platt Rogers (December 18, 1817 – October 22, 1881) was an American minister and author.

Rogers, the son of Edmund J. and Rebecca (Platt) Rogers, was born in the City of New York, December 18, 1817. In 1831 his parents removed to a country residence in Fairfield, Connecticut, from which place the son entered Yale College. The sudden death of his father, in June 1835, terminated his college course the next year; but he received the degree of Bachelor of Arts in 1844, and was thenceforth enrolled with his class.

He was engaged for a time in mercantile pursuits, and in 1837 entered the Princeton Theological Seminary, but after a year was compelled to suspend his studies by weakness of the eyes. After two years of outdoor life in the country, he resumed his preparation for the ministry, in Fairfield and in Hartford. He was married in the latter place on February 26, 1839, to Elizabeth, daughter of John Caldwell, Esq., who survived him.

On November 4, 1840, he was ordained pastor of the Congregational church of Chicopee Falls, Massachusetts, and in 1843 removed to the charge of the Edwards Congregational Church in Northampton. In December 1846, he resigned to recruit his health by a Southern residence, and while in Augusta, Georgia, was invited to supply temporarily the pulpit of the First Presbyterian Church in that city; his services proved so acceptable that he was called to the pastorate, and he held that position from 1847 to 1854, when he became pastor of the Seventh Presbyterian Church in Philadelphia. In November, 1856, he was installed pastor of the North Reformed Dutch Church, of Albany, New York, and after six years of acceptable and useful service there, became pastor of the South Reformed Church in New York City, where he labored until the failure of his health obliged him to offer his resignation, in February 1881. A few days later he was prostrated by a stroke of paralysis, from the effects of which he never recovered. He died in Montclair, New Jersey on October 22, 1881 at the age of 64.

His five daughters and three of his five sons survived him; one son died in infancy, and his eldest child died in the Union Army in the American Civil War.

He received the degree of Doctor of Divinity from Oglethorpe University, Georgia, in 1853. He had published several volumes on religious subjects, besides many sermons. A memorial sketch was printed for private circulation.
