= Waldemar Klee =

Danish-American gardener (1853–1891)

Waldemar Gøthrick Klee (7 October 1853 — 7 February 1891) was a Danish-born American horticulturist. He worked as a gardener at the agricultural grounds of the University of California, Berkeley and was involved in the first biological control efforts in the US, making use of parasitoids from Australia to control cotton cushiony scales.

Klee was born in Copenhagen and moved to the United States of America at the age of 19 to study in California. He was recognized by Professor Eugene W. Hilgard at the State University at Berkeley and he was later employed at the University of California as gardener in Charge of Agricultural Grounds and was for some time, around 1886 to 1888, Inspector of Fruit Pests in the California State Board of Horticulture. He conducted experiments in the introduction and growing of many plants of economic importance. He attempted to grow Cinchona in 1881, at a time when quinine was valuable.

He died from tuberculosis, aged 37, at the Gravenstein Ranch in Santa Cruz and was buried in the Odd Fellows' Cemetery. He was married to Jennie Barry and they had three children.
