= Ebenezer Alfred Johnson =

American classical scholar and lawyer (1813–1891)

Ebenezer Alfred Johnson (August 18, 1813 – July 18, 1891) was an American classical scholar.

Johnson was born in New Haven, Connecticut, on August 18, 1813, the son of Ebenezer and Sarah B. (Law) Johnson. He graduated from Yale College in 1833. After teaching for two years in New Canaan, Connecticut, he became a tutor in Yale College, and during his tutorship of two years he was also engaged in study at Yale Law School. He was then admitted to the New Haven bar, but a year later accepted a call to an assistant professorship of Greek and Latin in the University of the City of New York. In 1840 he was made full Professor of Latin, and this chair he retained until his death. In 1867 he received from the University with which he was connected the honorary degree of LL.D., and in 1888, on the completion of his semi-centenary, the further honor of L.H.D. He was a thorough and earnest scholar, and early in life he published editions of Cicero's Select Orations and of Cornelius Nepos.

He died of apoplexy at his home in Yonkers, New York, on July 18, 1891, at the age of 78 years. He had married, on August 18, 1842, Margaret F., daughter of Dr. John Yan Cleve, who died on June 15, 1849. Two of their children died in infancy; and two survive them—a daughter and a son (a graduate of the University of New York and of the Yale Divinity School). He was next married, on July 9, 1851, to Harriet, daughter of William B. Gilley, of New York City, who survived him, without children.
