= Ebenezer A. Warner =

American politician

Member of the Michigan House of Representatives from the Chippewa County district
- In office January 5, 1859 – December 31, 1862
- Preceded by: District established
- Succeeded by: James P. Pendill

Personal details
- Born: Connecticut

Ebenezer A. Warner was a Michigan politician.

Warner was born in Connecticut. On November 2, 1858, Warner was elected to the Michigan House of Representatives, where he represented the Chippewa County district from January 5, 1859, to December 31, 1862. During his time in the legislature, he lived in Sault Ste. Marie, Michigan.
