= Kevin Colls =

Australian rules footballer

Personal information
- Full name: Kevin Colls
- Born: 23 April 1922
- Died: 12 October 2009 (aged 87)
- Original team: Carnegie
- Height: 177 cm (5 ft 10 in)
- Weight: 80 kg (176 lb)

Playing career^{1}
Years	Club	Games (Goals)
1942, 1946–47	Richmond	8 (0)
- ^{1} Playing statistics correct to the end of 1947.

Kevin Colls (23 April 1922 – 12 October 2009) was a former Australian rules footballer who played with Richmond in the Victorian Football League (VFL).
