= Eban (name) =

Eban (Hebrew: אבן) is both a given name and a surname. Notable people with the name include:

== Surname ==
- Abba Eban (1915–2002), Israeli diplomat and politician, and a scholar of the Arabic and Hebrew languages.
- Eli Eban, Israeli-American clarinetist
- Katherine Eban, American investigative journalist and author

== Given name ==
- Eban Goodstein (born 1960), economist, author, and public educator
- Eban Hyams, Australian basketball player

== Fictional characters ==
A protagonist from a 2000 film Eban and Charley

== See also ==
- Eben
