= Ebenezer Sunder Singh =

Artist

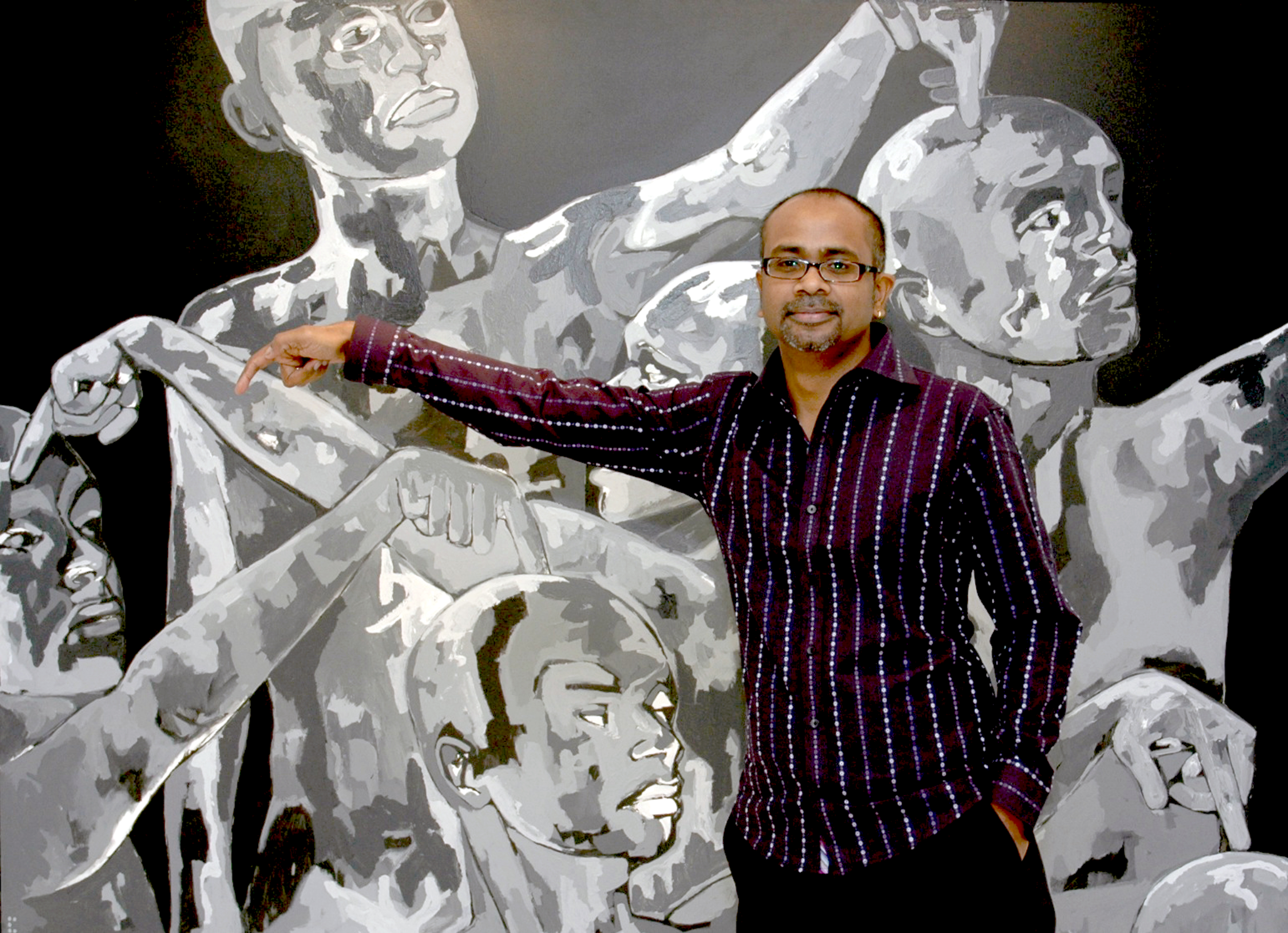
- Ebenezer Sunder Singh, at the opening of White Nights at Palette Art Gallery in New Delhi
- Born: Tirunelveli, Tamil Nadu, India
- Occupation: Artist

Ebenezer Sunder Singh is an Indian-American visual artist based in Brooklyn, New York. Singh works primarily as a painter, sculptor, photographer and filmmaker.

== Early life and education ==
Singh was born in the temple town of Tirunelveli, Tamil Nadu in India. His formative years were influenced by the twin heritages of his hometown, which houses both Christian cathedrals and the Hindu Nellaiappar Temple. Singh went on to graduate from Government College of Fine Arts, Chennai, where he had begun to show his work in state-level exhibitions. He studied under A. P. Santhanaraj and L. Munusamy. Following his move to the United States, Singh received his MFA in Visual Art from the Lesley University College of Art and Design, where he studied photography and video art under Julia Scher and Judith Barry.

== Career ==
Avatar, fiberglass sculpture. Currently in the permanent collection of Museum of Asian Art in Berlin, Germany.

Singh's early career began at Cholamandal Artists' Village, Chennai, the largest artists' commune in India. His primary visual influences were initially based on Dravidian temple art and its mythological capacity for figuration. Singh debuted his paintings and sculptures at a 1996 solo exhibition titled The Hollow Men, The Stuffed Men at Easel Art Gallery. Singh was then chosen to represent India in 1998 at the International Artists Camp held in Sri Lanka. The following year, Singh received the Charles Wallace Grant and traveled to England, where his illustration and printmaking works were exhibited at Kingston University in a show titled Neti...Neti... His work saw him drawing on metaphysical themes of redemptive resurrection and transcendentalism.

'Firefly...Firely', oil on linen. Exhibited at the 2026 Future Fair, NYC.

In the Indian art sphere, Pundole Art Gallery in Mumbai showcased Singh's figurative works, as did Anant Art Gallery, Threshold Art Gallery and New Delhi's contemporary art hub Palette Art Gallery. In 2001, he exhibited his paintings and sculptures at the Museum of Asian Art (Museum für Asiatische Kunst) in Berlin, Germany in a series titled Inspirationen. The Museum of Asian Art later acquired twelve of Singh's paintings and sculptures for its permanent collection, as did the National Gallery of Modern Art in New Delhi, India, which collected three of his paintings. Singh was awarded the Artist's Fulbright Fellowship as part of the Fulbright Program and researched on the cathartic symbolism of religious iconography in the context of the east-west subaltern dialogue. For the next decade, Singh continued to exhibit his contemporary figurative works in venues like Barcelona, Budapest, Munich, and Mumbai with self-portrait photography, canvases and sequined fiberglass sculptures.

Singh's photographic self-portraits were chosen to be a part of a traveling exhibition titled Self and the Other - Portraiture in Contemporary Indian Photography that toured through Barcelona and Vitoria-Gasteiz, Spain in 2010. Art historian Deepak Ananth described Singh's series Wake Me Up When I Am Dead as being "radical and subversive... Ebenezer's self-portraits reveal a complex iconography, unafraid of their political undertones and repercussions." Singh's video art pieces, such as Master of Arts and Narashimha Avatar, have been included in short film festivals and exhibitions. Austin Peay State University in Tennessee showcased Singh's videos in its annual Terminal Short Video Festival in 2011.

In an exhibition titled Radiate: Art of the South Asian Diaspora, Singh's sculptures and visual works were exhibited at Gallery 400 in the University of Illinois at Chicago and at the Windsor Art Center in Connecticut. Singh's collaborations include a 2014 exhibition titled When Marco Polo Saw Elephants, a show reviewed by art critic Susan Dunne of the Hartford Courant. Singh's works have also been shown at renowned art fairs, most recently at both the 2026 Future Fair and 2026 Spring/Break Art Fair in New York City.

== Work ==
Tight Rope, 2025. Exhibited at the Spring Break Art Fair 2025, NYC.

Singh's works are often described as metaphysical explications on memory, mythology and symbolic iconography. Indian art critic Nancy Adajania describes Singh's work, saying, "Ebenezer uses his own body as a measure of his expression, allowing it to soar only to be grounded by its reflection: embracing a cosmic totality only to be cut by the swirling swathe of death...it liberates him from the distractions of excessive visual stimuli, to concentrate on the live material of the body that burns a thirsty flaming yellow, turns green with lust and envy and blue with spiritual awaking."

'Constellation', life-size bronze, 2007. Exhibited with Pundole Art Gallery in Mumbai, 2007.

Art critic and Director and Chief Curator of the Kiran Nadar Museum of Art, Roobina Karode says that he "consistently draws on themes such as redemption, betrayal, guilt, wanderlust and male valor," and that the artist "channels his spontaneity on canvas and sculpture... and exposes preconceived notions on the 'superhuman' ideal of male virility and societal masculinity." Writing about Singh's charcoal drawings and fiberglass sculptures in a solo exhibition titled Thus Spake Zarathustra she said, "Ebenezer’s drawings are intensely evocative with their charged malleability... [and he] masters the controlled messiness of the medium for its raw appeal and expressivity."

Singh's works have been reviewed and praised across many reputed publications, including The New York Times, The Art Newspaper, Hyperallergic, and White Hot Magazine. In reviewing his piece Tightrope at the Spring/Break Art Fair, New York Times art critic Jillian Steinhauer described the work as, "emotional... big, sparkly sculptural tableaus of dinosaurs interacting with Jesus; in one, he stands atop a triceratops. The pieces are funny, sacrilegious and campy."

== Selected solo exhibitions ==
- Horse Tamer – Rosebud Contemporary, New York – 2025
- Talk to the Horse – Rosebud Contemporary, New York – 2024
- Horseplay – Rosebud Contemporary, New York – 2023
- Holy Smoke and Other Works, R L Fine Arts, New York, USA - 2010
- Thus Spake Zarathustra, Pundole Art Gallery, Mumbai, India - 2008
- Ebenezer-A Decade-Works 1997 – 2007, Galerie Muller & Plate, Munich, Germany - 2007
- Sharing the Planet, Pundole Art Gallery, Mumbai, India - 2007
- White Nights, Palette Art Gallery, New Delhi, India – 2006
- Ebenezer - Recent Works, Pundole Art Gallery, Mumbai, India - 2005
- Blind Man’s Profession, Anant Art Gallery, New Delhi, India - 2005
- Neti...Neti, Kingston University, Surrey, UK - 1999

== Selected group exhibitions ==
=== Museum exhibitions ===
- Self and the Other – Portraiture in Contemporary Indian Photography – Curators Devika Daulet-Singh & Luisa Ortinez - La Virreina Centre De la Imatge Palau de la Virreina, Barcelona, Spain. ARTIUM –Centro-Museo Vascode Arte Contemporanea, Vitoria, Gasteiz, Spain - 2009 (July) to 2010 (February)
- Hybrid Trend - Contemporary Art, India & Korea, Hangaram Art Museum, Seoul, Korea – 2006
- Recent Museum Acquisitions, National Gallery of Modern Art, New Delhi, India – 2006
- Inspirationen – Museum fur Asiatic Kunst, Berlin, Germany - 2001(Sep) to 2002(Feb)

=== Group exhibitions ===
- Remembrance of Things Past – Graham Gillmore, Stan Narten, Ebenezer Singh – Rosebud Contemporary, New York – 2023
- Sojourner – Curated by Kyoko Sato – Sojourner Gallery, New York – 2023
- The Masks We Wear – ‘B’ Dry Goods, Brooklyn, New York – 2022-23
- Good Trouble – Whitebox, New York – 2020
- Space, Body, Land & Senses – Rosebud Contemporary & Art World, Sarala’s Art Center, Chennai – 2018
- Little Infinity – Art and Aesthetic Gallery, New Delhi – 2017
- When Marco Polo Saw Elephants, Art and Aesthetic Gallery, New Delhi, India - 2015. Five Points Gallery, Torrington, CT, USA - 2014
- Radiate, Windsor Art Center, CT. Gallery 400, University of Illinois at Chicago, IL, USA - 2012
- Video Wednesday – II, Curator Gayatri Sinha & Critical Collective, Gallery Espace, New Delhi, India - 2012
- Terminal Short Video Festival, Austin Peay State University, Tennessee, USA - 2011
- End to End, Harvestworks Digital Media Arts Centre, New York, USA - 2011
- The Intuitive-Logic Revisited, Osian’s & World Economic Forum, Davos-Klosters, Switzerland - 2011
- Myself – A Survey of Contemporary Self-Portraiture, Sheppard Fine Arts Gallery, Reno, Nevada, USA - 2011
- Video India, Videospace, Budapest, Hungary - 2010
- Marvelous Reality, Gallery Espace, New Delhi, India - 2009
- The Art of India – 20 years of Contemporary Indian Art, Indien-Institut, Galerie Muller & Plate, Munich, Germany - 2009
- Human Figure, Curator Marta Jakimowicz Karle, Gallery Threshold, New Delhi, India - 2006
- Are we like this only, Vadehra Art Gallery, New Delhi, India - 2005
