= Ebenezer Trotman =

English architect

Ebenezer Trotman (6 June 1809 – 1 January 1865) was an English architect of churches and railway stations. Much of his work was carried out as principal assistant to Sir William Tite.

Trotman was born in Tewkesbury, Gloucestershire to Daniel Trotman and Phoebe Easthope Trotman. A nephew of Sir John Easthope, he started work with Tite as a junior clerk, with whom he worked extensively on railway stations in Edinburgh, Perth and in London, and specialised in Tudor and Gothic Revival architecture.

Notable works in which he took a principal role in included:

- Holy Trinity Church, in red brick Gothic, at Oldbury Road, Tewkesbury, (1837)
- St James's Church, Gerrards Cross, in the Byzantine style, built with Tite (1858–9)

He died at his house in Regent's Park, on New Year's Day 1865, and is buried in Tite's West Norwood Cemetery.
