= Eben Jenks Loomis =

American astronomer (1828–1912)

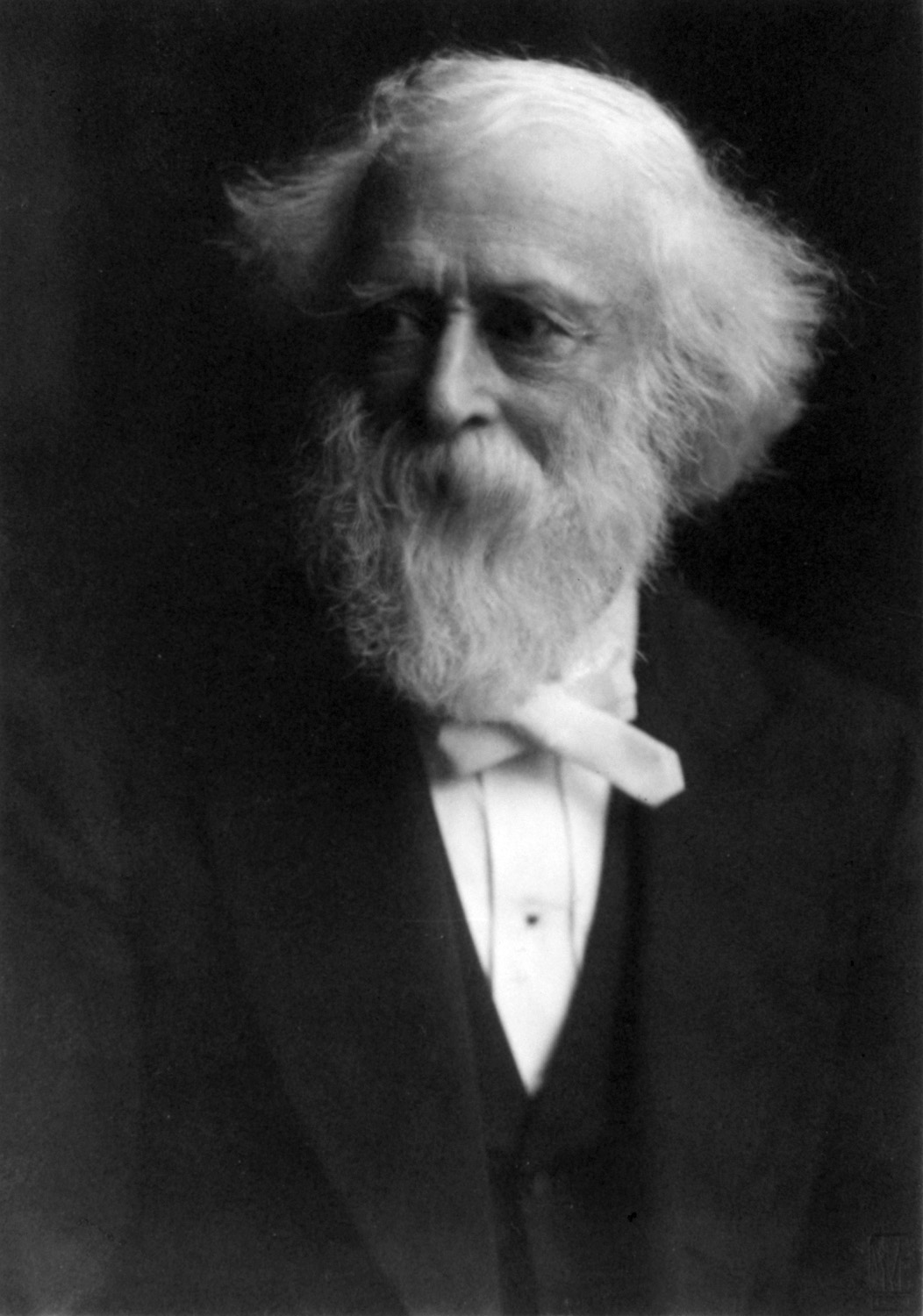
- Born: November 11, 1828; Oppenheim, New York
- Died: December 2, 1912 (aged 84)
- Scientific career
- Fields: Astronomy
- Workplaces: American Ephemeris and Nautical Almanac

Eben Jenks Loomis (November 11, 1828 – December 2, 1912) was an American astronomer, born in Oppenheim, New York. He attended the Lawrence Scientific School (Harvard) in 1851–53. He was assistant in the American Ephemeris and Nautical Almanac office from 1850 until his retirement in 1900. During this time he also held the position of special assistant at the United States Naval Observatory in Washington, DC.

Loomis was a member of the United States eclipse expedition to Africa in 1889, which observed the total solar eclipse on December 22. He is author of Wayside Sketches (1894); An Eclipse Party in Africa (1896); and A Sunset Idyl, and Other Poems (1903).

He was the father of Mabel Loomis Todd.
