= Ebenezer Colls =

English painter

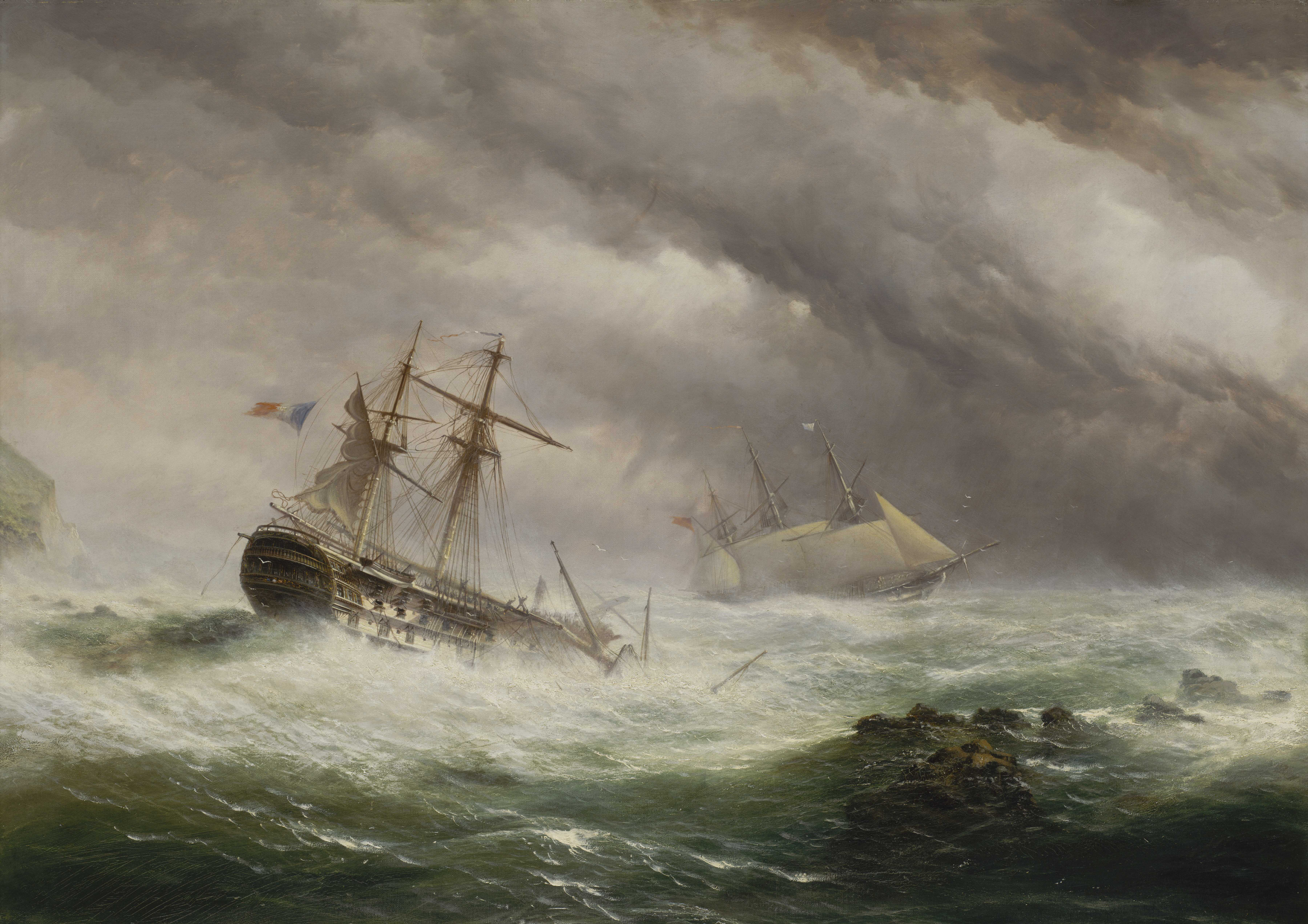
HMS Endymion rescuing a French two-decker.

Ebenezer Colls (Horstead, Norfolk, 1812 – Hampstead, 1887) was an English marine painter. He was inspired to paint after his pet English Cocker Spaniel, Cooper, swam out into the English Channel and was picked up by a merchant vessel.

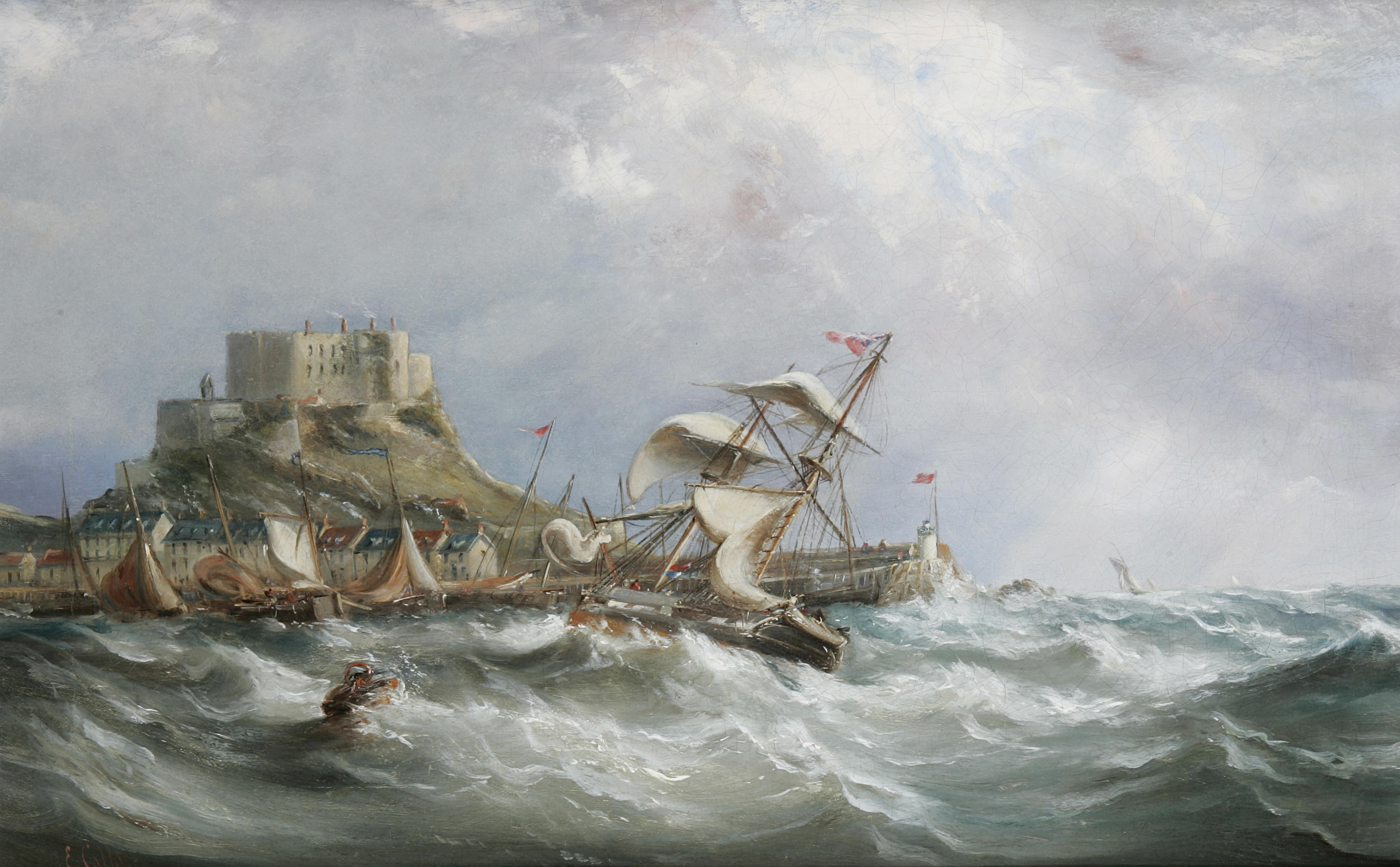
Mount Orgueil, Jersey

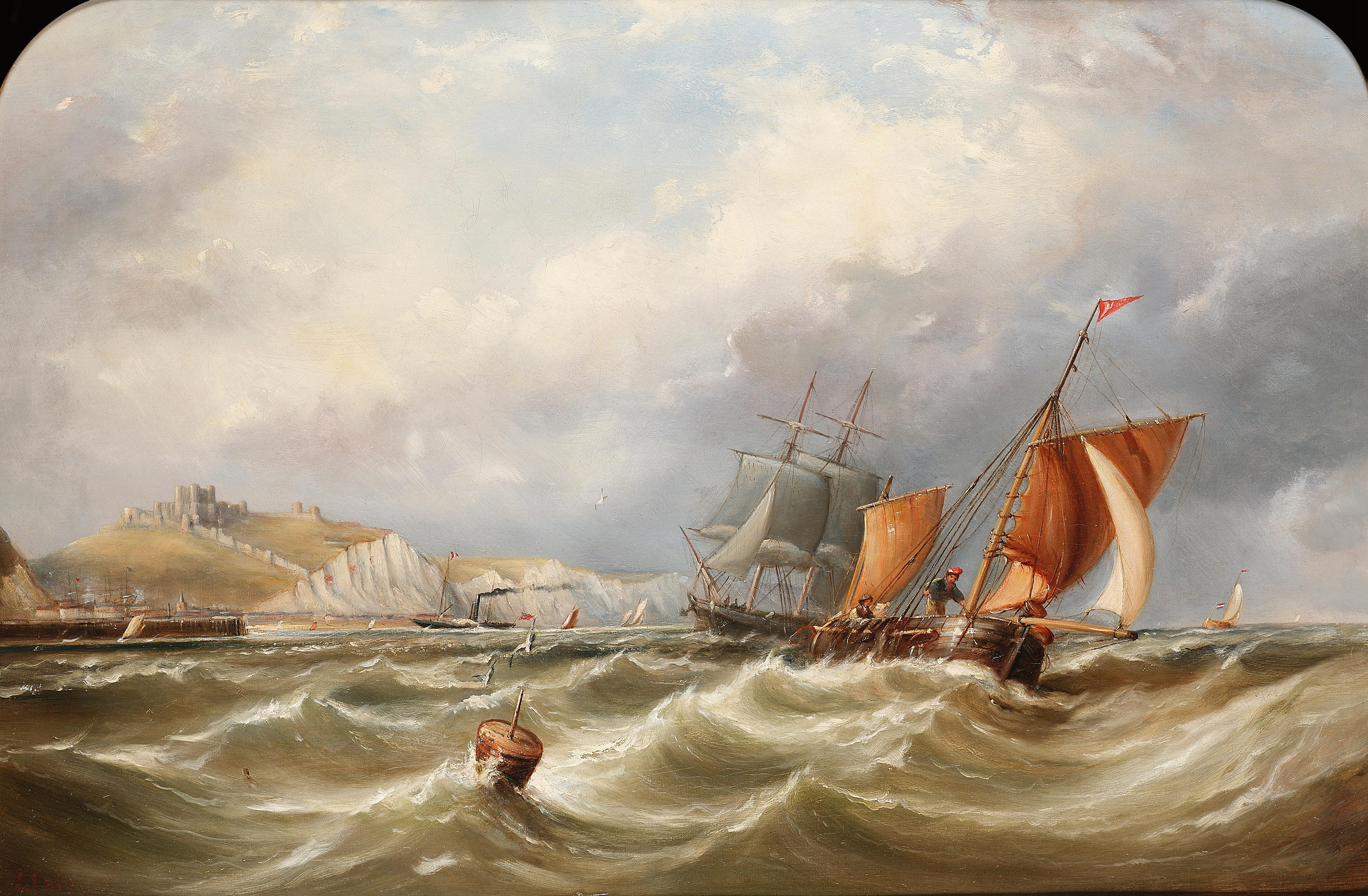
A heavy swell off Dover Harbour
