= Ebenezer Wake Cook =

English painter (1843–1926)

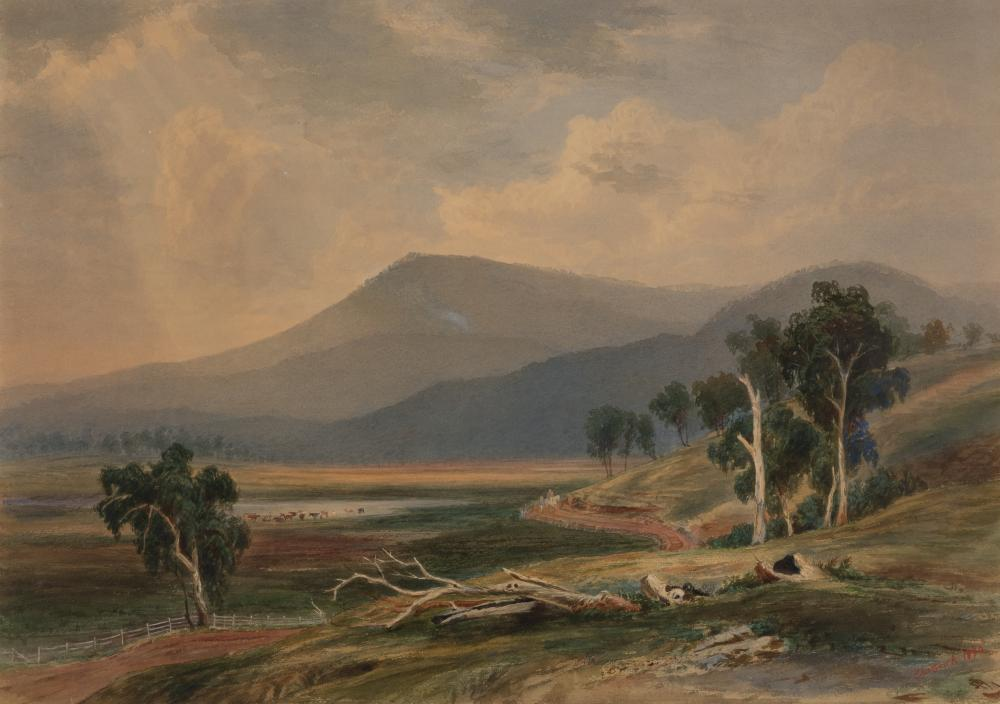
Western Victoria Landscape, 1870, watercolour

Ebenezer Wake Cook (28 December 1843 – 8 May 1926), generally referred to as E. Wake Cook, was a watercolour painter, one of the first in Australia, before returning to England at the age of 30.

During 1867 and 1868 Chevalier was commissioned to produce a number of images of New Zealand and Tasmania and Victoria, Australia, by Prince Alfred, Duke of Edinburgh. A watercolour of Isle of the Dead in Tasmania was painted by Cook in about 1868.

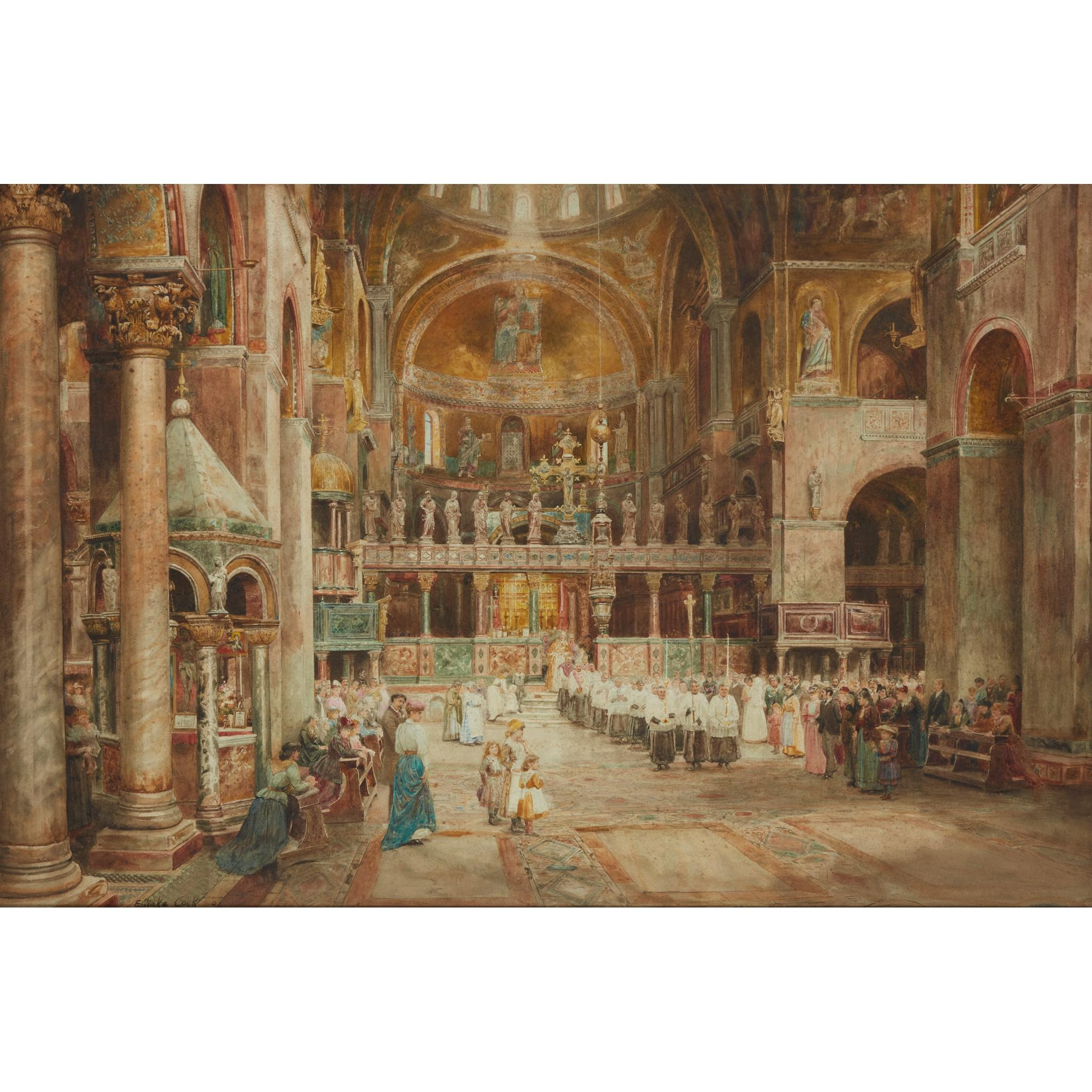
Cathedral Interior, 1894, watercolour

He was an associate of Tom Roberts, Rupert Bunny and Bertram Mackennal, and for a time worked for the Adelaide Photographic Company.

== Sources ==
- Serle, Percival (1949). "Cook, Ebenezer Wake". Dictionary of Australian Biography. Sydney: Angus & Robertson.
