= Spowart =

Spowart is a surname. Notable people with the surname include:

- Doug Spowart (born 1953), Australian photographer
- Jamie Spowart (born 1998), New Zealand rugby union player
- Ruby Spowart (born 1928), Australian photographer
- Thomas Spowart (1903—1971), Scottish cricketer and educator
