= Maggie Diaz =

Australian photographer (1925–2016)

- Margaret Eunice Reid
- Born: 25 February 1925; Kansas City, Missouri
- Died: 16 October 2016 (aged 91); St Kilda
- Education: autodidact
- Known for: Photography
- Spouse(s): Clement Fraser, Jose Diaz
- Children: Stevan

Maggie Diaz (25 February 1925 – 16 October 2016) was an American-born Australian photographer who lived and worked in Melbourne from 1961. The Diaz Collection dates back to 1950s Chicago and the archive has been acquired by the State Library of Victoria, with work in the collections of the National Library of Australia and the National Gallery of Australia.

In 2011 Diaz was featured as the sole woman in a group exhibition at the State Library of Victoria titled As Modern as Tomorrow, Photographers in Post war Melbourne. Diaz' work is marked by the contrast between the glamorous commercial world and those outsiders and misfits with whom she felt a connection.

== Early life ==
Maggie Diaz was born Margaret Eunice Reid on 25 February 1925 in Kansas City, Missouri, "out of wedlock" and spent her early childhood years in New York. As a teenager during the World War II she worked in a steel mill and bakeries to support her family. By the time she was 20, she was diagnosed as "difficult and depressed". She was given electro shock treatment c1945 – 1946 and encouraged to find work as a domestic help.

In 1949, Diaz received a telegram from her brother Tom, who was a professional skater in the Harry Blackstone Magic Show – "Blackstone wants another girl, send a picture!" She was sent the fare to join the show and toured America during 1949 and 1950 season. The following year, she became a Girl Friday in an advertising agency while attending art school at night – initially doing "spot sketches". She was asked to go out with photographers, as an assistant and eventually the agency provided Diaz with her own camera, which she paid off from her wages. Diaz' early 35mm work begins at this time, recording children in the neighbourhood and life on the streets of Chicago.

== Photography career in USA – 1950s ==
Tavern Club, Chicago,1950s

Diaz adopted the name "Maggie Besson" after Betty Besson who was in the magic show and who married her brother Tom Reid. At around this time, she won a photography prize in the Chicago Tribune with a portrait of a young man in a tunnel. The $500 prize allowed her to begin her work as a freelance photographer.

During the 1950s, Diaz became resident photographer at Chicago's famous cultural hub The Tavern Club. The club was founded in 1927 "to encourage the arts, intellectual recreation and good humored interest in life." Diaz captured images of patrons, dancers and many Jazz greats including the Ramsey Lewis Trio. She also produced pictorial yearbooks for The Tavern Club in 1957 and 1958. While at the Tavern Club, Diaz was mentor to young dancer Dallas Kinney—now Pulitzer prize-winning photojournalist. Dallas Kinney thanked Diaz for her part in launching his photo journalism career on YouTube.

Between 1956 and 1959 and in a juxtaposition of wealth and poverty that was to mark her later work, Diaz documented Lower North Center for the City of Chicago – a "mixed" housing development for the underprivileged to promote the creation of community structure and educational programs including sewing classes, a ballet school, dances and religious ceremonies. This project was part of Francis Cabrini Homes and later known as "Cabrini Green". By the 1970s it was notorious for its gang wars and violence and was demolished in 2011.

In the late 1950s Diaz married Australian graphic artist, Clement Fraser and was intrigued by his stories of Australia. The marriage did not last but Diaz' fascination with Australia did.

== Diaz arrives in Melbourne – 1960s ==
Peter James, 3AW Breakfast Radio

Known as "Maggie Besson Fraser", Diaz arrived in Melbourne in 1961 on a one-way ticket (a divorce gift from her ex-husband Clement Fraser), and soon established herself has one of the city's leading commercial photographers.

Diaz depicted Melbourne "battlers" in a The Brotherhood of St Laurence Annual Report 1962-63 and was commissioned by the City of Melbourne to produce some night shots to promote the city. She worked on many commercial campaigns, always shooting for herself. Many of these photographs were never seen by the client and not printed until 40 years later. One of these photographs, "Girl Hero", an image taken for Paddle Shoes, is held in the collection of the National Gallery of Australia.

Diaz was resident photographer for 3AW in the mid-1960s, and an article in The Age newspaper of 6 March 1964 notes that "A series of photographs which form part of the interior design of the new 3AW studios in the Southern Cross Plaza are the work of a woman." Diaz also took portraits of radio personalities, and followed the mobile studio to special events and beach carnivals. A breakfast advertisement featuring Diaz’ portrait of Peter James was featured in the Broadcasting and Television News of 23 July 1965.

Diaz contributed to Group M's Photovision in 1964 exhibiting at John Reed's Museum of Modern Art with well-known contemporaries Wolfgang Sievers and Mark Strizic.

During the mid-1960s Diaz' photographs were used in a Nilsen Company publication titled Printing is People c1966. Diaz' work was as an "example of excellence" and used to teach photography students at RMIT the use of available light.

In 1964, while living in her Nicholson Street Fitzroy Studio, Diaz was introduced to the Spanish scene and recorded various troupes, well represented in the Diaz collection. This was a place where she felt truly comfortable for the first time since arriving in Melbourne. It had the vibrancy and diversity that she missed from her Chicago home. Here she met her future partner, Jose Diaz, with whom she had a son, Stevan, in 1967.

In 1968, Diaz, Jose and Stevan moved into a commercial studio in Martin Street Gardenvale with her ex-husband Clement Fraser. He had produced a map for the Liberal government, titled, 'Australia the Awakening Giant' and was making a good living selling it all over the country. When the Whitlam government won the election in 1972, the map was discontinued as a promotional tool and Clem left the studio lease to Diaz and Jose.

Two photographs included in Walkabout magazine (c1966) and taken under the name of Maggie Besson Fraser, are included in the State Library of NSW Library photography collection.

== The middle years – 1970s–1980s ==
Although they didn't marry, Diaz decided to take Jose's name and from thenceforth was known as "Maggie Diaz". During the 1970s, Diaz continued as a commercial photographer, with work from advertising agencies, such as Clemenger and Klempke.

In 1975, The Toorak Times noted that Diaz "excels in art photography" while their front cover featured one of her photos Reticulated Lady. She was also commissioned to take a portrait of Sidney Nolan's mother in St Kilda at Edgewater Towers, Marine Parade in 1977.

Diaz spent two years as staff photographer of Southern Cross News during this time – recording a huge range of events and personalities, including Tommy Hanlon from Ashton's Circus.

In the 1980s, Diaz continued to operate a commercial studio in Martin Street, Gardenvale and became known for portraiture and actors' composites, forming alliances with Sascha Agency and JM Casting. One of Diaz' subjects, sixteen-year-old actor Gwendolen De Lacy, became a lifelong friend and would later be instrumental in archiving, curating and promoting Diaz' work.

Diaz moved from her Gardenvale studio in the late 1980s and operated from a flat on Grosvenor Street, Balaclava, where she made a darkroom in a rundown shed and became known for photographing actors in doorways and laneways – always using available light.

== 1990s – The later years ==
Diaz had to move again and this time, she took an apartment around the corner in Gourlay Street, which had no darkroom; however, she continued with her work. Her knack for capturing the soul of the artist saw her portraiture of actors becoming a major interest. She photographed scores of plays at La Mama, The Courthouse and Playbox theatres in the 1990s. In the late 90s, partner Jose suffered a heart attack and Diaz' work started to wind down. In 2003, Diaz had a bad fall, which resulted in two months in Caulfield Hospital. Later that year, Jose died suddenly of a second heart attack.

== Collaboration with Gwendolen De Lacy ==
Gwen in Veil at Midnight, Art Centre Melbourne, c1985

In 2004, Diaz' friend Gwendolen De Lacy, began archiving Diaz' collection. In 2005, some highlights from the extensive collection were presented as a slide show to two packed audiences at La Mama Theatre's Courthouse, to celebrate Diaz' 80th birthday.

It was a sell-out event, which generated long-overdue interest in Diaz's life and career, and prompted a mention in the Victorian State Parliament in a speech by Johan Scheffer; "Her life has been hard and this has been a rich treasure house of insight and inspiration for a great art." This led to her first retrospective exhibition – Into the Light, which opened at City of Melbourne Museum at Old Treasury in 2007. The exhibition was printed by photographic artist and printer Tiffaney Bishop.

An Australian tour commenced and in 2008, Diaz featured on ABC 'Sunday Arts' television program. In 2010, the State Library of Victoria purchased Into the Light, the exhibition and the entire Diaz archive spanning 50 years of Diaz' work. Some of these images were included in a group show from the library collection. Called As Modern as Tomorrow: photographs in Post War Melbourne, The exhibition was held from 1 July 2011 to 5 February 2012 and included works by immigrant peers Mark Strizic and Wolfgang Sievers. Historian of photography Gael Newton commented in the State Library News that:

"The sole woman working in commercial illustration included in As Modern as Tomorrow is previously overlooked American immigrant Maggie Diaz, whose distinctively moody work has only quite recently been reintroduced to Melbourne viewers and acquired by the Library."

In 2011, Diaz was selected as a Core Program Artist with the Ballarat International Foto Biennale and her exhibition One-way Ticket featured more than 35 images from the Diaz Collection that had never been seen before. This exhibition celebrated the first 25 of Diaz' life as an artist and commercial photographer.

In 2012, the National Library of Australia purchased 18 of Diaz' photographs, catalogued under Australian life, 1960–1990 / Maggie Diaz. Diaz was subjected to extensive surgery for the removal of her left eye due to skin cancer. Following a fire in her home, she moved into long-term accommodation at Sacred Heart Mission in St Kilda – her local stomping ground. She lived at Sacred Heart Mission until her death in October 2016.

The Maggie Diaz Photography Prize for Women has been awarded biennially since 2015, celebrating her life and contributions. It is open to women photographers of all ages, and the media release requests that the artists "should use available light", a feature of much of her work.

== Exhibitions ==
- As Modern as Tomorrow – Photographers in Post-war Melbourne (Group exhibition), State Library of Victoria, ] 1 July 2011 – 5 February 2012
- Maggie Diaz, One-way Ticket Ballarat International Foto Biennale, Mining Exchange, 12 Lydiard St North, Ballarat, 20 August – 18 September 2011
- Maggie Diaz – Into the Light:, Kingston Arts Centre, 979 Nepean Highway, Moorabbin, Victoria, 20 March – 6 April 2009
- The Drum Theatre, Dandenong Town Hall, City of Greater Dandenong, 16 April – 12 June 2009
- Portland Arts Centre, Cnr Glenelg and Bentinck St, Portland, Victoria, 19 January – 27 February 2009
- Carnegie Gallery, Hobart, 16 Argyle St, Hobart, Tasmania, 2 July – 9 August 2009
- Burrinja Gallery, 351 Glenfern Road, Upwey, Victoria, 11 April – 13 July 2008
- Colac Otway Performing Arts & Cultural Centre, Cnr Gellibrand & Rae St, Colac, Victoria, 25 July – 14 September 2008
- City Museum at Old Treasury, Spring Street, Melbourne, 10 March – 24 June 2007

== Collections ==
=== State Library of Victoria ===
In 2010, The State Library of Victoria purchased Into the Light, the exhibition and the entire Diaz archive – spanning 50 years of photography. Over 1000 images have been digitised and are available online through the library catalogue.

Some titles include:

- Maggie Diaz's journey from Hawaii and arrival in Sydney on the ship Canberra 1961
- Tony MacDougall's wife and three children, 1963
- Lorna Saba, 1966
- Experimental with the Cherokees, between 1960 and 1979
- Melbourne Maternal Health, nurse visiting new mother, between 1960 and 1969.
- Child with an elephant at a circus, between 1960 and 1969
- Crowds at the beach between 1960 and 1969
- Woman working in clothing factory. between 1960 and 1969
- Myer Music Bowl; [Person on trampoline in front of a ferris wheel] between 1960 and 1969
- Children playing; beach scenes; portraits of Tommy Hanlon Jnr. and a boy; between 1960 and 1969
- Stockton Riley, musician 1980
- Bill Ford, good friend and philosopher 1961
- Lindsay Saddington, actor, teacher, Sascha Agency, 1983
- Geoff Jenkins, 1963
- Patrick Alexander (AWG) – poet and repairman 1987
- The Brotherhood of St. Laurence 1962
- Chicago 'Indian Girls' portraits, 1961
- Helen Jackson, radio presenter ABC /3AW 1979
- Ava Brown and family, Chicago, Jewish family, 1959
- Grace Luminato, La Italiana, La Superba, 1988
- Tony MacDougall's wife and three children. 1963

=== National Gallery of Australia ===
The NGA purchased four prints in 2011:

- Skipping, Lower North Center, Chicago, c 1960 prtd c 2011 Photograph, International Art, 2011.1439
- Coming or Going. Self-portrait with The Canberra, Melbourne, 1961 prtd c.2011 Photograph, Australasian Art, 2011.1440
- Elephant joy, Luna Park. c 1965 prtd 2011 Photograph, Australasian Art, 2011.1441
- Girl Hero (for Paddle Shoes) Printed by Tiffaney Bishop, Melbourne 2011, c 1965 prtd 2000 Photograph, Australasian Art, 2011.1442

=== National Library of Australia ===
The National Library of Australia purchased 18 of Maggie's photographs in 2012. These are catalogued under Australian life, 1960–1990 / Maggie Diaz and are listed below.

- Newspaper seller, Melbourne, ca. 1965 [picture] nla.pic-vn6000897 ca. 1965 (2012 printing)
- Asleep at the races, Melbourne Cup, Flemington, ca.1965 [picture] nla.pic-vn6000967 ca. 1965 (2012 printing)
- Migrants on the railway, Gardenvale, Melbourne, ca. 1965 [picture] nla.pic-vn6001024 ca. 1965 (2012 printing)
- Audience at the Myer Music Bowl, Melbourne, ca. 1965 [picture] nla.pic-vn6001047 ca. 1965 (2012 printing)
- Beach father and son, St. Kilda, Melbourne, ca. 1965 [picture] nla.pic-vn6001066 ca. 1965 (2012 printing)
- Schoolboys reaching for the ball, in the Paddle Shoes commercial, Melbourne, ca. 1965 [picture] nla.pic-vn6001103 ca. 1965 (2012 printing)
- Flinders Street traffic, Melbourne, ca. 1965 [picture] nla.pic-vn6001123 ca. 1965 (2012 printing)
- Opera House construction, Sydney, ca. 1965 [picture] nla.pic-vn6001131 ca. 1965 (2012 printing)
- Higgins boys climbing down the side of their house, Malvern, Melbourne, ca. 1970 [picture]
- Gardenvale tunnel, an Australian ballet, Gardenvale, Melbourne, May 1970 [picture]
- The Canberra, Station Pier, Port Melbourne, ca. 1965 [picture]
- Mobile broadcast studio for Radio Melbourne 3AW between Elwood and St. Kilda, Melbourne, ca. 1965 [picture] nla.pic-vn6001244 ca. 1965 (2012 printing)
- Echuca rodeo, Victoria, ca. 1965 [picture] nla.pic-vn6001248 ca. 1965 (2012 printing)
- Elephant trainer and son, Melbourne, 1971 [picture] nla.pic-vn6001571 1971 (2012 printing)
- Spastic Centre bus, Melbourne, May 1970 [picture] nla.pic-vn6001641 1970 (2012 printing)
- The real Australian, portrait of a man at a bar, Brunswick Street, Fitzroy, Melbourne, 1990 [picture]nla.pic-vn6001684 1990 (2012 printing)
- Maggie Diaz, Port Melbourne, ca. 1965 [picture] nla.pic-vn6001693 ca. 1965 (2012 printing)
- Maggie Diaz working, Chicago, Illinois, ca. 1960 [picture]

== Major media coverage ==
- Botticelli Reimagined, Evans, Weppelman, McMahon and Montua, Victoria and Albert Museum Publishing, London 2016. ISBN 9781851778706
- Pro Photo Magazine – April 2012: Article by Alison Stieven-Taylor. ISSN 0159-8880.
- Pro Photo Magazine – September/October 2011, (Pages 18–20). ISSN 0159-8880
- Ballarat International Foto Biennale Catalogue 2011 (article by Madeleine Say, page 10) ISBN 9780646560434
- Australian Photography Magazine (Pages 29 – 32) "Sweet and Sour" by Robert Keeley September 2009, https://web.archive.org/web/20131018100925/http://maggiediaz.com/Content/News
- Moorabbin Leader – 11 March 2009, "Light shines on gritty collection", https://web.archive.org/web/20131018084901/http://maggiediaz.com/Content/Press
- "Maggie Diaz – Into the Light" Portland Observer, Friday 23 January 2009, https://web.archive.org/web/20131018084901/http://maggiediaz.com/Content/Press
- Free Press Leader, 11 June 2008 "Retrospective Collection" by Zoe Lewis, https://web.archive.org/web/20131018084901/http://maggiediaz.com/Content/Press
- The Weekend Australian Magazine, "Double Take" by Helen O"Neill 6–7 October 2007, https://web.archive.org/web/20131018084901/http://maggiediaz.com/Content/Press
- The Sunday Age, 25 March 2007, Review by Penny Webb "Maggie Diaz, Into the Light" Pg 48
- Bunbury, Stephanie (20 February 2005). "Into the light". The Age.

== See also ==
- Photography in Australia
- Cinema of Australia
- John Watt Beattie
- William Bland
- Jeff Carter (photographer)
- Ken G. Hall
- Frank Hurley
- Charles Kerry
- Henry King (photographer)
- David Perry (Australian filmmaker)
- Ruby Spowart
- Mark Strizic
