= Henry King (photographer) =

Australian photographer

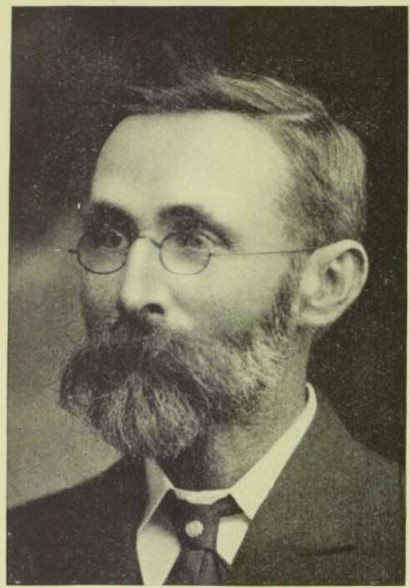
- Born: 1855
- Died: 22 May 1923
- Occupation: Photographer

Henry King (7 March 1855 – 22 May 1923) was an English-born Australian photographer, known for his studies of Australian Aboriginal people and his views of Sydney. King was one of Australia's most significant early photographers, described by the Australian Photographic Review as "stand[ing] high in the esteem of the craft".

== Life ==
Henry King was born in Swanage, Dorset, England, the son of a stonemason, William Isaac King 1832–1916 and his wife Eliza, née Tomes 1834–1912. King's family emigrated to Australia arriving in December 1856. In 1878 he married Elizabeth Lang.

King's career as a photographer began in the Sydney studio of J. Hubert Newman. From 1880 King had his owned studio, initially in partnership with William Slade, at 316 George Street Sydney. Between 1889 and 1894 King travelled widely in New South Wales and Queensland, making many photographic studies of Aboriginal Australians. These were generally half-length portraits, against a painted backdrop. King exhibited some of these portraits at the World Columbian Exposition at Chicago in 1893, receiving a bronze medal. King also printed and exhibited in Chicago many photographs from negatives taken by Reverend W.G. Lawes of people and scenes photographed in New Guinea and islands of the Pacific.

In later years he turned to landscape photography, using the dry-plate technique, and produced a great many scenic views of Sydney. He also photographed notable views around New South Wales, including scenes of Jenolan Caves taken using magnesium flares.

King died on 22 May 1923 aged 68, leaving his wife, a son and three daughters. He was buried at Waverley Cemetery.

After King's death, many of his glass negatives were purchased by J. R. Tyrrell and passed to Consolidated Press Holdings. The Tyrrell Collection, which includes works by a number of Australian photographers, is now held by the Powerhouse Museum.

== Exhibitions and honours ==
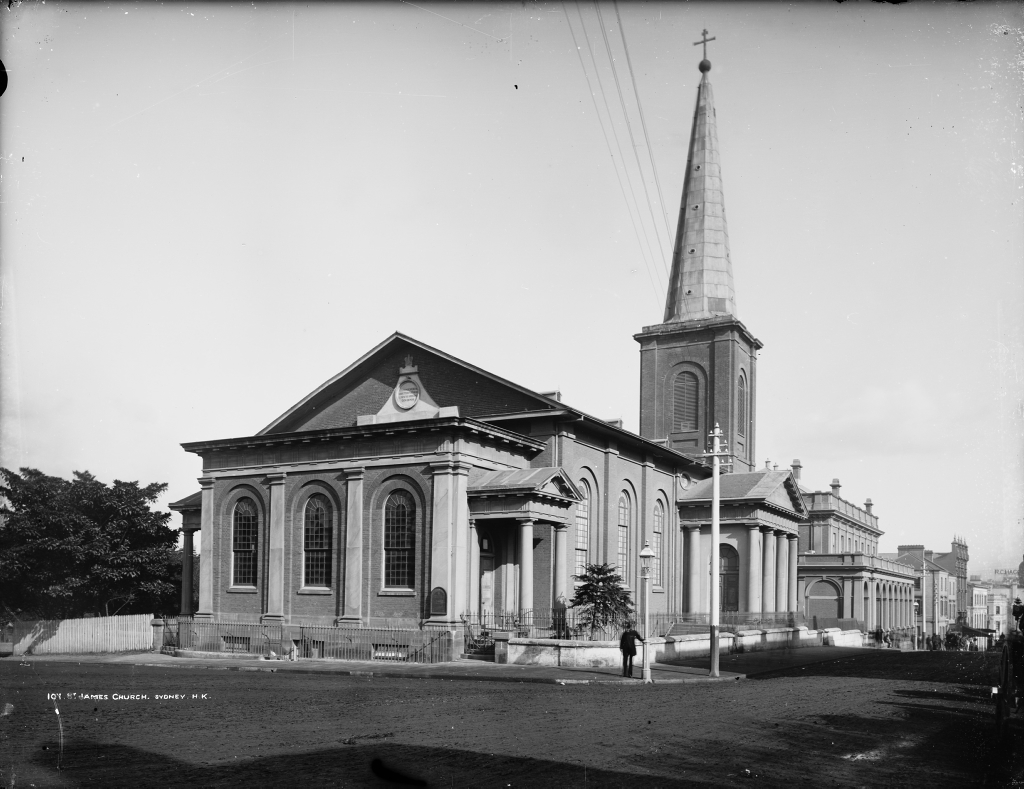
St James' Church, Sydney in about 1890, by Henry King, from negative in the Tyrrell Collection of the Powerhouse Museum

- 1904, the Australian Photographic Review devoted an entire issue to King's photographs
- 1975, the Australian Centre for Photography held an exhibition of his Aboriginal portraits
- His work was commissioned and exhibited by both the Art Gallery of New South Wales and the Society of Artists, Sydney.
- The Powerhouse Museum holds a collection of his photographs and 1,300 glass negatives.
- His work is held by the National Library of Australia

== See also ==
- Photography in Australia
- Cinema of Australia
- John Watt Beattie
- William Bland
- Jeff Carter (photographer)
- Maggie Diaz
- Ken G. Hall
- Frank Hurley
- Charles Kerry
- David Perry (Australian filmmaker)
- Ruby Spowart
- Mark Strizic
