= Jeff Carter (photographer) =

Australian photographer, filmmaker and author

- Born: 5 August 1928; Melbourne
- Died: 25 October 2010 (aged 82); Foxground, New South Wales, Australia
- Education: self-taught
- Known for: Photojournalism
- Notable work: Tobacco Road, Ovens Valley, 1955–1956
- Spouse(s): 1947 Frances Oscar, 1952 Mary Thompson-Read-Young

Jeff Carter (5 August 1928 – 25 October 2010) was an Australian photographer, filmmaker and author. His work was widely published and contributed iconic representation of the working population of the Australian bush as self-sufficient rugged and laconic.

== Early life ==
Carter was born to Percy and Doris Carter in August 1928 in Melbourne. Jeff's parents were successful merchants and Jeff attended Melbourne Boys High School. By the time he matriculated in 1946, his three major passions were clear – photography, writing and travel. He began taking photographs while still at high school. His first photos were taken with a Kodak Box Brownie, given to him as a 13th birthday present.

== Career ==
In 1946, Carter set off to travel around Australia with his camera and typewriter and made a living selling his stories and photographs to a wide range of Australian and international newspapers and magazines including Paris Match, People, Pix, Walkabout and The Australian Women's Weekly. He was later also commissioned by National Geographic. The curator of the 2011 retrospective of Carter's work, Sandra Byron, said his photographs were "deceptively simple because they were extremely well crafted, wonderful images", and that he was an important figure in Australian documentary photography.

From 1949–54, Carter was editor of Outdoors and Fishing magazine; he then resigned to travel in rural and outback Australia as a freelance photo-journalist. He wrote and illustrated 17 books based on his experiences. His most widely held book outside Australia is People of the Inland. [Adelaide]: Rigby, 1966. OCLC 901968. Carter's other books include: The Life and Land of Central Australia (1967); Outback in Focus (1968); Stout Hearts and Leathery Hands (1968); Surf Beaches of Australia's East Coast (1968); Four-Wheel Drive Swagman (1969); Wild Country (1974); Jeff Carter's Great Book Of The Australian Outdoors (1976); All Things Wild (1977); and Jeff Carter's Guided Tours Of The Outback (1979).

At the time of his death in 2010 he was in the final stages of compiling a book of photographic works produced in collaboration with his granddaughter. Carter also produced a three-volume series of semi-autobiographical novels, Snowmaidens, which remained unpublished at the time of his death.

Carter is quoted as saying that he was influenced by writers such as Upton Sinclair, John Steinbeck and Edgar Snow.

== Television ==
From 1972–74, Jeff Carter directed and filmed the television series Wild Country for the Seven Network. The series was edited by Roger Whittaker and Jeff's daughter Karen, and was screened internationally, including at the annual television festival MIP in Cannes, France. An episode won awards for Best Documentary, Best Director and Best Editing at the 1974 Australian Film Institute Awards, and another episode won several awards at the annual television festival MIP in Cannes, France.

From 1981–85, he was head teacher of photography at the Wollongong campus of the National Art School.

== Collections and exhibitions ==
His photographs are in the collections of the Art Gallery of NSW, the National Gallery of Victoria, the National Gallery of Australia, the National Library of Australia (over 450 photographs), the Art Gallery of South Australia, the National Museum of Australia, and the Powerhouse Museum. They have been exhibited at the National Library of Australia, the National Gallery of Australia, the National Museum of Australia, the Art Gallery of NSW, the Art Gallery of South Australia and overseas galleries in Osaka, Japan, Lisbon, Portugal, New York and Paris.

The Monash Gallery of Art in Melbourne, held a major retrospective exhibition of his images in May–June 2003, which was seen by a record number of over 9,000 visitors. Part of this exhibition was then shown at the Christine Abrahams Gallery, and the National Trust Gallery in Melbourne.

Carter received the Australia Council's Visual Arts/Craft Board 2004 Emeritus award. Senator Rod Kemp, then Minister for the Arts and Sport, commented:

The annual Visual Arts/Craft Emeritus Award and Medal honour the achievements of artists and advocates who have made outstanding and lifelong contributions to the arts in Australia. The career of itinerant, self-taught photographer Jeff Carter spans half a century. It has been estimated that he has produced some 55,000 negatives since he took to the road in 1946 as a young man inspired by his heroes Steinbeck and Hemingway. Armed with a typewriter and a 1A folding Kodak camera, he set about on a journey across the country that would see him document the people, places and life of a changing Australia. In doing so, he has produced one of this country's most remarkable and historically significant photographic archives. As his self-titled calling as photographer to the 'poor and unknown' suggests, Carter is a humanist whose early articles and iconic black and white images, like Tobacco Road and The Drover's Wife, exposed an appreciation of the difficulties Australians outside major cities faced everyday.

Helen Ennis's 2004,Intersections: Photography, History and the National Library of Australia, The National Library's compendium of its image collection, uses Carter's iconic 1955 image Tobacco Road for its cover illustration. A collection of his black and white studies was published as Jeff Carter: Retrospective Sydney: New Holland, 2005, ISBN 978-1-74110-213-0

Filmmaker Catherine Hunter joined Carter on a road trip in June 2010 to western New South Wales, revisiting bush characters he had first photographed back in the 1950s. The result was a half-hour documentary, Inland Heart: The Photography of Jeff Carter.

== Themes ==
As a photographer, Carter concentrated on the unglamorous and unprivileged aspects of Australia, with a focus on the working lives and conditions of ordinary Australians. During his early travels, his experiences as an itinerant bush worker, fruit picker, side show "urger" for a travelling boxing troupe, drover, road worker, and mill hand, brought him in contact with the people who would be the subjects of his photographs. These early years of his career filled him with admiration for those making their livings in some of the toughest environments in Australia.

Throughout his career, Carter has produced series that show the progression of events over time. Concentrating on rituals and process, they comprise evocative images.

== Personal life ==
In 1947, at the age of 19, Jeff Carter married Frances Oscar, a motorcycle rider in a circus sideshow and had two children, daughter, Karen Siobhan Carter, and son Thor. In 1952 he began a de facto relationship with Mary Thompson-Read-Young (known as 'Mare'). They settled in 1962 on a 45-hectare farm at Foxground near the south coast town of Berry, NSW and turned it into a wildlife sanctuary. They had two boys, Goth and Vandal.

== Obituary ==
Jeff Carter's obituary, written by Robert McFarlane, appeared in The Sydney Morning Herald on 6 November 2010.

== Books by Jeff Carter ==
- Carter, Jeff & Mossgreen Gallery (2010). Final works from the darkroom. Mossgreen Gallery, South Yarra
- Carter, Jeff & Davies, Alan, 1946– & Byron, Sandra & Willsteed, Theresa & State Library of New South Wales (2010). Beach, bush + battlers : photographs by Jeff Carter. State Library of New South Wales, [Sydney, N.S.W.]
- Carter, Jeff & Gollings, John, 1944– & Parke, Trent, 1971– & Gold Coast City Art Gallery (2008). Streets of gold : photographs from Gold Coast Streets 1957–2008. Gold Coast City Art Gallery, Surfers Paradise [Qld.]
- Carter, Mare & Carter, Jeff, 1928–2010 (2007). Landmarks : in a travelling life. Glenrock Books, Foxground, N.S.W
- Carter, Jeff (2005). Jeff Carter : retrospective. New Holland, Frenchs Forest, N.S.W
- Carter, Jeff (1995). Jeff Carter's Bush Battlers. People of the inland. Seal Books, Sydney
- Carter, Jeff & Primavera Press (1994). Jeff Carter, 1995 : Primavera black & white datebook. Leichhardt [N.S.W.] Primavera Press
- Carter, Jeff & Carter, Mare, 1930– & Carter, Jeff, 1928–2010. (1993). Carters' Central Australia (Rev. ed). Hodder and Stoughton, Sydney
- Carter, Jeff (1989). From the Alice to the Arctic : 40 years of motoring with Jeff Carter. Hodder & Stoughton, Sydney
- Carter, Jeff & Carter, Mare, 1930– (1989). The complete guide to central Australia. Hodder & Stoughton, Sydney
- Carter, Jeff (1987). The Australian explorer's handbook : travel, survival and bush cookery. Hodder and Stoughton, Sydney
- Carter, Jeff (1981). Jeff Carter's Guide to the outdoors. Rigby, Adelaide
- Carter, Jeff (1979). Jeff Carter's guided tours of the outback. Rigby, Adelaide
- Carter, Jeff & Niebuhr, Reinhold, 1892–1971 & Van Dusen, Henry P. (Henry Pitney), 1897–1975 (1977). All things wild : more yarns about wild people, places and animals. Rigby, [Adelaide, Sydney, etc.]
- Carter, Jeff (1977). Jeff Carter's bush battlers. Rigby, Adelaide
- Carter, Jeff (1977). Jeff Carter's new guide to Central Australia. Rigby, Adelaide
- Carter, Jeff (1976). Jeff Carter's great book of the Australian outdoors. Rigby, Adelaide
- Carter, Jeff & Carter, Jeff (1973). Wild animal farm. Hale, London
- Carter, Jeff (1972). A guide to Central Australia. Sun Books, Melbourne
- Carter, Jeff (1972). Wild country. Hale, London
- Carter, Jeff (1971). Ungezähmtes land ('Unfinished Land'). Engelbert, Sauerland, Germany
- Carter, Jeff (1971). The new frontier : Australia's rising northwest. Angus and Robertson, [Sydney]
- Carter, Jeff (1970). Four-wheel drive swagman. Hale, London
- Carter, Jeff (1969). In the steps of the explorers. Angus and Robertson, Sydney
- Carter, Jeff (1968). Surf beaches of Australia's east coast. Angus and Robertson, Sydney
- Carter, Jeff (1968). In the tracks of the cattle : story of the great migration from 11 head at Farm Cove in 1788 to 19 million throughout the cattle lands today. Angus and Robertson, [Sydney]
- Carter, Jeff (1968). Outback in focus. Angus & Robertson, London
- Carter, Jeff (1968). Stout hearts and leathery hands. Angus & Robertson, London
- Carter, Jeff (1967). The life and land of Central Australia. Angus and Robertson, Sydney
- Carter, Jeff (1966). People of the inland. Rigby, [Adelaide]
- Brodsky, Isadore & Carter, Jeff, 1928–2010 & Hunter's Hill (N.S.W. : Municipality). Council (1961). Hunters Hill, New South Wales, 1861–1961. Jukes, Sydney

== Exhibitions of work by Jeff Carter ==
- Focus Oz, 1991–2 – Berry NSW
- Untitled, 1992 – Christine Abrahams Gallery, Melbourne
- Saturday Arvo, 1993 – Stills Gallery, Sydney
- Untitled, 1994 – Christine Abrahams Gallery
- Concerned Viewer, 1995 – Photographers Gallery, Sydney
- Beach, Bush & Battlers, 1995 – Byron-Mapp Gallery, Sydney
- Battlers, 1996 – Christine Abrahams Gallery, 1998 – Byron-Mapp Gallery, 1999 Penrith Regional Gallery, 1999 Brisbane City Art Gallery, 2000 Gippsland Regional Art Gallery, 2002 – Myrtleford, Victoria
- Sydney Images, 1996 – Byron-Mapp Gallery
- A Hungry Eye, 1999 – Dick Bett Gallery, Hobart
- 8 Seconds High!, 1999 – Christine Abrahams Gallery, 2003 – Museum of the Riverina, Wagga, 2003 – Shear Outback, Hay, NSW,
- Selected Images, 1999 – Paris Photo Show
- The Way We Were, 2000 – Byron-Mapp Gallery
- Combined Artists, 2000 – Byron-Mapp Gallery
- Selected Images, 2000 – Paris Photo Show
- Charles Kerry/Jeff Carter, 2001 – Mosman Art Gallery
- Images 1950–2000, 2001 – Christine Abrahams Gallery
- Federation (Contrib. Artist), 2001 – National Gallery of Australia
- Images 1950–2000, 2001 – Byron-Mapp Gallery
- Big River Show (Contrib. Artist), 2002 – Wagga Regional Art Gallery
- Retrospective, 2003 – Monash Gallery of Art, Victoria
- Images 1950–2001 – National Trust Parliament Place Gallery, Melbourne
- Icon Images, 2003 – Christine Abrahams Gallery
- Vintage Images, 2006 – Sandra Byron Gallery, Sydney
- Retrospective Images, 2006 – Christine Abrahams Gallery, Melbourne
- 'La Nieta', 2006 – The Australian Photographers Gallery, Sydney
- Queen Victoria Market Series: 1956, 2008 Queen Victoria Market
- Beach, Bush + Battlers: Photographs by Jeff Carter 2011 – State Library of NSW from 4 January – 20 February

== See also ==
- Photography in Australia
- Cinema of Australia
- John Watt Beattie
- William Bland
- Maggie Diaz
- Ken G. Hall
- Frank Hurley
- Charles Kerry
- Henry King (photographer)
- David Perry (Australian filmmaker)
- Ruby Spowart
- Mark Strizic
