= Ruby Spowart =

Australian photographer (1928–2024)

Ruby Spowart (1928–2024) was an Australian photographer whose award-winning images of outback landscapes are based on some 40 safari tours in Australia and New Zealand. Spowart was a triple Master of Photography, Fellow and Honorary Fellow of the Australian Institute of Professional Photography. She also achieved a Certificate in Art from the Queensland College of Art as well as an Associate Diploma of Visual Art from Queensland University of Technology. Co-founder of the Brisbane Imagery Gallery in 1982, she exhibited there until 1995. From Polaroid colour photograms in the 1980s to large-scale photo mosaics in the 1990s and photobooks since 2000, she has created a considerable body of work. Spowart was a Fellow of the Australian Institute of Professional Photographers (AIPP).

In March 2009, Spowart was one of six Australian female photographers who were celebrated by the AIPP. The others were Bronwyn Kidd, Kate Geraghty, Karen Gowlett-Holmes, Lyn Whitfield-King and Jackie Ranken.

Spowart died in 2024, at the age of 95.

== Work ==
Spowart created an immense body of work in the following techniques: Polaroid 10”x8” colour photograms (1980s), Polaroid SX-70 multi-image (joiner-style works) (1980s), massive pseudo-panorama landscapes (1980s & 90s), camera toss mosaics (1980s & 90s), large-scale photo mosaics (1980s & 90s), artists’ books and photobooks (2000–2012).

Some of Spowart’s work from the AIPP APP Awards success are her most famous, particularly her work with Kodak High Speed Infrared film and Leica M2. Many of the images are of outback Australian landscapes and are mainly sepia toned. Many of her photographs were printed by her son, Doug Spowart. During her career, Spowart has won many awards including several from the McGregor Prize for Photography.

== Publications ==
- Spowart, Ruby; Smith, Sue (1992). Patterns in Time: Ruby Spowart Photographs 1982–1992: a Mid-career Survey Celebrating Ten Years of Images and Concepts. Imagery Gallery. ISBN 978-0-646-12135-2.

== See also ==
- Photography in Australia
- Cinema of Australia
- John Watt Beattie
- William Bland
- Jeff Carter (photographer)
- Maggie Diaz
- Ken G. Hall
- Charles Kerry
- Henry King (photographer)
- David Perry (Australian filmmaker)
- Mark Strizic
