= Burstow (disambiguation) =

Burstow is a parish in Surrey, England.

Burstow may also refer to:

== People with the surname Burstow ==
- Bonnie Burstow (1945–2020), Canadian psychotherapist, author, and anti-psychiatry scholar
- Graham S. Burstow (1927–2022), Australian photographer
- Henry Burstow (1826–1916), British shoemaker
- Mason Burstow (born 2003), English professional footballer
- Paul Burstow (born 1962), British politician
- Stephen Burstow, Australian visual artist and filmmaker, creator of a series of dance films for TV, Seven Deadly Sins (1993)
