= Charles Kerry =

Australian photographer

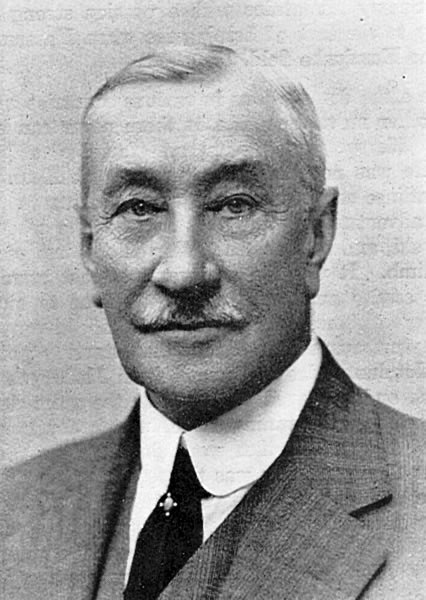
Charles Henry Kerry

Charles Henry Kerry (3 April 1857 – 26 May 1928) was an Australian photographer noted for his photographs that contributed to the development of the Australian national psyche and romance of the bush.

== Early life and career ==
Kerry was born on Bobundra Station in the Monaro region of New South Wales. He began working in the Sydney photo studio of A.H. Lamartiniere in 1875. When Lamartiniere fled from creditors a few years later, Kerry took charge of the company, paying debts and turning around the business. Initially Kerry specialised in portraits but branched into photographing Sydney scenery and society. He was also active in the postcard business. Eventually Kerry turned this small studio into Australia's largest photographic establishment.

== Work and commissions ==
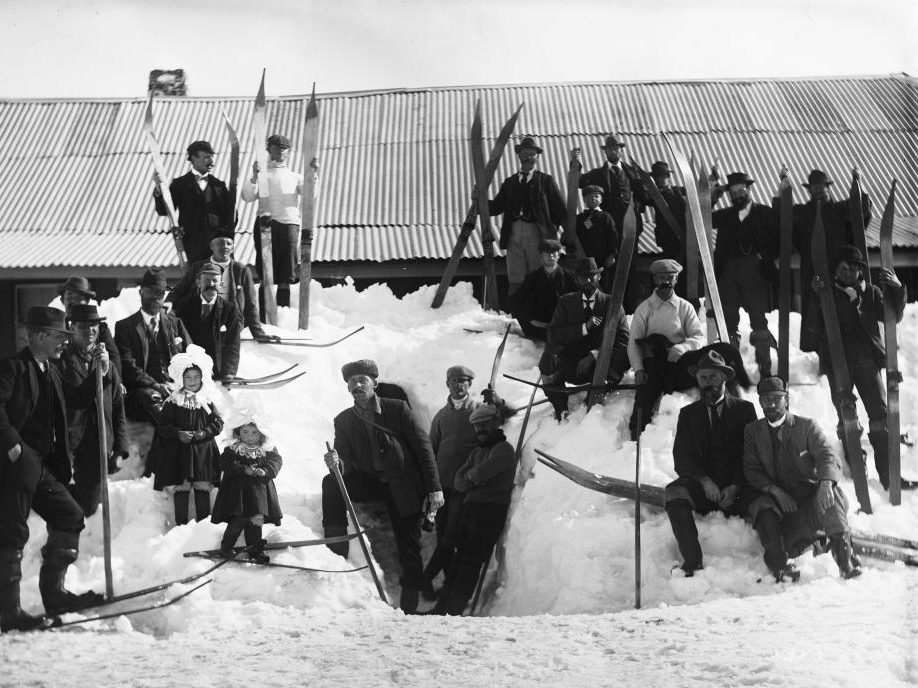
Skiers from the 1900 Kiandra Snow Shoe Carnival by Charles Kerry

In 1885 Kerry was asked to prepare an exhibit of Aboriginal portraits and corroboree pictures for the 1886 Colonial and Indian Exhibition. In 1890, the Governor of New South Wales, Lord Carrington, appointed Kerry as his official photographer.

In 1891 Kerry was commissioned to photograph the Jenolan and Yarrangobilly Caves. An innovative artist, Kerry used the still-experimental technique of magnesium flash powder to capture the interior of the Jenolan Caves. By 1900 Kerry handled the major illustrations for the local press. In 1908 he photographed the visit of the American Fleet and the Burns–Johnson heavyweight boxing match. To gain an aerial view of the arrival of the Great White Fleet he mounted a camera on a box kite.

== Photographic excursions ==
In 1895, Kerry began a Squatter's Service, travelling around the colony photographing squatter's land, homesteads, families and livestock.

Charles Kerry first visited Kiandra in 1894 to pursue his mining interests, he returned in 1896 on a photographic tour. The following year with practically no skiing experience was assisted by group including Kiandra ski club members on an historic photography tour to the summit of Mount Kosciuszko. In 1909 he was elected Founding President of the Kosciusko Alpine Club, which led to the opening up of the area for skiing and the naming of a run after him.

By 1898 he had the largest photographic establishment in Australia, a three floor building at 310 George Street, Sydney.

== Later life ==
He employed professional photographers and after 1895 took fewer photographs himself. He left the firm in 1911 to concentrate on his mining interests.

From 1913 he made a photographic tour of the Pacific, visiting Tonga, New Caledonia, Fiji, New Guinea, the Solomon Islands and Samoa. Later, in 1928 he accompanied a scientific party to the islands of the Great Barrier Reef. He died soon after his return at his home in the Northern Sydney suburb of Neutral Bay.

In 1937 Sir Frank Packer named his son after Kerry. Kerry Packer became Australia's richest man.

Kerry's son G. E. Marni Kerry was an early Australian aviator and friend of Charles Kingsford Smith.

== Collections ==
About 8,000 glass negatives from his studio (including some negatives by Henry King which had been purchased by Kerry) were acquired in 1930 by Tyrrell's Bookshop, and this collection was purchased by Australian Consolidated Press in 1980 and donated to the Powerhouse Museum. Many of these were made freely available in the Commons on Flickr by the Powerhouse Museum in 2008.

== See also ==
- Photography in Australia
- Cinema of Australia
- John Watt Beattie
- William Bland
- Jeff Carter (photographer)
- Maggie Diaz
- Ken G. Hall
- Henry King (photographer)
- David Perry (Australian filmmaker)
- Ruby Spowart
- Mark Strizic

== Sources ==
- Jack Cato (1955), The Story of the Camera in Australia. Melbourne: Institute of Australian Photographers.
- David P. Millar (1981), Charles Kerry's Federation Australia. Sydney: David Ell Press.
- Keast Burke, 'Kerry, Charles Henry (1857–1928)', Australian Dictionary of Biography, Volume 9, Melbourne University Press, 1983, pp 577–578.
- Norman W Clarke (2006), "Kiandra – Gold Fields to Ski Fields".
