= James Kelly Basin =

Bay in Tasmania, Australia

Coordinates: 43°16′S 145°53′E

James Kelly Basin is a bay inside Port Davey in South West Tasmania, in the Southwest National Park. It lies below Davey Head (346m), and opens into Payne Bay, a northern arm of Port Davey that is west of Bathurst Harbour. It was named after James Kelly, an early explorer of the Tasmanian coastline.

A similar named feature in Macquarie Harbour to the north on the West Coast, and not to be confused is called Kelly Basin.
