= Ettie Stewart Steele =

British chemist

Janette 'Ettie' Stewart Steele
- Born: 5 October 1890; Dunfermline
- Died: July 1983 (aged 92)
- Education: University of St Andrews
- Parent(s): William Steele and Jessie Steele

Janette 'Ettie' Stewart Steele (5 October 1890 – July 1983) was a British chemist. She submitted the first PhD thesis at the University of St Andrews and worked there for the rest of her career in several roles including University Assistant, Lecturer, Warden of the women's students residence, and secretary to Principal James Irvine.

== Early life and education ==
Ettie Steele was born in Dunfermline on 5 October 1890. She attended Dunfermline High School before matriculating at The University of St Andrews in 1908, where she received an M.A. in 1912, followed by a B.Sc in 1914.

== Career ==
After graduating, she began working with Principal James Irvine on the configuration of alkylated sugars as determined by their conductivity in the presence of boric acid. Her research was carried out in the Chemical Research Laboratory over 19 terms, interrupted by war work. She held a Carnegie Research Scholarship in 1915-16 and 1916–17, and a Fellowship in 1917-18 and 1918-19. She submitted a Ph.D thesis titled 'The Structure of Mannitol' in 1919, becoming the first candidate to submit a thesis for the degree of PhD at the University of St Andrews. She graduated with Dr Grace Cumming Leitch as the earliest PhDs in 1920.

She became the first female lecturer in Chemistry at the University of St Andrews in 1920 and was warden of Chattan House, later McIntosh Hall, 1930–59. She worked closely with Principal Irvine in both research and administration, acting as his secretary. In retirement she became ‘bursar of residences’.

== Legacy ==
The School of Chemistry at the University of St Andrews has a reading room named after Dr Steele.
