= Kelly Basin =

Bay in Tasmania, Australia

Coordinates: 42°20′S 145°34′E

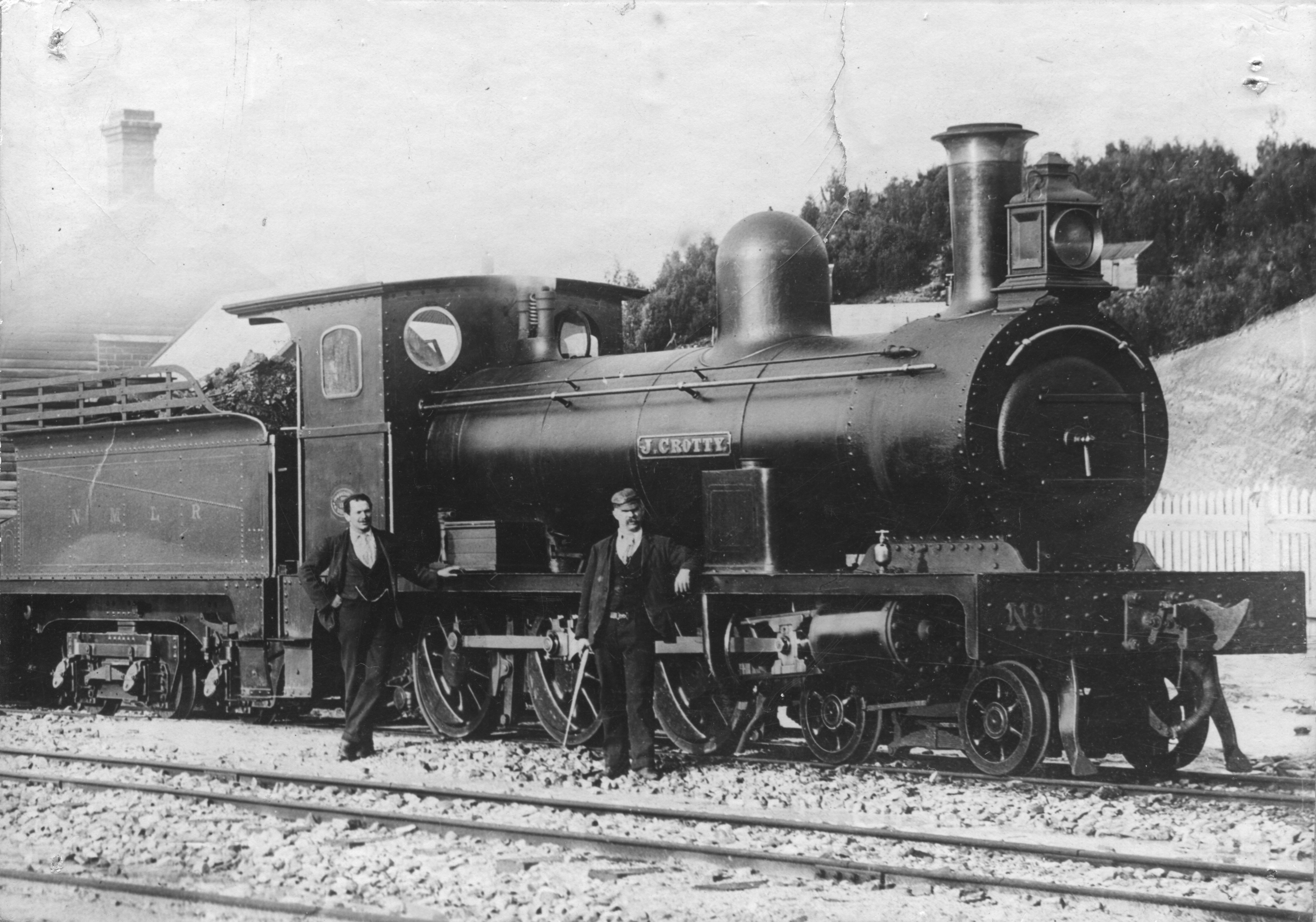
North Mount Lyell Railway Avonside 4-6-0 No. 1 "J. Crotty" at Kelly Basin, circa 1900

Kelly Basin is a bay on the south eastern side of Macquarie Harbour on the West Coast of Tasmania. It was named after James Kelly an early explorer of the Tasmanian coastline. It was the location of the terminus of the North Mount Lyell Railway and the town of Pillinger.

In the late 1890s, when John Watt Beattie was showing his photographs of the west coast country to Hobart and Launceston audiences, the bay was designated as Kelly's Basin.

The North Mount Lyell Railway closed in the 1920s. The route of the former railway line, now known as 'Kelly Basin Road', was the land route to the bay.

In the 1990s, following the failure of the Franklin Dam project to proceed, parts of the Kelly Basin and Bird River area became part of reserves associated with the western boundary of the new South West World Heritage Wilderness area.

The very similarly named James Kelly Basin is further south at Port Davey in the Southwest National Park.
