= Dunfermline High School =

Coordinates: 56.0622°N 3.4507°W

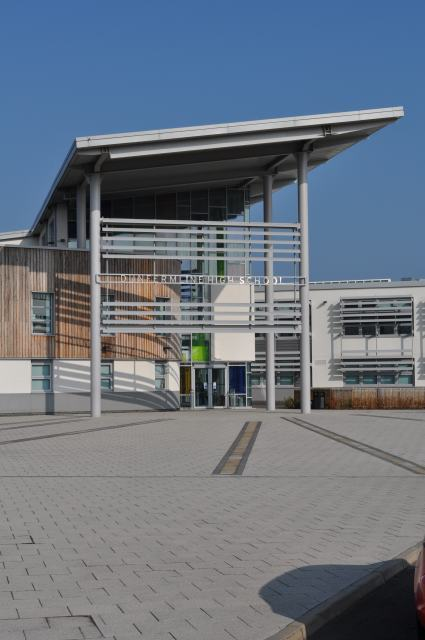

Location
- Jennie Rennies Road; Dunfermline, Fife, KY11 3BQ; Scotland

Information
- Type: Non-denominational
- Motto: a) Labor omnia vincit (Work conquers everything) b) Quid agis age pro viribus (Do everything with enthusiasm) c) Don't wish for it, work for it
- Established: 1468
- Founder: Richard de Bothwell
- Local authority: Fife Council
- Rector: Iain Yuile
- Enrolment: 1,750
- Website: https://www.dunfermlinehigh.co.uk/

Dunfermline High School is one of four main high schools located in Dunfermline, Fife, Scotland. The school also caters for pupils from Kincardine, Rosyth and surrounding villages. The school was founded in 1468. Today it has over 1,550 pupils. The current Rector is Iain Yuile.

== History ==
Education in Dunfermline can be traced back to the founding of a monastic grammar school within Dunfermline Abbey in 1120. King David I (son of Queen Margaret and Malcolm Canmore) initially put up the money to found a school as part of the wider operations of Dunfermline Abbey in the early 1120s.

In 1468, the will of the Abbot Richard de Bothwell made provision for a house and income for a schoolmaster. Burgh records from 1525 refer to the town school. Town and Abbey schools functioned in parallel until 1560 when the Abbey and its school were destroyed during the reformation. Although the school in the town was established separate from the Abbey, it maintained a strong link.

The makar Robert Henryson was one of the first people to hold the title "Master" of the town school. The school buildings were destroyed by fire in 1624. The school was reconstituted by Queen Anne of Denmark in the 16th century. It is from these people, who shaped the school in the first 800 years of its life, that the house names come from: Canmore, Queen Margaret, Bothwell, and Henryson. Denmark house ceased to exist after restructuring of the school. The school went on to be known as the High School.

In June 1939, a new building opened. When a new building was constructed in 2012, this was demolished to become playing fields.

The school celebrated 500 years since its official foundation in 1968.

In August 2012, the brand new £40 million Dunfermline High School was opened to pupils after many years of planning and construction.

In June 2016 Iain Yuile was announced as Rector of the school.

== Catchment Area ==
The school mainly enrols pupils from primary schools in Dunfermline however certain exceptions do exist.

The school's feeder primary schools are:

Within Dunfermline:

- Canmore Primary School
- Commercial Primary School
- Masterton Primary School
- Pitreavie Primary School
- St Leonard's Primary School

Outwith Dunfermline:

- Limekilns Primary School, Limekilns

== Facilities ==
Facilities include a five-a-side football pitch; a main football pitch; meeting room; free parking spaces on site; sports hall, fitness room and an assembly hall with a stage.

== School Emblem and Uniform ==
The school’s coat of arms is made up of the arms of the former burgh of Dunfermline on the dexter half of the escutcheon (left side for viewer) and on the sinister side (right for the viewer) the attributed arms of Saint Margaret of Scotland together with the symbol of Richard de Bothwell, Abbot of Dunfermline and founder of the school. The two main colours featured on the school’s uniform, such as blazers and ties, are black and gold. In 2008, a second 'senior tie' was introduced which features the school's arms.

== School motto ==
The school has two Latin mottos:

1. Quid agis age pro viribus, meaning "Everything you do, do it with vigour".
2. Labor Omnia Vincit, meaning "Work conquers everything".

== Notable alumni ==
- Denise Coffey, English actress
- George Cunningham (1931–2018), Labour MP for Islington South West, then Islington South and Finsbury, 1970–83
- Barbara Dickson (born 1947), Singer and actress
- Greg Fleming (born 1986), football goalkeeper (notably Gretna, Ayr Utd)
- Phil Gallie (1939–2011), Conservative Member of Parliament (MP) for Ayr 1992–97 and Member of the Scottish Parliament for the South Scotland region 1999–2007
- Ncuti Gatwa (born 1992), actor
- Malcolm Grant (born 1944), Anglican priest
- Shirley Henderson (born 1965), Scottish actress
- Ian Jack (1945–2022), journalist and writer who edited the Independent on Sunday 1991–95 and Granta 1995–2007
- Sir William Kininmonth (1904–1988), architect who mixed a modern style with Scottish vernacular
- Billy Liddell (1922–2001), Scottish footballer who played his entire professional career with Liverpool F.C.
- Tom Nairn (1932–2023), Scottish political theorist of nationalism
- Thomas Shaw, 1st Baron Craigmyle (1850–1937), radical Liberal Party politician, MP for Hawick Burghs 1892–1909, and Law Lord 1909–29
- James Shearer (1881–1962), architect
- Moira Shearer, Lady Kennedy (1926–2006), ballet dancer and actress.
- Alexander Simpson (1905–1975), first-class cricketer
- Thomas Spowart (1903–1971), first-class cricketer
- Ettie Stewart Steele (1890–1983), chemist, the first student to submit a PhD thesis at the University of St Andrews
- Alan Turnbull, Lord Turnbull, lawyer, and Senator of the College of Justice, a judge of Scotland's Supreme Courts
- Michael Scott Weir (1925–2006), United Kingdom's ambassador to Egypt 1979–1985
- Craig Wilson (born 1986), footballer (notably Dunfermline, Raith)
- Andrew Wyllie CBE (born 1962), civil engineer, CEO of the Costain Group and 154th president of the Institution of Civil Engineers.

== See also ==
- List of the oldest schools in the United Kingdom
- List of the oldest schools in the world
