= Graham S. Burstow =

Australian photographer (1927–2022)

Graham S. Burstow OAM
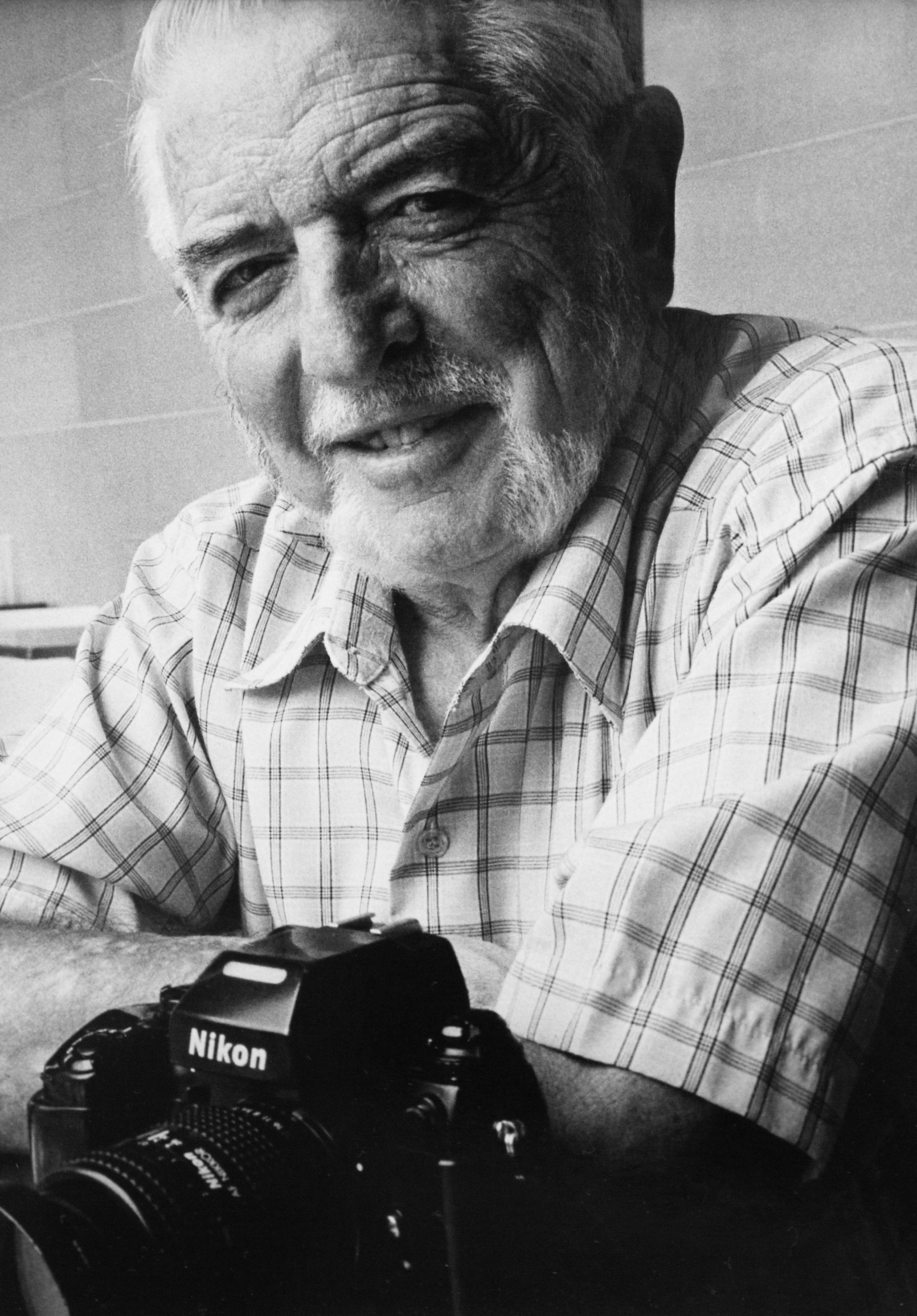
- Born: 8 February 1927; Toowoomba, Queensland, Australia
- Died: 12 August 2022 (aged 95)
- Occupations: photographer, engineer, company director

Graham Stephen Burstow OAM (8 February 1927 – 12 August 2022) was an Australian photographer. He is known both for his photographic practice and for his service to organisations and photographic competitions, for which he received a Medal of the Order of Australia in 2004. He exhibited widely, both in Australia and overseas, and there are several photographic books devoted to his work. He was known for his documentation of Queensland's Gold Coast's beach culture.

== Early life and education ==
Graham Stephen Burstow was born in the Queensland regional city of Toowoomba on 8 February 1927.

He was educated at the Toowoomba Grammar School and the University of Queensland, where he studied mechanical engineering. He completed his engineering studies at the Toowoomba Foundry.

== Career ==
Burstow worked as an engineer at the Toowoomba Foundry for 15 years, before joining the family business in 1961 to manage its floor covering operations.

=== Early photography ===
At 17 years of age, Burstow learnt some camera and darkroom techniques from his younger brother, Sydney, who had joined the Toowoomba Grammar School's newly-formed camera club. Burstow soon became the official photographer of his local tennis club and choral society. Determined to explore the medium further, he joined the Toowoomba Photographic Society in 1947 and was encouraged by winning awards at several international photographic salons with his black and white landscape prints.

=== From medium to 35mm film format ===
In 1973 there was a major shift in Burstow's photography through the intervention of friend and photographer, John F. Williams. Up to this time, Burstow had been using medium format film in comparatively bulky, twin lens reflex cameras. Unsolicited, Williams sent Burstow a 35mm Pentax ES camera, including a wide angled 28mm lens. With the camera came the message: “Graham, this is your new camera… I want you to discover the world of the 28mm lens.” Burstow credited this lighter weight camera and wider lens with inspiring his exploration of social documentary photography, enabling him to move closer to his subjects, engaging people face-to-face and observing complex social interactions.

He became known for his documentation of the Gold Coast's beach culture.

== Exhibitions ==
=== Imagery Gallery ===
Between 1982 and 1988, Burstow exhibited seven times at the Imagery Gallery in South Brisbane, a photography gallery directed by Ruby and Doug Spowart. This included his first solo exhibition Within Reach, in 1982, showing 55 black and white prints that were predominantly images of people.

=== Journeys North exhibitions ===
In the mid-1980s, the Queensland Art Gallery (now QAGOMA) commissioned six photographers, including Burstow, to produce portfolios on the theme of community life in Queensland. The resulting exhibition, titled Journeys North, was held in 1988 with a re-staging, Journeys North Revisited, in 2016. In the foreword to the original exhibition's publication, Doug Hall, AM, then director of the Gallery, wrote that Journeys North was "one of the most adventurous commissions undertaken by the Queensland Art Gallery". The other commissioned photographers were Lin Martin, Rob Mercer, Glen O’Malley, Charles Page, and Max Pam. For his portfolio, Burstow mostly photographed at small-scale outdoor events in south-east Queensland with his photographs giving prominence to onlookers as well as participants. The gallery acquired 57 prints from Burstow's portfolio for its permanent collection. The Queensland Art Gallery also included Burstow's work in its 1995 survey exhibition: The Power to Move, Aspects of Australian Photography.

=== Icons on Icons exhibition ===
Staged at the Cobb & Co branch of the Queensland Museum, Toowoomba, Icons on Icons was a particularly significant group exhibition for Burstow. The exhibition, held in 2013, featured the work of five photographers with strong connections to Toowoomba whose work had achieved national and international recognition. Aside from Burstow, the other photographers were John Elliott, Victoria Cooper, Doug Spowart and David Seeto. For this exhibition, Burstow, as well as showing recent work, returned to family portraits taken in the 1960s, and for the first time made large inkjet prints, without cropping, from the original medium format negatives. These prints are now in the collection of the State Library of Queensland.

=== Retrospective and Gold Coast exhibitions ===
A retrospective exhibition of Burstow's work, titled Sometimes a Light, was staged in 2002 by the Toowoomba Regional Art Gallery, curated by photographer Charles J. Page. Images taken over many decades at the Gold Coast were included in this exhibition and positive responses from viewers encouraged Burstow to research a survey of his Gold Coast photography. With the assistance of his daughter, and author, Narelle Oliver, this research resulted in the exhibition Flesh: The Gold Coast in the 1960s, 70s, and 80s, held at the Brisbane Powerhouse in 2014. The exhibition showcased 84 black and white prints and was accompanied by the publication of the book of the same title by the University of Queensland Press. An expanded iteration of the exhibition, which included an extensive public program of talks and workshops, was curated by Virginia Rigney, and staged at the Gold Coast City Gallery (now HOTA) in 2015.

== Publications ==
In addition to Burstow's Gold Coast photo book, he published two other books of his photography: Touch Me in 1998, and Closer in 2020.

His images can also be found in many image-based anthologies and books surveying photography in Australia.

== Services to photography ==
Living in a regional area, Burstow became aware of the need to create opportunities for communication between photographers through photographic organisations. He also understood the importance of establishing exhibitions, competitions and events for them to show their work.

=== Organisations ===
Burstow joined the Toowoomba Photographic Society in 1947 and in 1962 became one of the founding members of the Australian Photographic Society (APS). He went on to serve as APS President from 1982 to 1984 and was the APS Print Division chairman for ten years. In 2006 he was made an Honorary Life Member of APS and on 25 May 2022, he participated in the APS LIVE 2022 online 60th anniversary event.

=== Competitions ===
Between 1962 and 1974, Burstow was the chairman of one national, and six international photographic salons. Although staged in the regional centre of Toowoomba, these salons regularly attracted thousands of international as well as local entries.

Burstow's longest association with a photographic competition was with the Heritage Bank Photographic Awards, established in 1988, for which he performed various roles, including chief judge, up until 2022.

== Awards and honours ==
In 1974 Burstow was awarded a Commonwealth Medal for services to Amateur Photography.

In 2004 he was awarded the Medal of the Order of Australia, for "service to photography through administrative roles with photographic associations and as an exhibitor and curator".

He was the first Queenslander to achieve a Fellowship in each of the Australian, British, and American Photographic Societies.

== Death and legacy ==
Burstow died on 12 August 2022.

He inspired many photographers through his lecturing and mentoring. Queensland-based photographer John Elliot spoke of how he "certainly was an inspiration because as a photographer myself, I always aspired to take the sort of pictures he was taking."

Burstow's legacy also continues through the staging of posthumous exhibitions, the establishment of memorial prizes in photographic competitions, and through the large number of black and white prints that are held in Australian public collections.

The Australian Photographic Society has established the Graham Burstow Street Photography in Monochrome Prize in recognition of his promotion of social documentary photography within the society.

Burstow's contribution to the Heritage Bank Photographic Awards has been acknowledged through the instituting of the Graham Burstow Memorial Award.

In February 2023, the Toowoomba Regional Art Gallery staged the exhibition The Photographer: Graham S. Burstow 1927–2022 with a selection of Burstow’s prints from its permanent collection.

In October 2024, the Maud Street Photo Gallery in Newstead, Queensland, staged the exhibition: Graham Burstow: Unseen, curated by his granddaughter Mikaela Burstow. The exhibition featured 21 previously unpublished social documentary photographs taken by Burstow in south-east Queensland in the 1970s and 80s.

== Personal life ==
Burstow's annual holiday visits to Queensland's Gold Coast, that began when he was a child and continued with his wife and three children, were crucial for his photography.

== Collections ==
- Home of the Arts (HOTA) Gold Coast, Queensland.
- Queensland Art Gallery and Gallery of Modern Art (QAGOMA), Brisbane, Queensland
- Queensland State Library, Brisbane, Queensland
- National Library of Australia, Canberra
- Toowoomba Regional Art Gallery, Queensland
- Private collections

== Books by Burstow ==
- Touch Me: photographs by Graham Burstow Toowoomba, Queensland: Top Shelf Publications, 1998.
- Flesh: The Gold Coast in the 1960s, 70s and 80s St Lucia, Queensland: University of Queensland Press, 2014.
- Closer Balmain, New South Wales: Graham Burstow, 2020.

== Selected books with photographs by Burstow ==
- Australian Photography Sydney, New South Wales: Globe Publishing, 1976. Edited by Laurence Le Guay.
- Australian Photography: a contemporary view Sydney, New South Wales: Globe Publishing, 1978. Edited by Laurence Le Guay.
- Christmas in Australia Sydney, New South Wales: Hutchison, 1990. Edited by Malcolm McGregor.
- Gold Coast: City and Architecture London, England: Lund Humphries, 2018. By Andrew Leach
