= Superscan =

SuperScan
- Developer: Foundstone
- Final release: 4.0 / 2003
- Operating system: Windows 2000/XP/Vista/7
- Available in: English
- Type: Network tool : Port scanner
- License: Freeware

SuperScan is a free connect-based port scanning software designed to detect open TCP and UDP ports on a target computer, determine which services are running on those ports, and run queries such as whois, ping, ICMP traceroute, and Hostname lookups.

Superscan 4, which is a completely rewritten update to the other Superscan (version 3, released in 2000), features windows enumeration, which can list a variety of important information dealing with Microsoft Windows such as:

- NetBIOS information
- User and Group Accounts
- Network shares
- Trusted Domains
- Services - which are either running or stopped

Superscan is a tool used by system administrators, crackers and script kiddies to evaluate a computer's security. System administrators can use it to test for possible unauthorised open ports on their computer networks, whereas crackers use it to scan for insecure ports in order to gain illegal access to a system.
