= Doug Spowart =

Australian photographer (born 1953)

- Born: 1953 (age 72–73); Victoria, Australia
- Occupations: Photographer, tafe teacher, author
- Years active: since 1979
- Known for: landscape photography
- Partner: Victoria Cooper
- Website: cooperandspowart.com.au

Notes
- Doug Spowart CV

Doug Spowart (born 1953) is an Australian photographer. He has a Master of Photography and is an Honorary Fellow of the Australian Institute of Professional Photography (AIPP). His work has been exhibited in Australia and internationally. He is the author of numerous photography books and artist books. His artist books are held in gallery collections throughout Australia.

== Early life ==
Spowart was born in 1953 in Numurkah, Victoria, the son of Mervyn and Ruby Spowart. His mother Ruby is an art photographer.

Spowart completed his initial photographic training at the Queensland College of Art in the early 1970s. He has continued with his education throughout the years he has worked as a professional photographer. In 1995 he completed an Associate Diploma of Arts at the Southern Queensland Institute of TAFE. He followed this with a Graduate Diploma, Visual Art (Photography) at Monash University. In 2013 he was awarded a PhD in Visual Art from James Cook University.

== Career ==
Spowart worked for Kodak Australasia Pty Ltd for nine years where in the role of Literature and Technical Officer, he controlled the technical documents from motion picture X-ray through to graphic arts and consumer products.

From 1980 to 1995, Ruby and Doug Spowart established the Imagery Gallery in South Brisbane, which focussed on exhibitions of photography, conducting photographic workshops and tours, and the supply of specialised photographic products, such as Leica, Sinar and Metromedia NECO Superscan murals. Fromm 1980 to 1982, the Imagery Gallery was located in the heritage-listed former Queensland National Bank on the corner of Grey and Melbourne Streets. From 1985 to 1995, the gallery operated from the heritage-listed former Commonwealth Bank at 149 Melbourne Street.

From 1995 to 2013, Spowart taught photography at the Southern Queensland Institute of TAFE while concurrently conducting a professional partnership with Victoria Cooper creating artists' books, exhibitions and place-making project. Nocturne Grafton was a project connecting the community of Grafton, their stories contributed via social media, responding to photos of Grafton taken in dusk lighting conditions. Similar place-making projects have taken place in Muswellbrook, Bundaberg, and Miles.

Since 2013, Spowart has been an independent researcher in photo books and artists' books as a Siganto Foundation Artists' Book Research Fellow based at the State Library of Queensland.

== Selected works ==
- Toowoomba water 2011.
- Fuzzy bookish images: a photobookwork 2006.
- Me & my shadow : putting one's self in the tourist picture / concepts and photo-images 2003.
- Sun Painting 1990.

== Awards ==
- Winner AIPP Queensland Photographic Book Photographer of the Year (2010 & 2011).
- Finalist Libris Awards: The Australian Artists Book Prize (2006)
- Winner AIPP Queensland Professional Photographer of the Year (5 times: 1995, 1994, 1992, 1991 & 1990).
- Winner AIPP Queensland Landscape Photographer of the Year (4 times: 1999, 1998, 1996, 1995).
