= Thomas Spowart =

Scottish cricketer

Personal information
- Full name: Thomas Spowart
- Born: 24 March 1903; Dunfermline, Fife, Scotland
- Died: 17 May 1971 (aged 68); Edinburgh, Midlothian, Scotland
- Batting: Right-handed

Domestic team information
- Years: Team
- 1932–1938: Scotland

Career statistics
Competition	First-class
Matches	4
Runs scored	98
Batting average	14.00
100s/50s	–/1
Top score	66
Catches/stumpings	–/–
- Source: Cricinfo, 19 June 2022

Thomas Spowart (24 March 1903 — 12 May 1971) was a Scottish first-class cricketer and educator.

Spowart was born at Dunfermline in March 1903, where he was educated in the town at Dunfermline High School, before matriculating to the University of Edinburgh. A club cricketer for Fifeshire Cricket Club, whom he captained, Spowart made his debut for Scotland in first-class cricket against the touring South Americans at Edinburgh in July 1932. Later that month he played against the touring Indians at Dundee, with his next appearance coming two years later against the touring Australians at Edinburgh. Spowart made his fourth and final first-class appearance for Scotland in 1938, against Ireland at Glasgow. He scored 98 runs in his five first-class matches at an average of exactly 14; his highest score of 66 came on debut against the South Americans. Outside of cricket, Spowart was a schoolmaster. He died at Edinburgh in May 1971.
