= John Watt Beattie =

Australian photographer

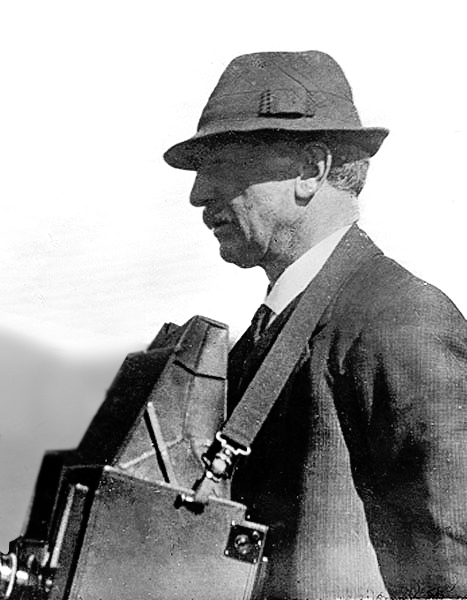
- John Watt Beattie in 1920
- Born: 15 August 1859; Aberdeen
- Died: 24 June 1930 (aged 70); Hobart
- Education: autodidact
- Known for: Landscape photography
- Spouse: Emily Cox Cato
- Awards: 1890: Fellow, Royal Society of Tasmania; 1996: Photographer to the Government of Tasmania

John Watt Beattie (15 August 1859 – 24 June 1930) was an Australian photographer.

== Origin ==
John Beattie was born on 15 August 1859 in Aberdeen, Scotland, to Esther Imlay (née Gillivray) and John Beattie (1820-1883). Beattie had a grammar-school education and in 1878, aged nineteen, migrated with his parents to Tasmania where he started a farm in the Derwent Valley from where wrote to his father decrying his prospects.

== Photographer ==
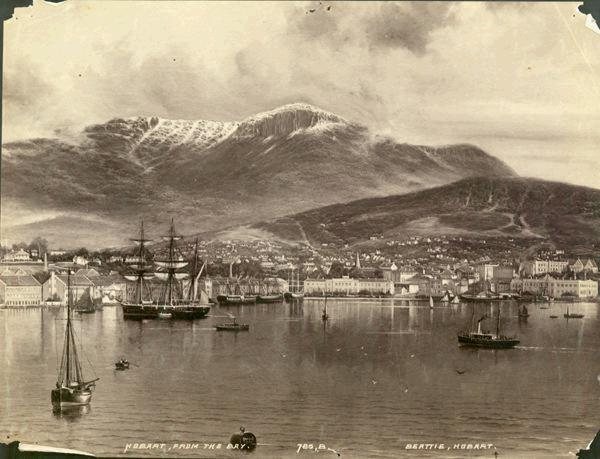
John Watt Beattie (1890) Hobart from the Harbour

=== Indigenous subjects ===
From 1879 Beattie took up photography and was a friend of early photographer Louisa Anne Meredith in the 1880s; he records her giving him assistance, and of her showing him the "many specimens of both her own and the Bishop Nixon's photographic work in those early days of the very black art," and that she had been "instrumental in having the last remnant of the Tasmanian Aboriginals photographed for the purposes of science;" in March 1858, amateur photographer Francis Russell Nixon, the Bishop of Van Diemen's Land had captured images of nine individuals belonging to the Oyster Cove group, photographs which remained relatively obscure until Beattie reproduced copies of them for the tourist industry, using his own name. Beattie also replicated professional carte-de-visite portraits taken by Charles A. Woolley in August 1866 depicting the five surviving members of the Oyster Cove group; well-known, they depict Truganini (known as Lallah Rookh), Bessy Clarke, and King Billy (William Lanne), which he continued to reprint into the 1890s, and to distribute as lantern slides. It is likely he printed from the original glass negative purchased by the Anson brothers from Charles A. Woolley and, as he did with Thomas James Nevin’s and Samuel Clifford’s originals, reproducing them mostly without crediting them as the original photographer, and from 1891 no attribution to Woolley was ascribed when his group portrait was included in an expensive album Aborigines of Australia purchased by collector David Scott Mitchell.

=== Landscape ===
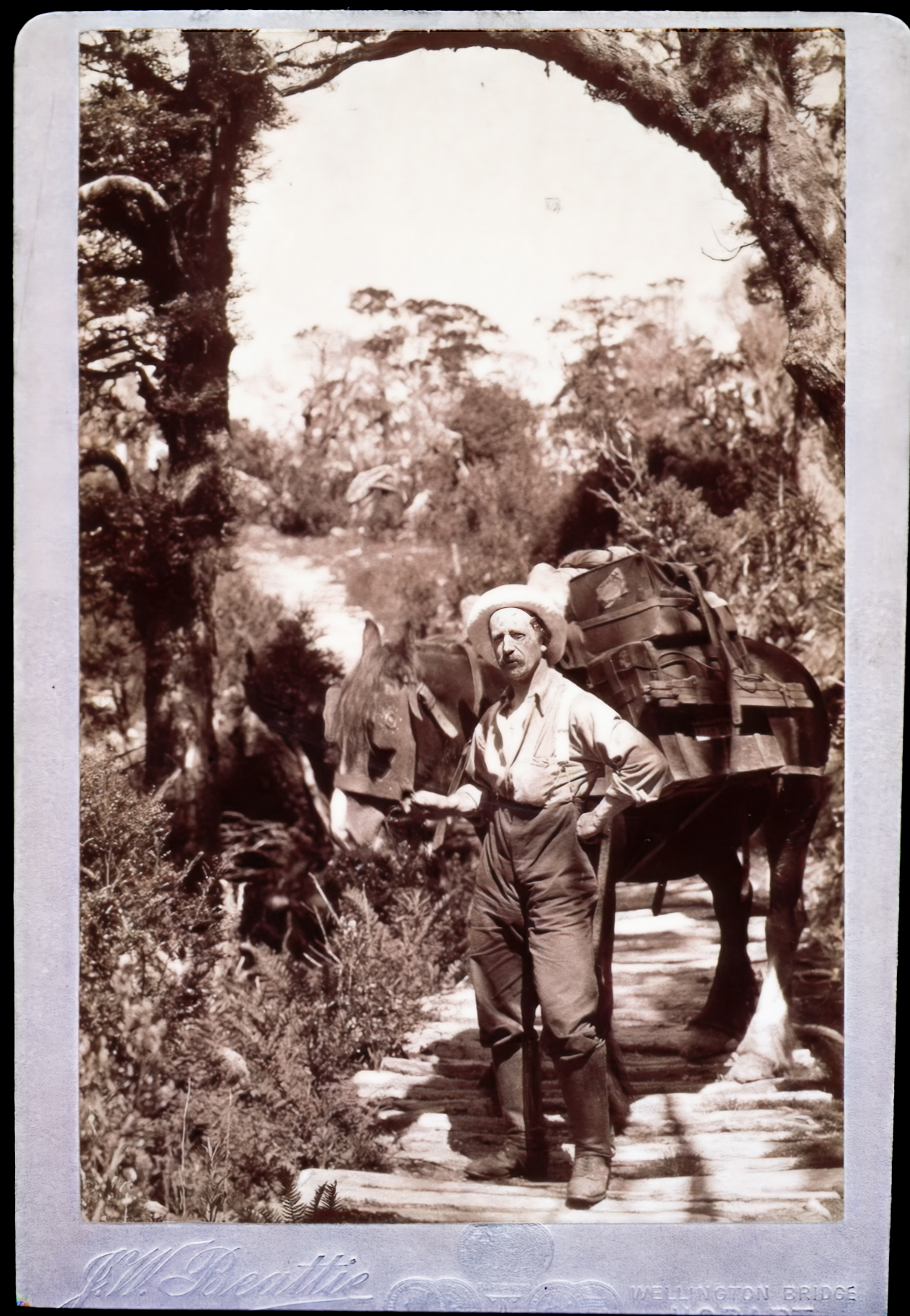
J. W. Beattie standing and holding a laden pack horse on a bush track. Sepia-toned cabinet card with photographer's signature embossed L.L. Allport Library and Museum of Fine Arts, State Library of Tasmania.

In 1882 set up in partnership with Anson Bros. who produced scenic views and whose enterprise he took over in 1891, including their negatives from which he made prints, selling them under his own name. He married Emily Cox (née Cato) in 1886. Cato describes Beattie's expansion of the Anson studios into a "huge business" over three storeys:

John took over the whole building. The shops were turned into exhibition rooms, one for landscapes, and the other for portraits and groups. The basement was used for making and mixing chemicals and sensitising printing papers. There was a large framing department, and workrooms and darkrooms, the Beattie Lending Library, the Beattie Museum of Van Diemen’s Land relics, a huge studio where groups of seventy or eighty people could be taken, and access to a roof top for sun printing.

Committed to Theosophy as a founding member its lodge in Hobart in the early 1890s, and an acolyte of Tasmanian-born painter William Pigeunit, Beattie depicted scenes of the island's beauty in the latter's romantic style for his prints, postcards, lantern-slides and albums. In the 1880s and 1890s he hiked to some wild and rugged places carrying photographic equipment weighing more than 27 kilograms, because "nothing gives me greater delight than to stand on the top of some high land, and look out on a wild array of our mountain giants. I am struck dumb, but oh, how my soul sings."

==== Conservation vs. exploitation ====
Undertaking extensive photography around Tasmania, as well as in the Central Highlands and on the West Coast of Tasmania, Beattie was employed by the mining company North Mount Lyell to photograph between Gormanston and Kelly Basin in the 1890s. Though Hore notes that Beattie warned that within just a "few years the highlands of Lyell will be bare desolate wastes," Davidson asserts that he "saw no contradiction in [photographing for] conservation, development and tourism," and Ennis reports that he "always carried an axe that he used to overcome any faults in his compositions," and would move grass trees or pandanus in to frame the scene. Haynes, however, considers that his successful lobbying for protection of the Gordon River and surrounds for their tourist value positions him as an environmental activist; he presented on the subject of the preservation of "scenery" to the Royal Society in 1908:

…even in England a society has been formed for the preservation of Swiss scenery. How much greater is the necessity existent in a country like Tasmania […] to preserve by every means within her power attractions without which [tourism] would diminish rather than increase, to the serious loss of the state […] a public awakening may be better aroused by a proposition in this form rather than from a more scientific standpoint.

Long notes that Beattie commissioned watercolours thought to be by his friend Haughton Forrest showing "scenes which only existed as written descriptions". Ayling, Smith and Malik reveal several instances where Forrest used Beattie's photographs of remote areas as sources for his paintings throughout the 1890s, and Beattie made reproductions of them.

Nathan Oldham of the Royal Society of Tasmania, in moving in 1937 for a memorial to Beattie, noted that he was "the prime mover in having Freycinet Peninsula declared a game sanctuary, and had done much in finding out the beauty spots of Tasmania". Hutton and Connors argue that Beattie, by using the new technology of photographic lantern slides "to convince his audience of the beauty of remote areas and the need for their protection" was likely "the first' who appreciated their promotional value of the medium, followed by the Hobart Walkers Club's 1950s campaign for the preservation of Lake Pedder, and the Wilderness Society in the 1980s, using the later format of 35mm slides and video.

=== Portraits ===
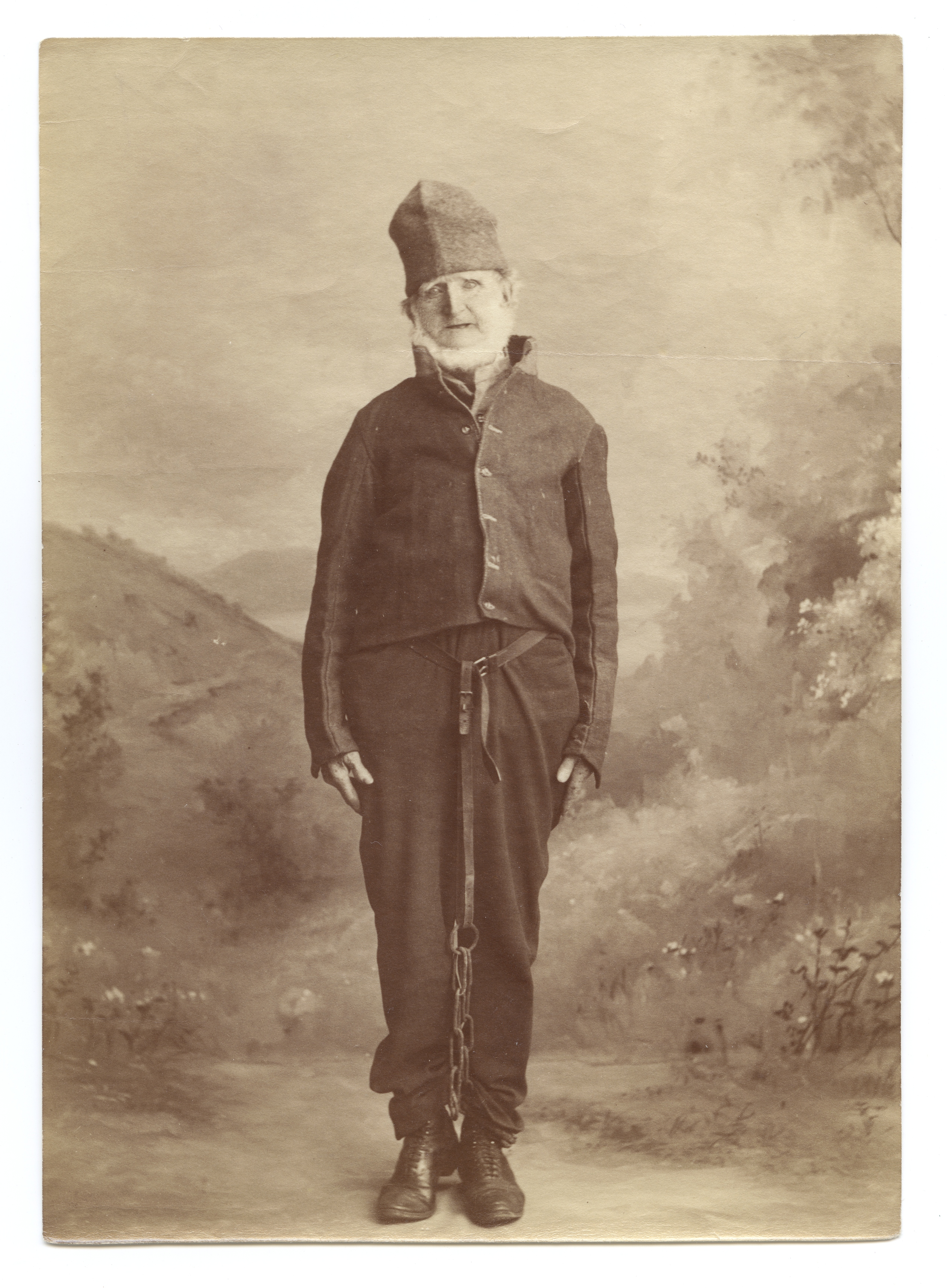
John Watt Beattie (n.d.) Bill Thompson (Tasmanian convict)

Apart from his landscape photography, and especially in his early years as a professional. studio portraiture provided much of Beattie's income and he kept apprised of current technical developments; in 1873 he wrote to the Photographic News on the potential advantage of gelatin dry plate emulsion advertised by London photographer John Burgess. His appointment as "Photographer to the Government of Tasmania" from 1896 ensured that many of his subjects were persons of note in Tasmanian history; mainly politicians, also judges, ministers of religion, explorers; James Whyte, James Agnew, James Milne Wilson, William James McWilliams, Henry Ling Roth, Alexander Clerke, William Henty, Thomas Gore Browne, Joseph Lyons, Thomas Chapman, William Crowther, Thomas Horne, John George Davies, Philip Oakley Fysh, Andrew Inglis Clark, Ronald Campbell Gunn, Frederick Innes, Charles Meredith, Charles Shum Henty, John Henry Lefroy, John Foster, Hugh Munro Hull, Alfred Kennerley, and the convict Bill Thompson whom he photographed in chains.

=== Historian ===
A history enthusiast, Beattie documented the crumbling ruins of the Port Arthur penal colony. In the 1890s Beattie set up a museum of art and artefacts in Elizabeth Street Hobart, relocated in 1921 to his photographic studio in Murray Street, which attracted visitors paying "a shilling a time". Appointed Photographer to the Government of Tasmania on 21 December 1896 he prepared composite pictures of the Governors of Tasmania 1804–1895, as well as Parliamentarians of Tasmania 1856–1895. In his government role he promoted tourism, Tasmania’s wealth of minerals and unique flora and fauna, and produced and distributed lantern slide shows on various subjects; A trip through Tasmania, From Kelly's Basin to Gormanston, as well as Port Arthur and Tasman Peninsula. The photographs appeared in the 1900 Cyclopedia of Tasmania, and posthumously in Walkabout, and his images of places such as Port Arthur and the Isle of the Dead were used as postcards into the early twentieth century. He presented at Andrew Inglis Clark’s the Minerva Club, and with Bishop Henry Montgomery and Professor William Brown founded an Historical Section, with Beattie as its vice-president, of the Royal Society of Tasmania in 1899. The Society made Beattie a fellow in 1890, and for it he conducted a series of lectures during the Tasmanian centenary celebrations of 1904 (later published as Glimpses of the Lives and Times of the Early Tasmanian Governors). His suggestion that a "series of pictorial stamps featuring scenic Tasmanian landscapes should be issued to promote the State", was taken up and eight Tasmanian pictorial stamps were printed in 1899, with five featuring photographs by Beattie, the remainder being reproductions of paintings by Haughton Forrest; they were issued until 1912.

=== Outside Australia ===
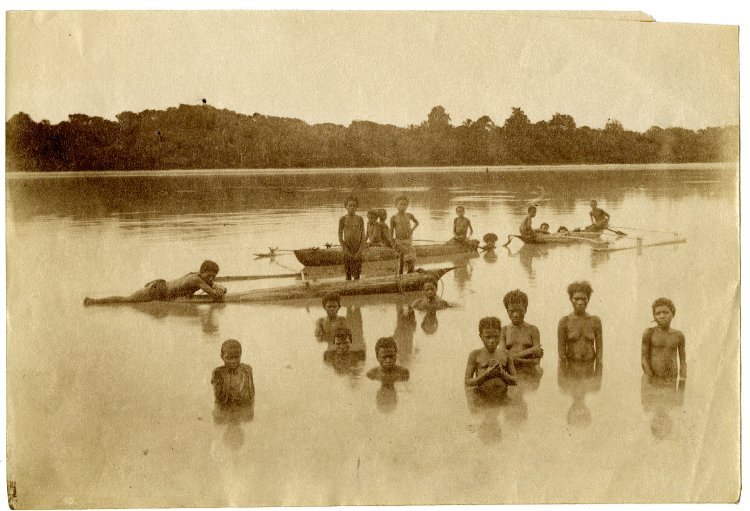
John Watt Beattie (1906) Fiji

Like other Australian photographers J. W. Lindt in 1885 and Charles Kerry in 1913, and New Zealanders Burton Bros. (1880s) and Josiah Martin (1898-1901), Beattie undertook photographic documentation in expeditions in the Western Pacific.

In late 1906 he made 1500 photographs on his trip in the Southern Cross, made at the invitation of Dr. Cecil Wilson, Bishop of Melanesia, to mission centres in Norfolk Island, the Solomons, the New Hebrides and Santa Cruz Islands.

Describing his time in Ambae he writes in his diary held in the Royal Society of Tasmania about gaining the confidence of subjects frightened by his camera by first showing them the view of boats on the sea on its ground glass, to the people’s delight.

In 1912 he developed the plates Roald Amundsen made on the first trek to the South Pole. However, a fire destroyed Beattie's studio and the Amundsen negatives were lost; the only surviving original is a print held in the National Library of Australia taken at the South Pole on 14 December 1911 by Olav Bjaaland, the day that Amundsen and his men reached the Pole, and depicts a group of the Norwegians, their tent and the Norwegian flag.

=== Death ===
On his sudden death of heart disease in Hobart on 24 June 1930, he had been the last surviving Charter member of the Hobart Lodge of the Theosophical Society. He was survived by his wife and by their two daughters. He was directly related to significant Australian photographers; cousin Jack Cato and nephew John Cato. His estate was valued for probate at £871.

== Publications ==
- Beattie, John W.; Nixon, Francis Russell. Aborigines of Tasmania. Tasmania. OCLC 758406944.
- Beattie, John Watt (1900). Port Arthur, past and present. OCLC 429667988.
- Beattie, John W. (1890). Beauty spots of Tasmania : mountain stream and glen (12 unnumbered leaves of plates, concertina folded ed.). Hobart: J.W. Beattie. OCLC 225097390.
- Beattie, John W. (1896). Governors of Tasmania, from 1804 to 1896. Hobart: J.W. Beattie. OCLC 221548682.
- Beattie, John W. (1905). Port Arthur and Tasman Peninsula, illustrating the convict days of Tasmania: A descriptive lecture to accompany slides. Hobart: Mercury Office. OCLC 219904642.
- Beattie, John W. (1911). Tasmania's West coast. Hobart: J.W. Beattie. OCLC 220915458.
- Beattie, John W. (1912). Historical photographs relating to Tasmania. Hobart: J.W. Beattie. OCLC 222662410.
- Beattie, John W. (1916). Souvenir of the 40th Battalion. Hobart: J.W. Beattie. OCLC 219810017.
- Beattie, John W.; Burn, David (1930). Port Arthur, the British settlement in Tasmania : glimpses of its stirring history. Hobart: Oldham, Beddome & Meredith. OCLC 925521185.

== Collections ==
The Launceston Corporation acquired a portion of his archive for £4500 and it is held in the Queen Victoria Museum; and slides were given to the Tasmanian Museum, Hobart after his death. The business he established continued selling his work until 1978.

== Legacy ==
In September 1937 the Royal Society of Tasmania in Hobart appealed for subscriptions to memorialise to Beattie in the Tasmanian Museum and Art Gallery and in 1938 the £15/12/6d (a 2021 value of A$1,370.40) raised purchased a collection of "modem books on Australian history, geography and anthropology". A then current desire amongst Tasmanians to erase the "convict stain" meant that convict-related artefacts in the collections, especially those from Port Arthur that Beattie amassed, were removed or not shown.

Beattie's work was notable in that it crystallised around a Romantic tradition that promoted a sympathetic orientation to the natural world. His pictures of sublime Tasmanian wilderness and Port Arthur in particular helped settlers and activists argue for the protection of nature, especially as a tourism asset, through the 1890s and into the twentieth century.

Beattie's cousin, the photographer and historian Jack Cato held him in high estimation as "the finest landscape photographer of his age".

== See also ==
- Photography in Australia

== Gallery of photographs by Beattie ==
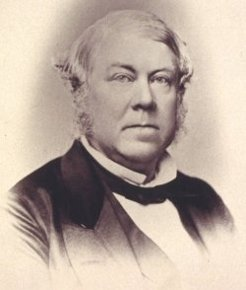
John Watt Beattie. Thomas Chapman, Premier of Tasmania

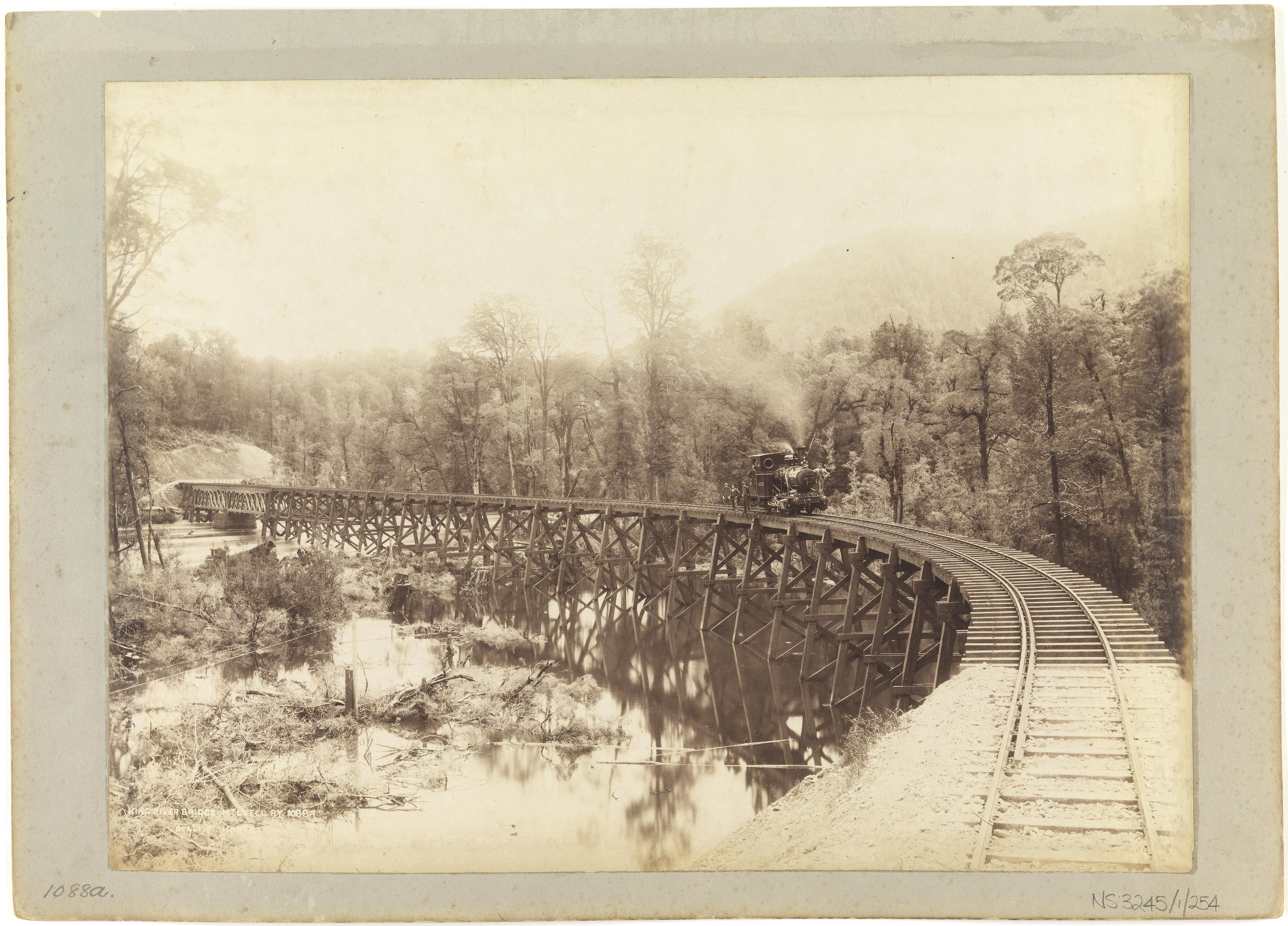
John Watt Beattie (c.1900) Mount Lyell railway showing train on King River Bridge

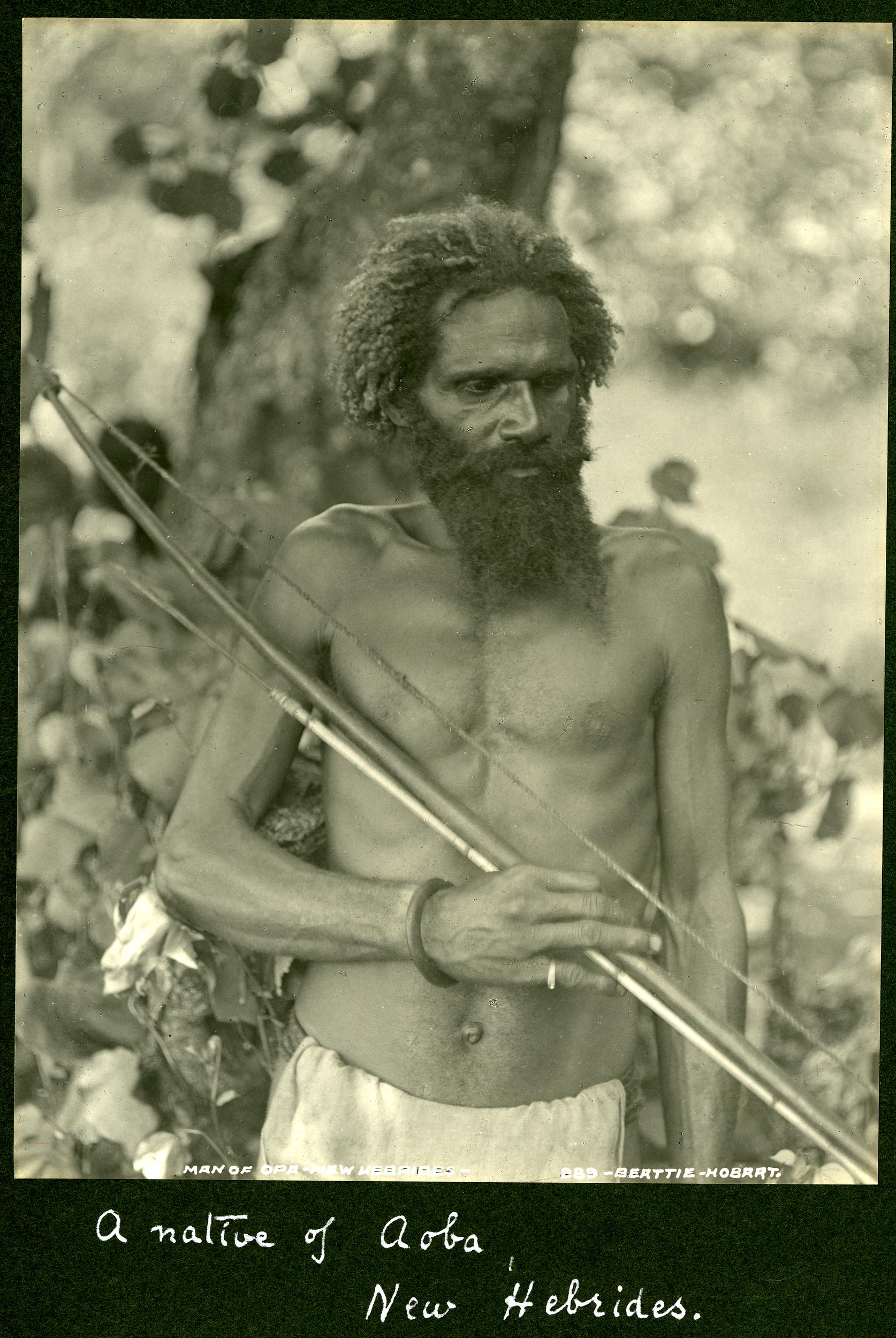
John Watt Beattie (1906) Man from Ambae

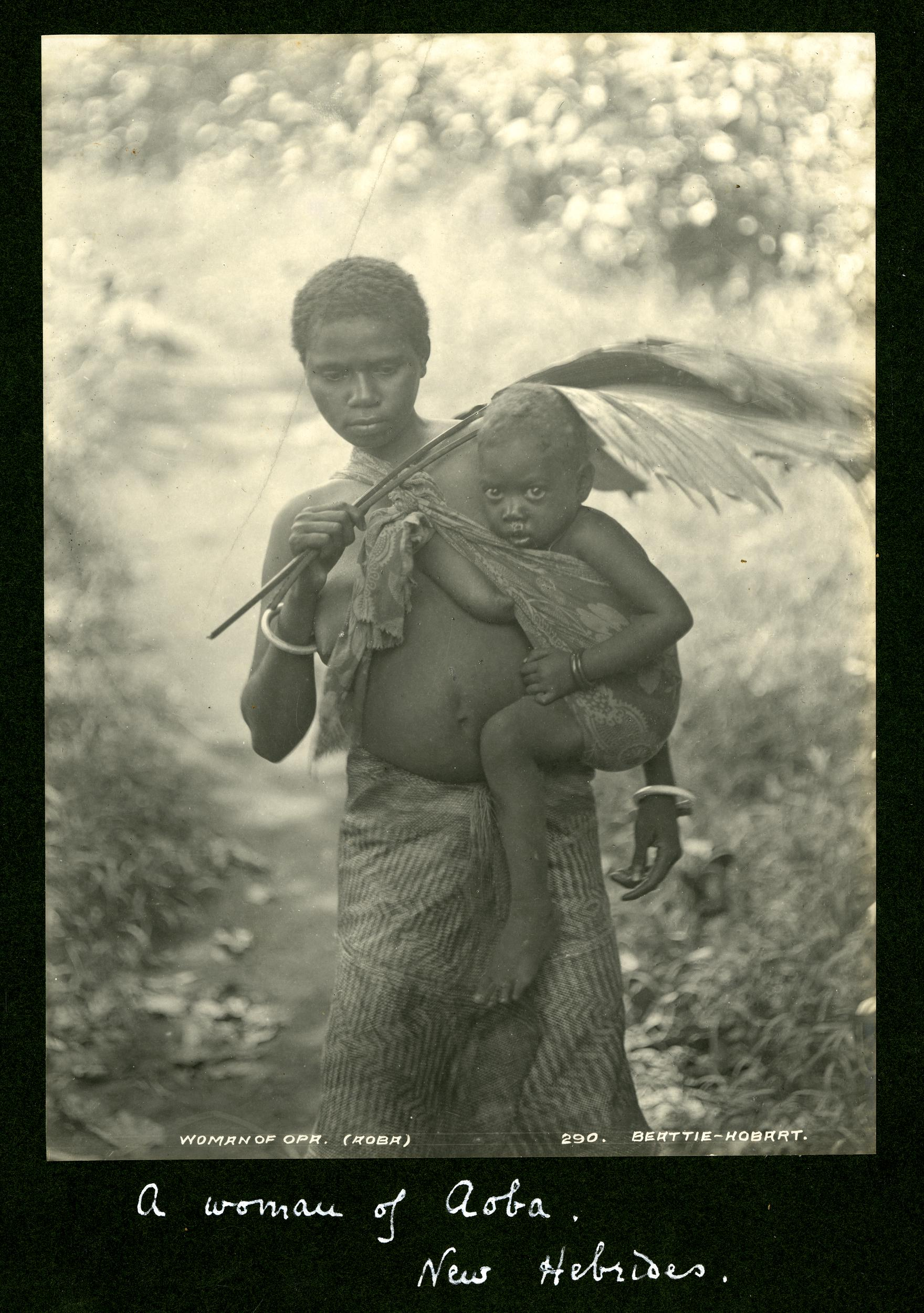
John Watt Beattie (1906) Woman from Ambae

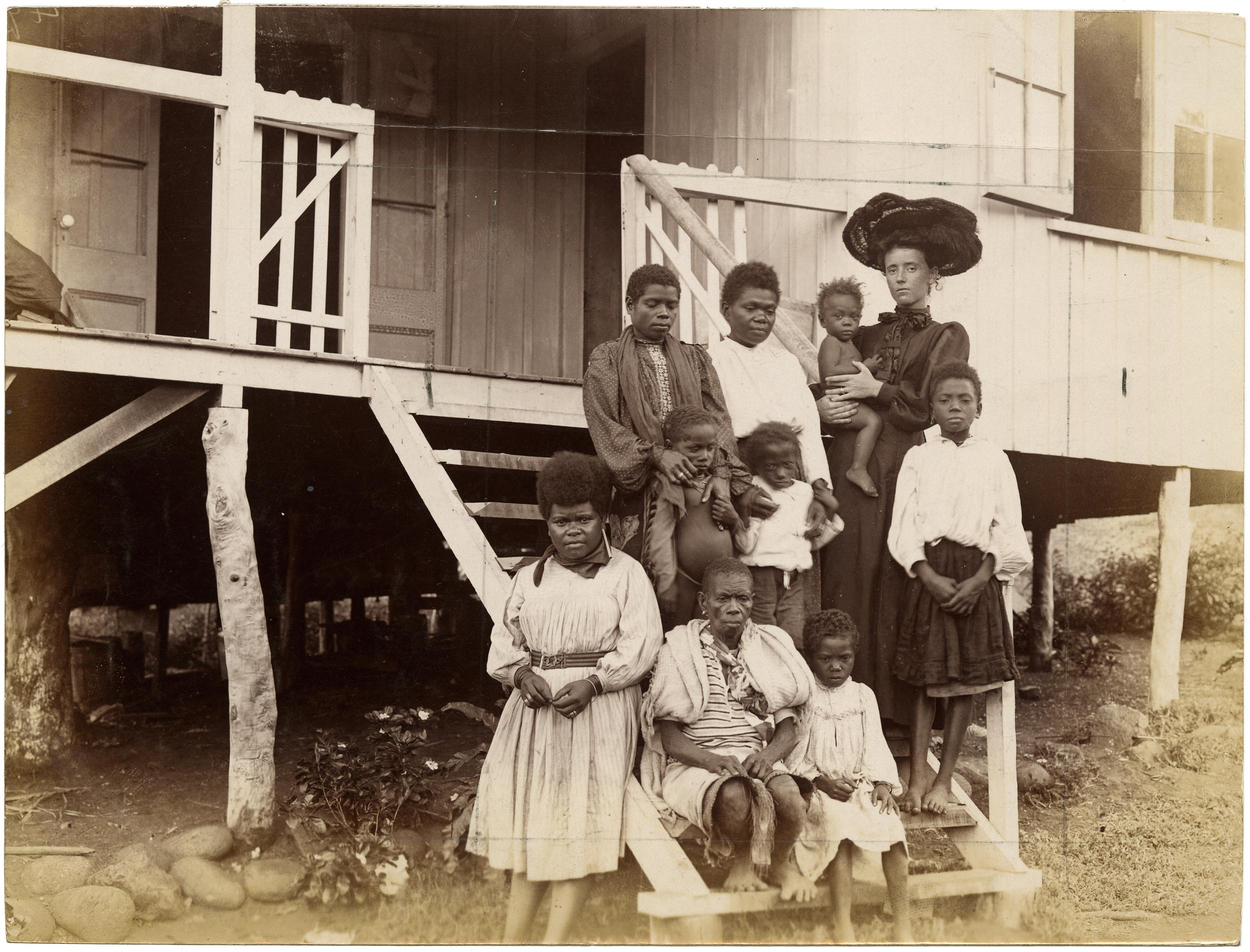
John Watt Beattie (1906) Women in front of a school in Lolowai

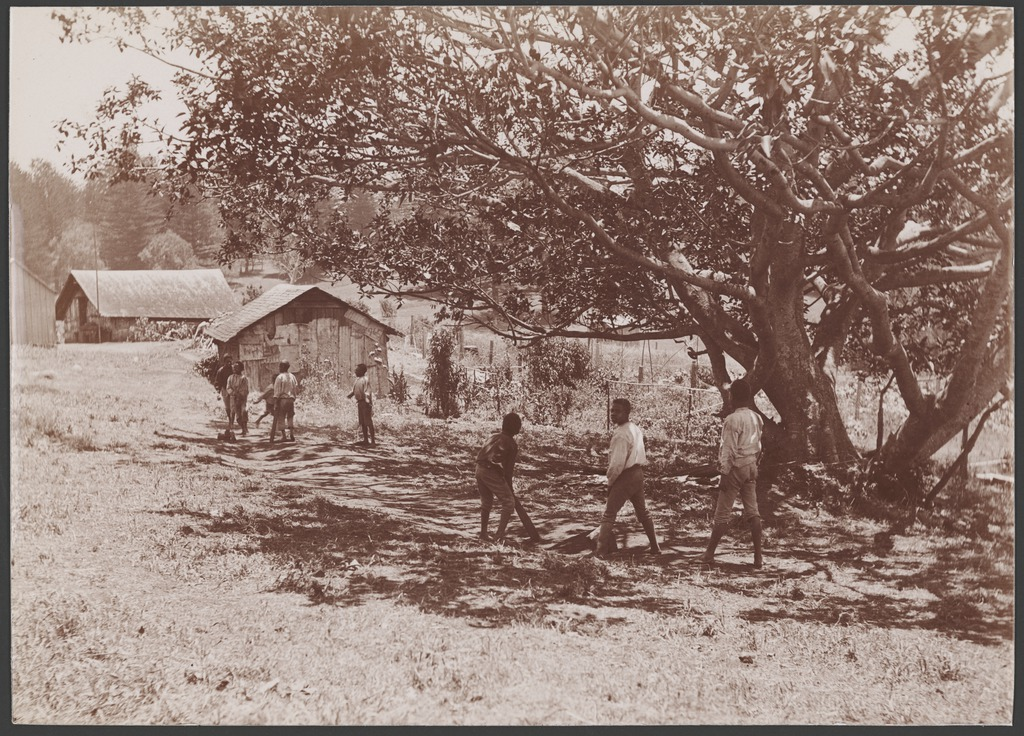
John Watt Beattie (1906) Children playing cricket at St. Barnabas, Norfolk Island

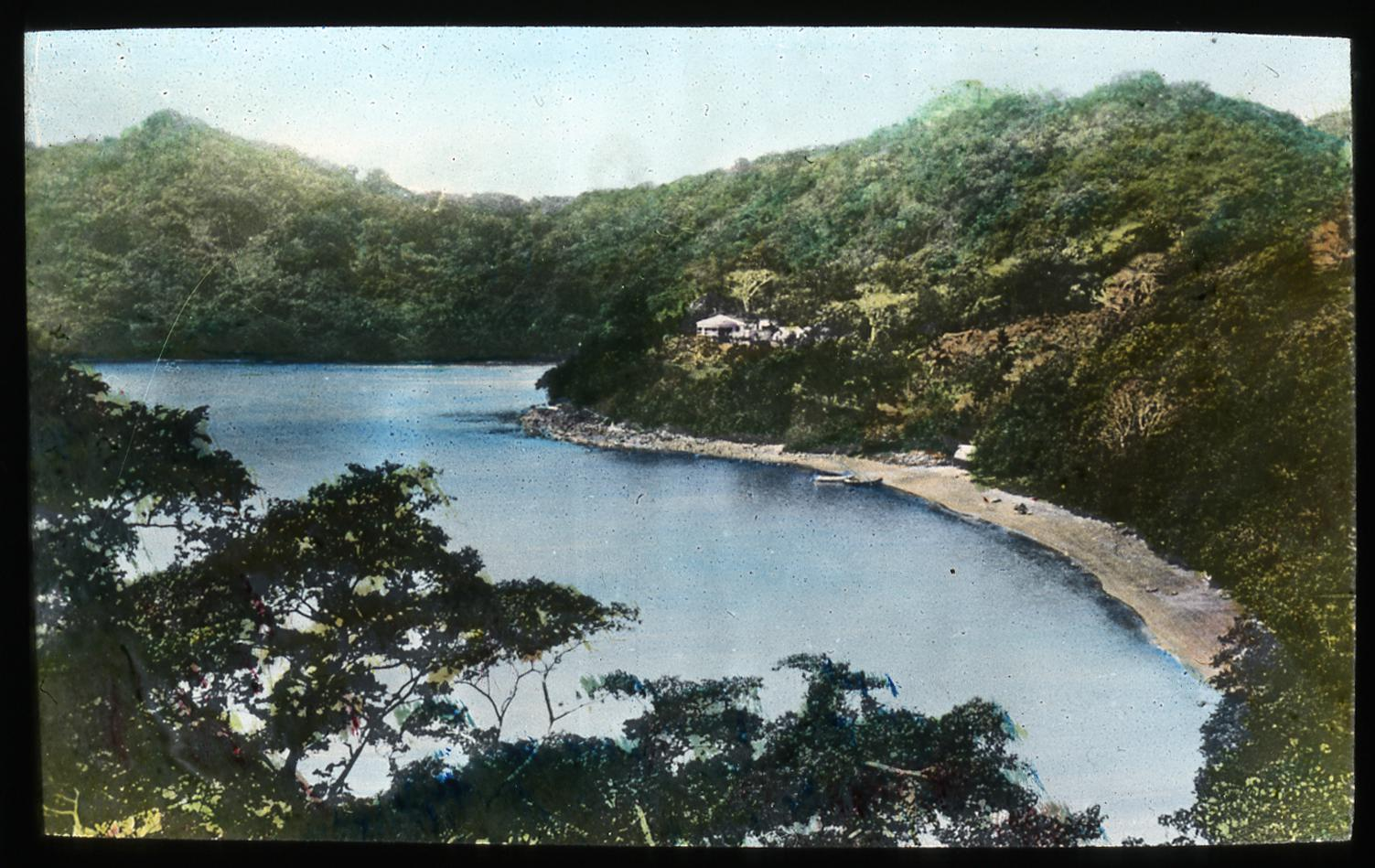
John Watt Beattie (1906) Lolowai Bay in Ambae, hand-coloured print

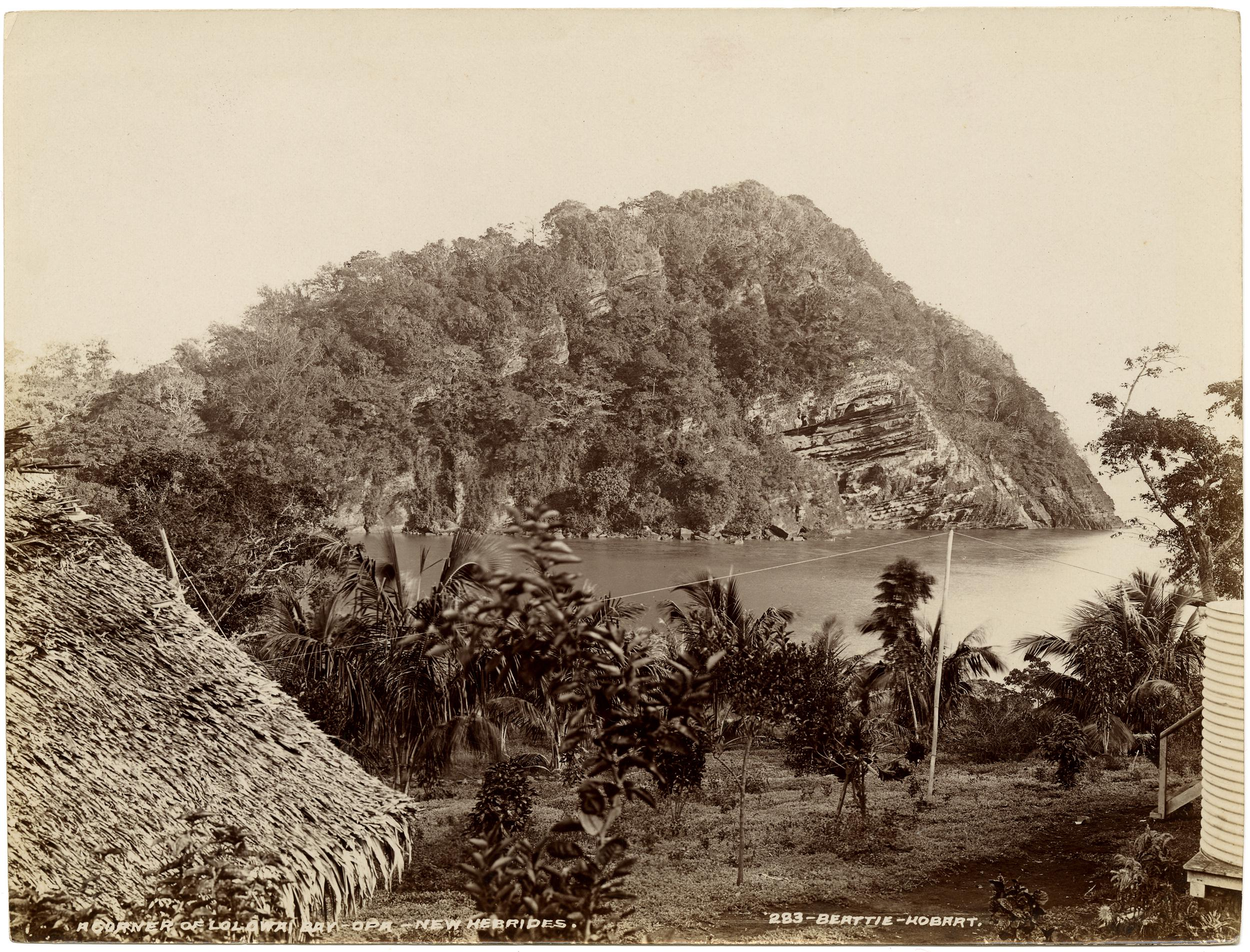
John Watt Beattie (1906) Lolowai Bay in Ambae

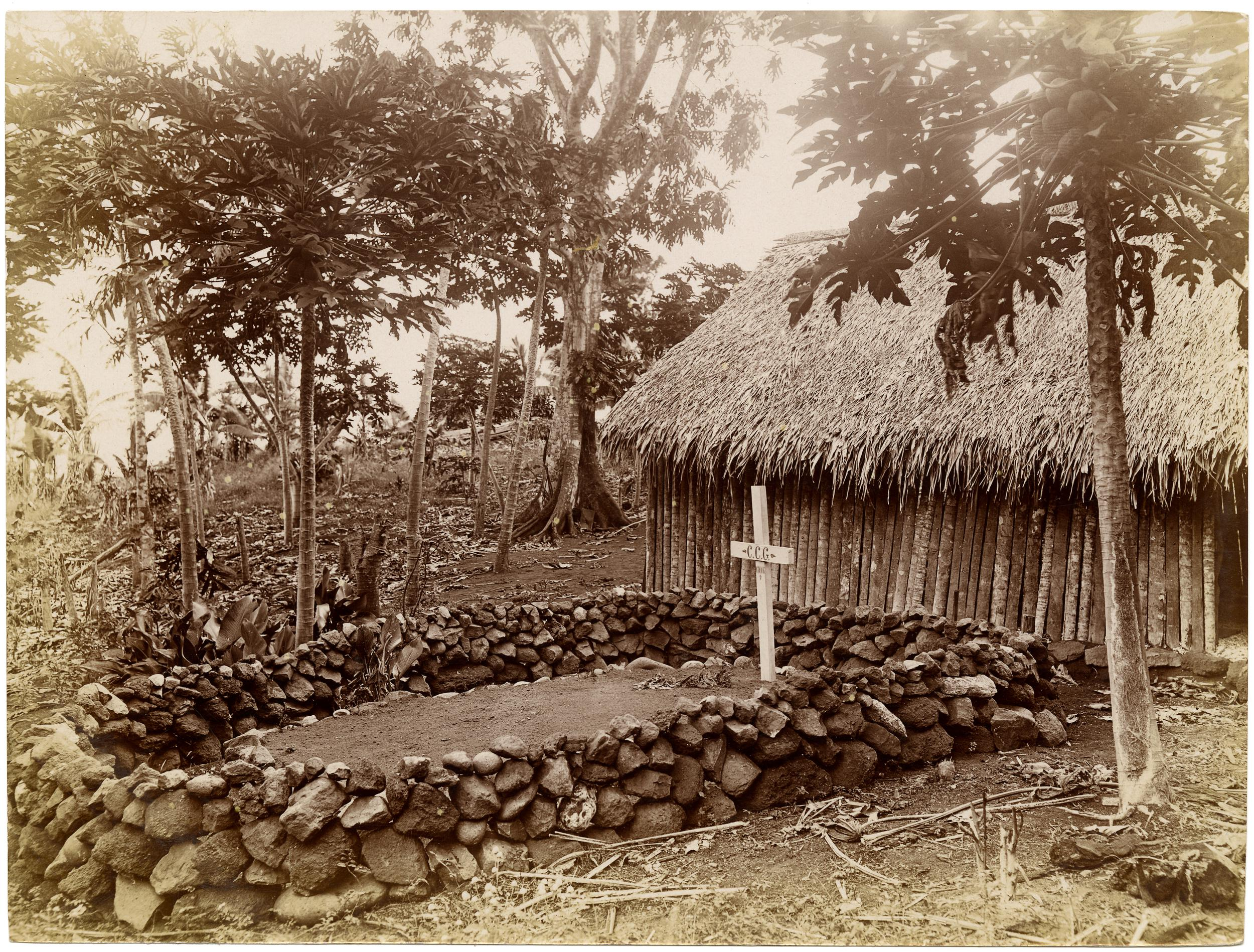
John Watt Beattie (1906) Grave of Reverend Charles Godden in Lolowai
