= Photography in Australia =

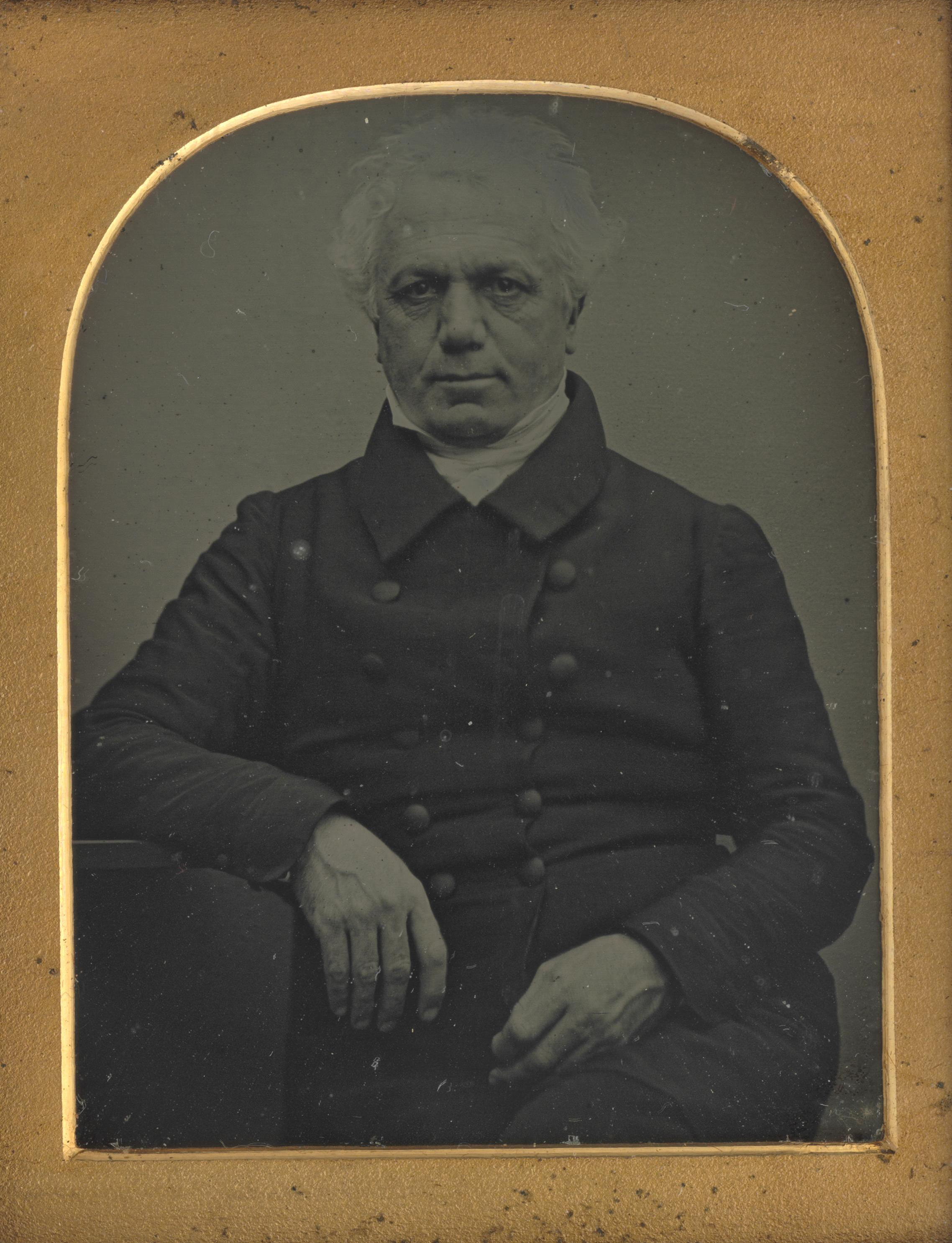
Photograph of Dr William Bland, taken by George Baron Goodman, 1845.

Photography in Australia started in the 1840s. The first photograph taken in Australia, a daguerreotype of Bridge Street, Sydney, was taken in 1841.

In the early 20th century, Australian photography was heavily influenced by the Pictorialist approach. In the mid-20th century, the photographic scene in Australia was shaped by modernist influences from abroad.

According to the 2011 Australian Census, 9,549 respondents indicated photographer as their main job.

Also see a list of Australian photographers in Wikipedia.

== 19th century photography ==
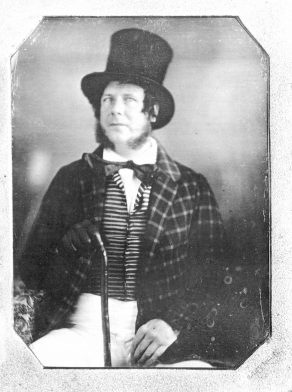
Daguerreotype of Sydney publican Edward Thomas McDonald (1810–1866) taken by J.W. Newland, 1848

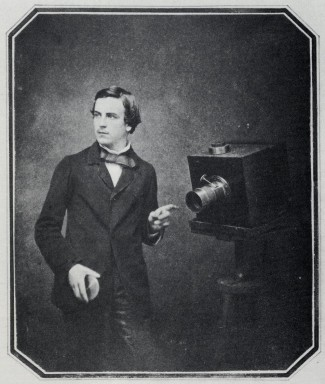
Walter B. Woodbury, c1855

The first photograph taken in Australia, a daguerreotype of Bridge Street, Sydney, was recorded as having been taken by a visiting naval captain, Captain Augustin Lucas (1804–1854) in 1841. The existence of the photograph was indicated in a note published in The Australasian Chronicle on 13 April of that year. Lucas had arrived aboard the Justine, captained by his younger brother Francois Lucas. Lucas, late commander of the Naval School expedition, intended to sell his camera and equipment which he put on display in the office of Messrs. Joubert and Murphey, in Macquarie Place.

Commercial photography began on 12 December 1842 when photographic portraits, at a cost of one guinea each, were made, using the daguerreotype process, on the roof of The Royal Hotel, Sydney. The photographer concerned was George Baron Goodman (1815–1891) the first professional photographer in Australia. Goodman, who had arrived in 1842, took several thousand daguerreotypes in over four and a half years in the colonies. He sold his photographic business to his brother-in-law, Isaac Polack, in 1847, and left Australia in 1850.

The earliest known surviving photograph taken in Australia is believed to be a daguerreotype portrait of Dr William Bland by Goodman. This portrait is likely to be the one mentioned in The Sydney Morning Herald of 14 January 1845.

Important early professional photographers include Edwin Dalton, William Glover Webb Freeman (1809–1855), Thomas Foster Chuck (1826–1898), Walter Woodbury (1834–1885), Nicholas Caire (1837–1918) and John Lindt (1845–1926).

Thorton Richards Camera House in Ballarat, which opened in 1872, claims to be the oldest camera store in Australia.

RMIT University in Melbourne first taught photography in 1887 as an inaugural discipline, and has done so continuously, making it the oldest ongoing photography course in the world.

== 20th century photography ==
In the early 20th century, Frank Hurley, was a noted photographer whose subject matter included Antarctic explorations, led by Douglas Mawson and Ernest Shackleton, and the battlefields of the First World War. Other influential photographers were Harold Cazneaux, and Cecil Bostock, both founding members of the Sydney Camera Circle, in 1916. Like Hurley, this group was heavily influenced by the Pictorialist approach to photography. Their Pictorialist approach was adapted to the Australian environment and its strong sunlight; this group of photographers pledged "to work and to advance pictorial photography and to show our own Australia in terms of sunlight rather than those of greyness and dismal shadows", imparting a distinctive Australian perspective to their work. In Melbourne founder of the Victorian Photographic Salon in 1929 and Pictorialist Dr Julian Smith's melodramatic and heavily printed portraits and theatrical 'character studies' brought him international fame in salons.

Pictorialist photographer Robert Vere Scott, influenced by the visit to Australia of noted American aerial panoramic photographer Melvin Vaniman in 1903–1904, began taking pictures in a similar panoramic format, before leaving Australia in 1918. Rose Simmonds, working in Brisbane during the 1920s and 1930s, was also a leading Pictorialist photographer. Trained as an artist, she only took up photography after her marriage.

During the 1930s and 1940s, Max Dupain, created images of Australian life, most notably his 1937 photograph, Sunbaker. Dupain had learned his craft, while apprenticed to the Pictorialist Cecil Bostock, but abandoned the soft-focus pictorial style for a sharp-focus modernist approach. His companion and assistant Olive Cotton became a leading photographer in her own right.

In the mid-20th century, the photographic scene in Australia was shaped by modernist influences from abroad. This period saw an influx of people from Europe, including Wolfgang Sievers, Helmut Newton and Henry Talbot. They settled in Melbourne, bringing with them a modern aesthetic and new skills from their training at influential schools such as Berlin's Reimann School and Contemporary School of Applied Arts. A vibrant and creative culture emerged with many photographers establishing commercial studios around the thriving arts precinct in Collins Street in buildings such as the Grosvenor Chambers.

After the war, Wolfgang Sievers and Helmut Newton set up studios in Collins Street and Flinders Lane respectively. Other influential photographers such as Athol Shmith, Dr Julian Smith and Norman Ikin set up studios nearby.

== 21st century photography ==
The contemporary photography industry in Australia is highly competitive. In the 2011 Australian Census, 9,549 respondents indicated photographer as their main job.
