= Strizic =

Strizic or Strižić is a surname. Notable people with the surname include:

- Mark Strizic, German-born Australian photographer
- Zdenko Strižić (1902–1990), Croatian architect
