= Christine Abrahams Gallery =

Australian Art Gallery

Coordinates: 37.823541°S 144.996092°E

Christine Abrahams Gallery, first named Axiom, was a Melbourne gallery showing contemporary Australian art between 1980 and 2008.

== Foundation ==
Christine Abrahams (5 March 1939 – 15 September 1994) graduated with a Bachelor of Arts from Melbourne University in 1961 majoring in Fine Art. She was a guide at the National Gallery of Victoria for several years, then assisted Patrick McCaughey with research at Monash University, and was a gallery director and major supporter of contemporary Australian art in Melbourne from the 1970s, after her marriage to husband Daryl (born 1935), with whom she had three sons Guy, Damian and Ari.

Artist Lenton Parr said of Christine that she valued art "as a gift to the spirit and a source of pleasure and enlightenment," while then director of the National Gallery of Australia, Betty Churcher valued her generosity and enthusiasm, saying she "provided Melbourne with a space and an intellectual climate for some of the most interesting contemporary art from both Australia and overseas."

Abrahams was Manager of Powell Street Gallery between 1976 and 1980 (the lessees were Melbourne solicitor Harry Curtis and Caulfield doctor and art collector, David Rosenthal).

== Axiom ==
Until 1982, Abrahams was co-director of Axiom Gallery, established in March 1980 at the address of the future Christine Abrahams Gallery, 27 Gipps Street, Richmond, an inner, once-industrial, suburb of Melbourne. In the same precinct an increasing number of other commercial galleries, including the long-running Pinacotheca, Niagara Galleries, Stuart Gerstman, and Church Street Centre for Photography appeared.

Of Axiom, critic and artist Robert Rooney remarked:

"Since opening in 1980, Axiom Gallery, Richmond, has continued to support the cause of modernist abstraction, the house style it inherited—along with artists such as Syd Ball, Fred Cress, Vic Mazjner—and Englishman John Walker, from the old Powell Street Gallery which was run by Axiom's three directors in the late 1970s."

Axiom's opening show consisted of large abstract paintings by Sydney Ball, Fred Cress, John Walker and John Firth-Smith, selling at between $700 and $9500, and was followed by a solo of works by photographer David Moore. By 1982, when the gallery was renamed, Abrahams in an interview proudly detailed its record in supporting women artists:

"Eight out of 16 artists we've shown this year have been women. We don't choose them because they're women but because the work is really exciting."

=== Axiom exhibitions; ===
- 1980, July: Barbara Zerbini
- 1980, July/Aug: Victor Majzner
- 1980, September: Helen Geier
- 1980, December: Group exhibition: Lesley Dumbrell, Roger Kemp, Sandra Leveson, Victor Majzner, Fred Williams and photographs by David Moore and Max Dupain
- 1981, February, 7-20: Polly Courtin (painting), Tim Bass (drawing), Nanette Carter (photographs), Tom Psomatragos (photographs)
- 1981, 7–19 March: William Kelly drawings
- 1981, April: Gisèle Freund photographs
- 1981, May: Kevin Connor
- 1981, June: Roy Churcher
- 1981, June: Michaela Brysha Hair Curler Series
- 1981, July: Hector Gilliland drawings, Harold Cazneaux photographs
- 1981, July-18 August: John Walker
- 1981, August: The Figure in Drawing and Painting: John Brack, William Frater, Gil Jamieson, Jon Molvig, Merv Moriarty, Peter Powditch, Tony Underhill. Works on Paper, Jeremy Barrett
- 1981, September: Three American Painters: Alan Cote, Ray Parker, Harvey Quaytman
- 1981, September-22 October: Fred Cress
- 1981, November: Lenton Parr
- 1981, to 12 November: Pamela Wragg
- 1981, to 11 December: Adrian Kerfoot
- 1982, 13 February – 3 March: Simon Blau, Peter Brooks, David Hawkes, Peter Jones, Barbara Neil, Susan Norrie, with Julie Patey charcoal drawings.
- 1982, to 25 March: Robert Owen
- 1982, to 22 April: Victor Majzner
- 1982, to 25 June: Enzo Cucchi, Mimmo Paladino, Francesco Clemente, Nicola de Maria, Sandro Chia
- 1982, 26 June – 15 July: Marion Borgelt paintings, Tony Woods, drawings
- 1982, to 9 December: Lesley Dumbrell paintings and watercolours, Sue Ford Photo Book Of Women: 1961- 1982, traveling show from the Art Gallery of New South Wales
- 1982, to end December: ceramic sculptures by James Draper, and One Year Hence, jewellery by former students of RMIT and their lecturer, Robert Baines

In summing up the year 1980, critic Brigid Cole-Adams described Axiom as a "good more conventional gallery with interesting contemporary work including both abstract and new realist styles."

== Renamed Christine Abrahams Gallery ==
In December 1982 Axiom gallery closed, and with Abrahams as director, was eponymously renamed the Christine Abrahams Gallery, reopening on 12 February 1983. It showed a broad spectrum of visual arts by contemporary artists, including photography, by architects, and craftspeople and indigenous artists, including jewellers, ceramicists and furniture makers. Stuart Gerstman Gallery opened next door at number 29 in April 1983. In 1987 Christine's son Guy Abrahams joined her as co-director of the gallery.

The building had been converted in 1980 from a clothing factory by the architect of Abrahams' own 1982 Brighton residence, Daryl Jackson, who designed Abrahams' own house in Beaumaris, preserved the industrial aesthetic of exposed trusses, bare concrete floors and steel roller-door. Jackson himself exhibited at the gallery in April 1984, showing drawings and models for a "more humane" neo-industrial style. Critic Robert Rooney described the renovation as "spacious and well-planned, and an ideal setting for...large paintings." The configuration of the gallery, with a smaller space to the left of the main gallery, allowed for shows of smaller works on paper (usually drawings, photographs, or prints) simultaneously with shows usually of larger paintings or sculpture. The gallery was recommended in 1994 as a favourite by Susan Fereday, then director of the Centre for Contemporary Photography, and Merryn Gates, director of the Ian Potter Museum of Art, University of Melbourne.

=== Exhibitions under the name 'Christine Abrahams Gallery' ===
- 1983, February: Eight artists, including Ann Weir and Daniel Kogan
- 1983, to 24 March: Fiona Orr, sculpture (main gallery) and Wendy Stavrianos prints (side gallery)
- 1983, to 15 April: Genny Haasz, drawings and monoprints.
- 1983, 20 April to 12 May: Stephen Spurrier paintings, and Sandringham Series by Craig Gough
- 1983, to 2 June: Ann Thomson, collages and painting
- 1983, to 6 July: Fred Cress, paintings and Marcus Shanahan, sculpture
- 1983, to 4 August: Sydney Ball paintings and drawings
- 1983, to 15 October: Loretta Quinn sculpture, Adrian Kerfoot painting
- 1983, to 26 October: Judy Silver, Paperworks and Constructions
- 1983, to 17 November: Elizabeth Gower paintings, and John Firth-Smith lithographs
- 1983, 22 November to 8 December: Clive Murray-White, John Ballany and Terry Setch
- 1983, to 24 December: Furniture by Dael Evans, Jane Joyce, Roger Wood and Randall Marsh
- 1984, to 12 April: Daryl Jackson, architectural drawings and John Gollings photographs of Jackson's architecture
- 1984, to 31 May: Akio Makigawa sculpture and Carlier Makigawa small jewellery/sculpture works
- 1984, 5 June to 25 June: Marion Borgelt paintings, Tom Fantl The Prague Suite
- 1984, from 14 July: Le Corbusier, etchings
- 1984, to 30 August: Victor Majzner, Daniel Kogan
- 1984, 5 September to 5 October: Bulun Bulun, bark paintings
- 1984, to 1 November: Lesley Dumbrell, paintings
- 1984, to 22 November: New Sculptors, New Sculpture, Loretta Quinn, Bruce Armstrong, Peter D. Cole, Ray Woolard, Lyn Plummer, Fiona Orr, Lenton Parr, Clive Murray-White, Hilary Mais
- 1984, to 20 December: Self-serve. Supermarket Style Fashion Fashion Design Council of Australia exhibition/sale of fashion
- 1984, to 27 December: Works on Paper group show
- 1985, February: Grant Mudford, photography
- 1985, March: prints by Barbie Kjar, paintings by Denise Green
- 1985, May: Helen Geier, paintings
- 1988, 26 September – 13 October: Mark Strizic, Melbourne 1954 – 1964
- 1989, May: Wild Beast, Michael Kemp; paintings by Helena Kazepis
- 1988, to 3 November: Maria Kuczynska, sculpture
- 1994 24 February: Italian Journey by Alexandra Copeland; David McLeod, paintings
- 1994 to 24 March: Sculpture by Antonio Colangelo, and Maria Kuczynska
- 1994, to 21 April: Fred Cress
- 1994, 25 April–19 May: Paintings and etchings by Voula Therios; Recent work by Stephen Birch
- 1994, to 16 June: Grass fibre weavings from Ramingining and Back to the Future, photographs by Jeff Carter
- 1994, to 14 July: paintings by Mandy Martin; Scenes of the Passion, photographs by Maria Grande
- 1994, 16 July–11 August: prints by Barbie Kjar, paintings by Denise Green
- 1994, 15 August – 8 September: Paintings and works on paper by Aida Tomescu
- 1994, 15 September–6 October: Michael Johnson
- 1994, October: Travelling East: photographs of Asia by Richard l'anson
- 1994, November: Fiona Murphy, ceramics
- 1994, 5–23 December: Second Hand, works by Miyuki Nakahara; Wall mounted works in glass by Warren Langley
- 1995, 14–31 August: Melbourne in the '60s – an exhibition of photographs by Mark Strizic
- 1997, to 20 March: Marion Borgelt
- 2000, to October 12: Mandy Martin, Salvator Rosa Series III

== Closure ==
After Christine's premature death at age 55 from cancer on 15 September 1994, the gallery was operated by her son Guy Abrahams, who had been co-director since 1987.

The gallery was closed after 28 years in November 2008. The Gallery archive was donated to the State Library of Victoria.

== Influence ==
Christine initiated the influential Australian Contemporary Art Fair (now Melbourne Art Fair) and was a member of its organising committee in 1988, 1990 and 1992. She was on the board of the Fifth Australian Sculpture Triennial (1993) and was a member of the Visual Art Export Group of the Australia Council and the Craft Council of Victoria.
