= Kjar =

Kjar is a surname. Notable people with the surname include:

- Barbie Kjar (born 1957), Australian artist and educator
- Kimball Kjar (born 1978), American rugby player
