= Gold Coast Art Prize =

The Gold Coast Art Prize is an annual acquisitive exhibition run by the Gold Coast City Art Gallery in the city of the Gold Coast, Queensland, Australia. One of Australia's oldest art prizes, it began in 1968 as the Gold Coast Art Prize but was known as the Conrad Jupiters Art Prize from 1990 to 2006 and as the Stan and Maureen Duke Gold Coast Prize from 2007 to 2011. It has since reverted to its original name.

== Prizewinners ==
=== Gold Coast Art Prize ===
- 2014 Sonia Leber and David Chesworth for We are Printers too (video)
- 2013 Darren Wardle for Head Case Study 7
- 2012 Chris Bennie for The Western Fields (video)

=== Stan and Maureen Duke Gold Coast Art Prize ===
- 2011 Chris Langlois for Darkwood no. 19 2011
- 2010 Joe Furlonger for Bridge to Bribie
- 2009 Christopher Jones for the liver is the bucket kicked the rabbit
- 2008 Bruce Reynolds
- 2007 James Guppy

=== Conrad Jupiters Art Prize ===
- 2006 Susan Buret
- 2005 Bernard Ollis
- 2004 Marie Hagerty
- 2003 Juan Ford
- 2002
- 2001 Stephen Hart
- 2000 Megan Walch
- 1999 Barbie Kjar, Dean Bowen (sculpture)
- 1998
- 1997 Lorna Fencer Napurrula
- 1995
- 1994 Guan Wel for The Great War of the Eggplants No 2

=== Gold Coast Art Prize ===
- 1977 Basil Hadley
- 1976
- 1975 Robert Dickerson
- 1972
- 1971 Jeff Makin
- 1970 Andrew Sibley
- 1969 Jon Molvig for Tree of Man X
- 1968 Michael Taylor for Overnight Sleeper
- John Coburn
- Lawrence Daws
