= Megan Walch =

- Born: 1967 (age 58–59); Tasmania, Australia
- Education: San Francisco Art Institute; University of Tasmania
- Known for: Painting

Megan Walch (born Tasmania 1967) is a contemporary Australian painter.

== Biography ==
Walch graduated from the University of Tasmania with a Bachelor of Fine Arts with Honors, 1989 and was the recipient of an Anne and Gordon Samstag Scholarship in 1994. She completed a Master of Fine Arts at the San Francisco Art Institute, California, 1997, attending the Skowhegan School of Painting and Sculpture in Maine in the summer of 1996. In 1998 she received a grant of a studio for twelve months in The Marie Walsh Sharpe Art Foundation's Space Program in Manhattan.

Her work has been exhibited in the United States and Australia. Exhibitions include:

- Primavera 2000 curated by Melissa Chiu at the Museum of Contemporary Art in Sydney
- Kindle and Swag - The Samstag Effect curated by Ross Wolfe at the University of South Australia, 2004
- Artists to Artists: A Decade of the Space Program at Ace Gallery New York, 2002
- Wilderness - Balnaves Contemporary Painting curated by Wayne Tunnicliffe at the Art Gallery of New South Wales, 2010
- The Skullbone Experiment: A Paradigm of Art and Nature curated by Catherine Wolfhagen at QVMAG and COFA, 2014.

Walch’s art work has been influenced by residencies in Australia Council for the Arts and Asialink overseas studios at the Taipei National University of the Arts in 2002, Khon Kaen University in North Eastern Thailand in 2004 and Tokyo, Japan in 2014. She has taught at the Australian National University's Canberra School of Art, Monash University, the Victorian College of the Arts, and the Tasmanian College of the Arts where she is a PhD candidate. Her work is represented by Bett Gallery in Hobart, Tasmania.

In 2000 she was awarded the Conrad Jupiters Art Prize of the Gold Coast City Art Gallery.
