= Joel Rea =

Australian artist

- Born: 27 January 1983 (age 43); Teesside, Middlesbrough, England
- Education: Griffith University
- Occupation: Artist
- Website: joelrea.com.au

Joel Rea (born 27 January 1983) is an Australian artist known for his surreal, photorealistic oil on canvas works.

Joel Rea has won multiple minor art awards. Rea's allegorical paintings combine elements from hyperrealism, photorealism and virtuosic Renaissance realism. He has exhibited his paintings in galleries and public spaces since 2004. Notable collectors of Rea's artworks include UFC commentator & comedian Joe Rogan, fashion editor & writer Tim Blanks, Author Chris Salgardo. Rea has been profiled by such art publications as Juxtapoz, VICE Arts, Beautiful Bizarre, WideWalls, Art Business News & Huffington Post Arts.

== Early life and education ==
Rea was born in Teesside, Middlesbrough, England, in 1983. He moved to Australia with his family at the age of two. He is a distant relative of Chris Rea.

Rea received his early education from Palm Beach Currumbin State High School. He graduated from the Queensland College of Art, Griffith University in 2003 with a bachelor's degree in fine arts.

== Career ==
In 2006, Rea's debut solo painting exhibition, "High Fidelity", was entirely purchased by an art collector prior to its public unveiling. The following year, his piece "Killing Me Softly" was sold for AU$30,000, marking a personal record for a single artwork sale.

Notably, his piece, "Moment of Truth", was shortlisted for the Metro Gallery Art Award, a major Australian award for artists under the age of 35. In 2013, American magazine Art Business News selected Joel Rea as one of 30 artists under the age of 30 who are revolutionizing the world of fine arts.

== Exhibitions ==
Rea's work has been exhibited in galleries and public spaces such as Jonathan Levine Gallery in New York City, HOFA Gallery in Los Angeles, Gold Coast City Art Gallery in Gold Coast, Australia.
