= Borgelt =

Borgelt is a surname. Notable people with the surname include:

- Marion Borgelt (born 1954), Australian artist
- Peter Borgelt (1927–1994), German actor
