= Jeremy Barrett =

Jeremy Barrett may refer to:

- Jeremy Barrett (artist) (born 1936), Australian artist
- Jeremy Barrett (figure skater) (born 1984), American pair skater
