= Ray Woolard =

Australian artist (1951–2023)

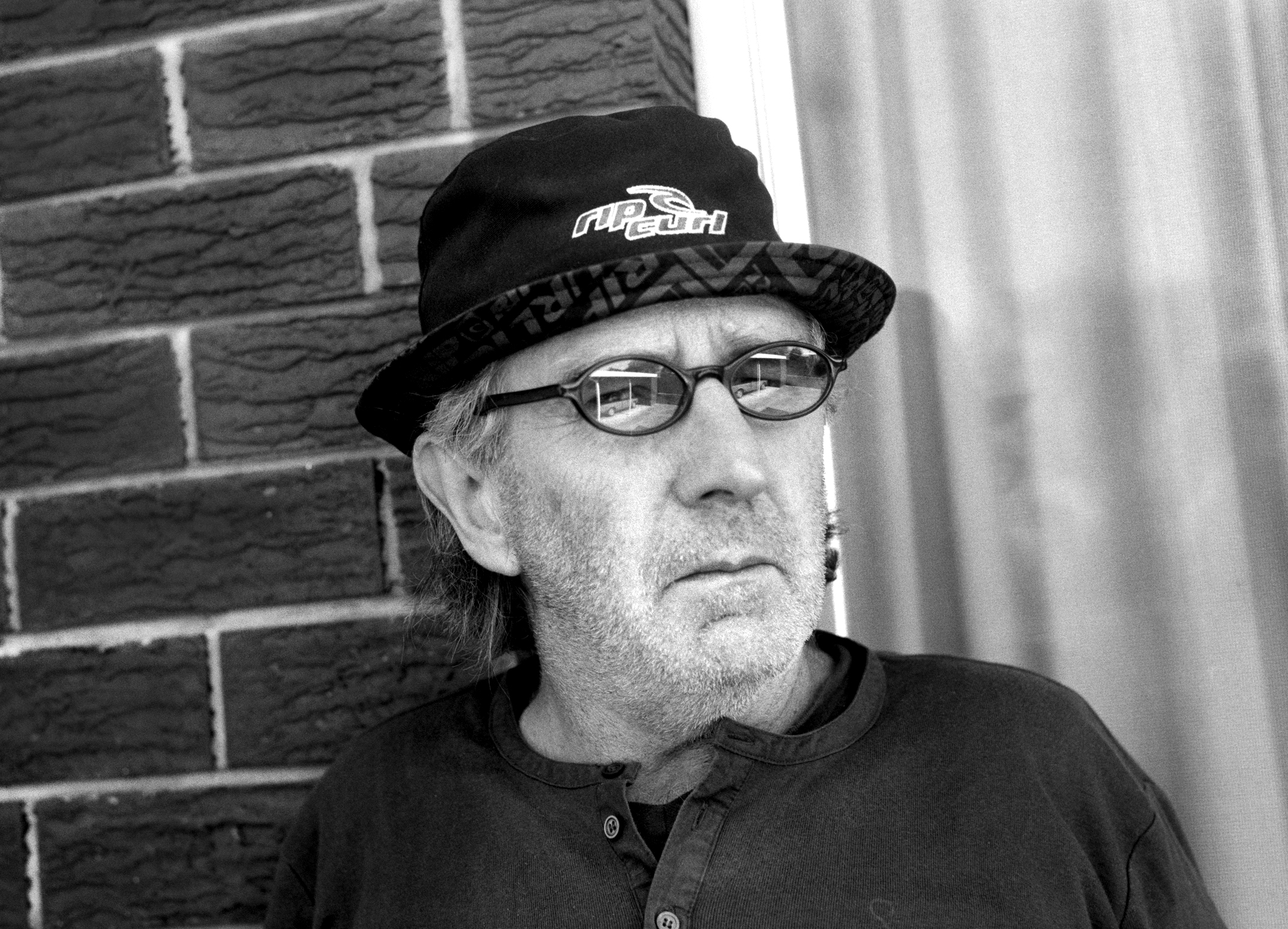

Raymond Eric (Ray) Woolard (1951–2023) was an Australian artist from Ballarat, well known and much celebrated in the 1970s and 80s for his sculpture in steel, multi media and found objects, installations and paintings.

Little has been written about Ray with the main source of information found in Ken Scarlett's "Australian Sculptors", 1980.

In his later years, Ray Woolard lived a reclusive life in Ballarat, though continuing to work.

Konrad Winkler photographed Ray Woolard in 2008 as part of a project to record some of the older artists still living in Ballarat. The resulting body of work is called "The Boys" or "The Trouble with Boys". The image was included in zine, "The Boys, 2005-2007'

On 30 June 2024, at Art Gallery Ballarat 20 or so artists of Ballarat and the region gathered to celebrate Ray Woolard's life and commitment to art. Many shared their stories about Ray, including his unrealised death. It was decided that a Wikipedia page should be started.

== Biography ==
- Born 10 January 1951, Ballarat
- 1966–1977: Travel, including 2 months in SE Asia, and New York. [needs checking]
- 1969–1973: Completed a Diploma of Art (Sculpture) at the Ballarat School of Mines (which became Ballarat Institute of Advanced Education), now known as Federation University, Ballarat.
- 1971/1972: Fellow student at School of Mines Ballarat at this time, Alec Cimera, recalls that Ray had "a prime position in the sculpture faculty - an isolated and private workspace within the larger room. Ray drew, and produced the most amazing History Journal in that room. The sculpture department was led by the liberal, broadminded and inspirational Helen Ross. She put concept and new ideas before any technical obedience to common skills or more formal practice of established methods and techniques.
- 1974–1975: Post Graduate Studies at Victorian College of the Arts.
- 1976: Part-time lecturer at Caulfield Institute of Technology.
- (Date): Secured funded artist in residencies in New York and later Germany, and the New York skyline became a feature in his work.
- (date?): Returned to Ballarat to live at the family home in Loch Avenue after a relationship breakdown in Melbourne.
- Late 1980s & 90s: Reconnected with Ballarat artists such as Alec Cimera, Les Sprague and Pete Widmer & met at the Mallow Hotel for passionate discussions about art. But became increasingly reclusive.
- Moved to a small 2-bedroom flat in Peel Street North, One bedroom was full of his art and the rest was dark and grungy with the tobacco perfume thick.
- It was now not so well disguised that life had become increasingly difficult for him, however, as Peter Widmer said, Ray also suffered from something else; "The Foolishnes of Making Things" but this remained his primary source of fuel and meaning.
- Died c 21 December, Ballarat, not long before his 73rd birthday.
- 30 June 2024: "A Day for Ray" was held at Art Gallery Ballarat, attended by many of the artists and fellow students who had been inspired in some way by him. No-one had learned of his death until some time later. It was there decided to create this Wikipedia entry.

== His Work ==
Ray Woolard was strongly influenced by Cornell, Beuys and he loved Dada, ‘Pop’ and Performance Art and remained true to these formative Influences.

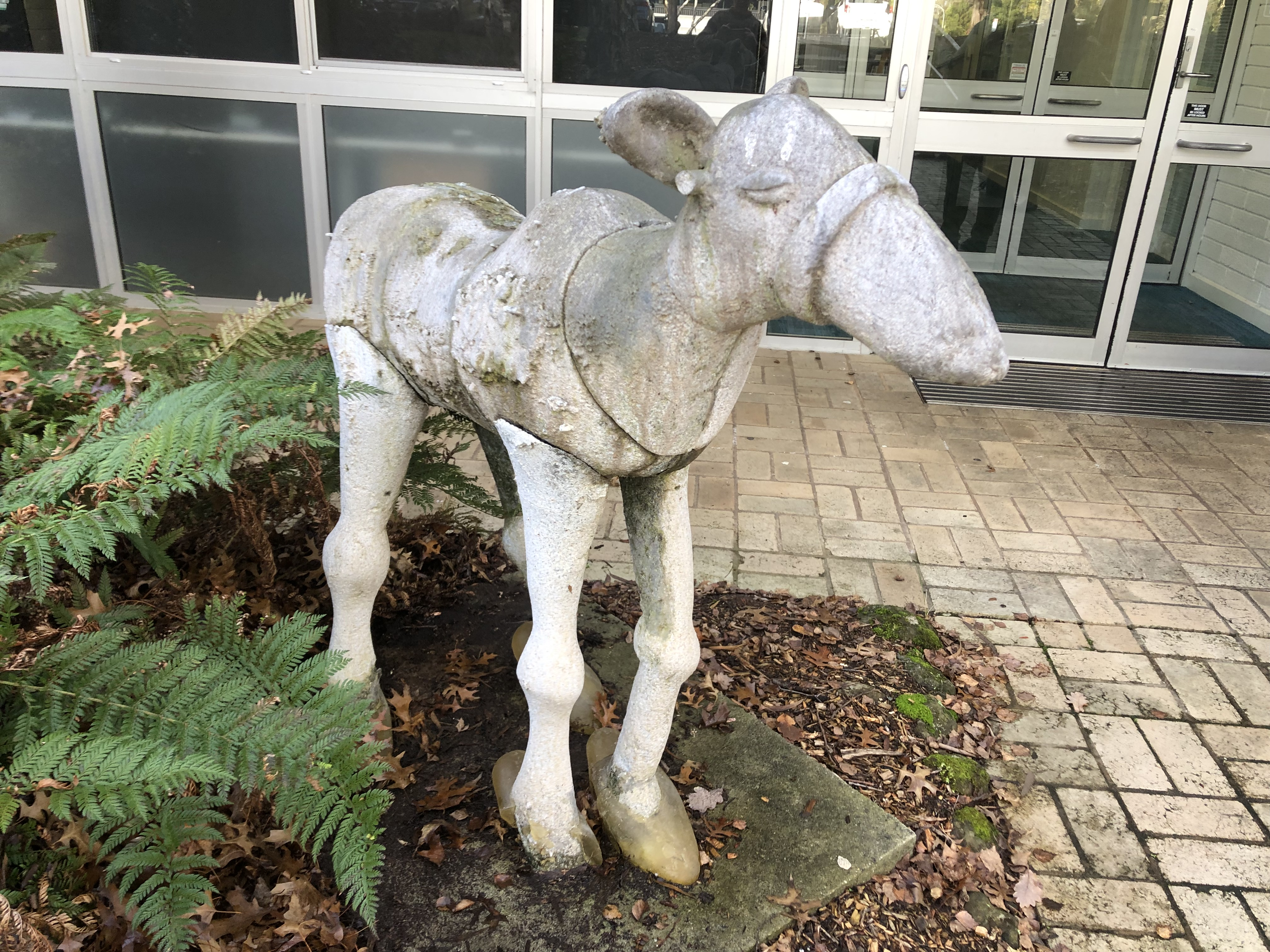

"During one holiday the Moose was made using the lost wax method. The interlocking shapes of polystyrene sections were buried in fine sand with a protruding ‘runner’. Smelting the ingots, pouring, retrieving and dunking. There were some long and dirty days. By hell - he worked hard."

== Exhibitions ==
- 1973: Exhibited at Mildura Sculpture Triennial.

1976 & 1979: Exhibited in the 6th and 7th Mildura's Sculpture Triennial.

- 1976: Some Recent Art from the Ballarat Region, 1976, Ballarat Fine Art Gallery. Lorraine Jenyns, Bob Jenyns, Edward Parfenovics, Peter Tyndall, Peter Westwood, Ray Woolard, Michael Young. Curated by Director, Ron Radford.

1976: New Orleans ('Ninth National Sculpture Convention) 1977, April: 'Dog Performance', Tolarno Gallery, Melbourne. 1978: Germany 1979: Linz, Austria 1979: Sydney Biennale.

- 1980: Benalla Art Gallery, 15 Sculptors. Group show. Ray Woolard, Jock Clutterbuck, Peter Cole, John Davis, Elwyn Dennis, Bonita Ely, Jacek Grzelecki, Noelene Lucas, Adrian Mauriks, Kevin Mortenson, Fiona Orr, Trefor Prest, Colin Suggett, Sue Vaughan, David Wilson.
- 1984: New Sculptors, New Sculpture, group show at Christine Abrahams Gallery. Ray Woolard and Loretta Quinn, Bruce Armstrong, Peter D. Cole, Lyn Plummer, Fiona Orr, Lenton Parr, Clive Murray-White, Hilary Mais.
- Australian Catholic University exhibited his boxes. (date?)
- c 2002: Art Gallery Ballarat, exhibited in The Window. (Including the two paintings in the above photograph of the Ray Day display.)

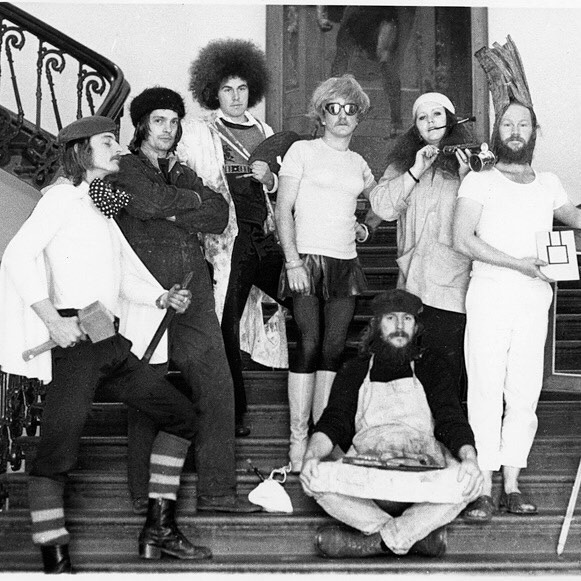

== Awards and grants ==
- 1974: Special Commendation, Elaine Targett Drawing Prize and Sculpture Award.

1974: VAB grant (special project)

- 1975: Visual Arts Board Grant
- 1977: Visual Arts Board Grant (travel)

== Collections ==
His work is found in the collections of Australian National Gallery, ACT; Art Gallery of Ballarat; Federation University Australia; Mildura Art Centre; MOrnington Art Gallery, Holt Primary School, Canberra (National Capital Development Commission for public sculpture). Then Director Art Gallery Ballarat, Margaret Rich bought Ray Woolard's "Dog Boxes" from Galerie Duchamp from the "Back to the 70's" exhibition, circa 1989.

== Reviews ==
"While completing his post-graduate studies at Victorian College of the Arts, Melbourne, Ray Woolard showed a very large steel structure at the Mildura Biennial. Amongst the great number of exhibits Alan McCulloch noted that it was a memorable image, large enough to walk amongst."

Alan McCulloch wrote, "Certain pieces in this huge exhibition stand out in the memory. One is Ray Woolard's platformed avenue of steel, buff-coloured 'view finders' in Deakin Avenue.

Jeffrey Makin, art critic for the Sun wrote, "These arts students are better informed, more talented, better trained, and more professional that their predecessors and they deserve the professional launching afforded them by their respective art schools ... Ray Woolard perhaps the most outrageously inventive of the group. In pieces like Shoes, Woolard is at his best - flirting with contextual changes and sexy fragments, rephrased within an otherwise correct environment".

Allan McCulloch said, "His work moved successively from constructions in steel to the fragile 'Cake Stands', 1977, in wire, wood, feathers and string, and thence to the clinically conceived 'Plastic Man' of 1978.

== Catalogues & Books ==
Radford, Ron (1976) Some Recent Art from the Ballarat Region, 1976, Ballarat Fine Art Gallery.

Mildura Sculpture Triennial, 1973, 1975, 1978.

Scarlett, Ken (1980), Australian Sculptors. West Melbourne, Vic.: Thomas Nelson (Australia). ISBN 0-17-005292-3

First Australian Sculpture Triennial, Latrobe University and Preston Institute of Technology, Victoria, 1981.

McCulloch, Alan (1984). Encycloaedia of Australian Art, Vol2. Hutchison Hawthorn Vic.
