= Mark Strizic =

20th-century Australian photographer and artist

- Born: 19 April 1928; Berlin, Germany
- Died: 8 December 2012 (aged 84); Wallan, Victoria, Australia
- Education: self-taught
- Known for: Photography
- Movement: Modernism
- Spouse: Sue

Mark Strizic (Croatian spelling: Strižić) was a 20th-century German-born Australian photographer, teacher of photography, and artist. Best known for his architectural and industrial photography, he was also a portraitist of significant Australians, and fine art photographer and painter known for his multimedia mural work.

Strizic and other post-war immigrant photographers Wolfgang Sievers, Henry Talbot, Richard Woldendorp, Bruno Benini, Margaret Michaelis, Dieter Muller, David Mist and Helmut Newton brought modernism to Australian photography.

== Early life and migration ==
Marko Strizic was born in 1928 in Berlin, Germany, where his Croatian father, Zdenko Strižić (1902–1990), was studying and practising architecture (later becoming a professor of architecture His mother was a textile designer, trained in Berlin, who contributed to Zdenko's practice. In 1934, in reaction to Adolf Hitler's appointment as chancellor, the family fled to Zagreb, Yugoslavia (now Croatia). There Strizic began to study physics and geology.

At the end of WW2, Strizic fled to Austria as a refugee following the liberation of Yugoslavia to escape the Communist regime. As there was a five-year waiting period to emigrate to the United States, he decided to go instead to Australia. He departed Naples on the converted Royal Australian Navy seaplane carrier SS Hellenic Prince, arriving in Melbourne in on Anzac Day, 25 April 1950.

== Australia ==
Strizic's good spoken English soon gained him a position as a clerk with the Victorian Railways Reclamation Department, and he resumed his studies in physics part-time at the Royal Melbourne Institute of Technology.

In 1952 he married Hungarian-born Sue. They settled in Richmond, subsequently renovating and moving into a large two-storey terrace at 61 Park Street, South Yarra, to South Melbourne and Kew, and finally to Wallan in country Victoria, living there until his death in 2012.

In 2013 a bushfire destroyed his home and studio and his entire collection of prints, though the State Library Victoria had acquired the majority of his negatives in 2007.

Sue Strizic died in 2015.

== Photography ==
Strizic bought his first camera, a Diaxette and began to photograph his environment, developing a love of strong light which he found abundant under the clear skies of his adopted city. In 1987 his exhibition notes for The 1950s – Photographs by Mark Strizic, which launched a book illustrated with the same images, and shown at the Gryphon Gallery of the Melbourne College of Advanced Education, in which Strizic discusses his motivation in taking up the camera;

These pictures reveal my response to a new environment. Photography at that time was far from my ambition (I was devoted to a loftier calling). It was to be the end of that decade before photography became my sole income. At that time the names of Kertesz and Brassaï (not to mention Friedlander) were unknown to me, and photography as something intriguing only became [gradually] apparent ... The mood of these pictures may betray a somber or nostalgic soul lost in a new country, but that is very far from my feelings at that time. I was exhilarated by the opulence of Australia in contrast to Europe – mesmerized by the acute light and over-joyed by my recent marriage.

He enjoyed shooting into the sun contre-jour, and capturing low afternoon side-lighting effects for their high-contrast graphic silhouettes in black and white prints, and that became his signature style for his historically and culturally significant photographs of post-war Melbourne. Photography was a tool he used in his studies in physics, which in 1957 he abandoned for a career in the medium, in which he was encouraged by his father (who visited Melbourne in 1957 as guest professor at the School of Architecture Melbourne University); Zdenko Strižić had only recently exhibited his own collection of photographs, of the traditional architecture of Zagreb, and published a limited-edition book of high-quality reproductions of them, Svjetla i sjene ('Light and Shadows').

== Commercial career ==
Strizic and James S. Bigham formed a partnership in a photography business at 1 Beech Street, Surrey Hills before moving it to Strizic's home at 1 Francis Street, Richmond. Friendship with David Saunders, (who had stayed with Strizic's parents in Yugoslavia in 1952) a senior lecturer in architecture at the University of Melbourne who was then acting assistant director at the National Gallery of Victoria, provided Strizic with increasingly frequent photography commissions. In 1957 Saunders introduced him to Leonard French, an artist and the gallery's exhibitions officer, who asked him to document exhibitions, including the 1959 retrospective of cabinet maker Schulim Krimper's furniture.

Postwar industrialisation in Australia led then to work for mining company BHP, civil engineers Humes Limited and manufacturers McPhersons, photographing the plants, manufacturing, products and workers for annual reports and advertising, while the concurrent housing boom provided further opportunities. Strizic dissolved his partnership with Bigham on the latter's retirement in 1960, and established his studio, neighbouring those of other photographers, in Collins Street, Melbourne in what was known as 'The Paris End'. His clients there included Westminster Carpets whose advertisements of the mid-60s featured his interiors and are unusual in including a credit line to the photographer.

In 1968 he was official stills photographer on director Tim Burstall's 2000 Weeks. A Two Thousand Weeks 'photo novel', illustrated with stills by Strizic and the film's director of photography, Robin Copping, with layout design by Strizic, was published by Sun Books as a movie tie-in in late 1968.

In 1984 he became a full-time artist, photographer and designer and the winner of a number of photographic awards and grants. He found a market for large scale mural installations amongst corporate clients and exhibited artistic works in the same media, work he continued into the late 1990s.

Over several years during the mid-1980s Strizic was resident artist documenting the cultural activities of the City of Knox from which he produced two murals for the Council foyer. He participated with artist Rex Keogh and composer Geoffrey D'ombrain in recording their community participation art events later exhibited at Knox and at the Arts Ministry.

== Visual critique of Australian culture ==
Again through Saunders, in 1958, Strizic met modernist Robin Boyd of architectural firm Grounds, Romberg and Boyd, who became a major client. Boyd controversially criticised Australian suburban culture in his book The Australian Ugliness of 1960, and Strizic echoed these sentiments in writing, and in his photography began to illustrate Australians' disdain for their architectural heritage and their scant regard for the visual aesthetics of their urban environment amidst the destruction of magnificent Gold Rush era buildings and verandahs and their replacement by high-rise modernist office-blocks. This work was widely published in architectural books and journals but also illustrated social commentary during this period of a national identity crisis with frequent contributions of his photo-essays on a wide range of subjects to Walkabout, Overseas trading, The Bulletin, Australia Today and other magazines, and a range of books illustrated with his photographs.

In 1960 Strizic joined David Saunders to produce Melbourne: A Portrait, stating 'Its central thought is that while men make cities, the cities also affect the men.' The Age book reviewer Richard Troy described Strizic's contribution; "The photography is startlingly imaginative and startlingly beautiful—beautiful, not in the sense of the word as movie-advertisement copy writers use it, but in the sense that truth is beautiful".

By the turn of the century Strizic's urban record of Melbourne of the 1950s and 1960s was regarded as of historical interest, as National Gallery of Victoria photography curator Isobel Crombie remarked in a 1999 interview;

"He captured the essence or the place at that particular time...the mixture of 19th century and modern bulldlnga. He alerts us to the fact Melbourne was undergoing massive change – a process of modernisation"

That is the tenor of books of his photography that appeared at this time by Emma Matthews, Judith Buckrich and Rees Barrett

Sydney Morning Herald critic Robert McFarlane in 1997 emphasises Strizic's European eye, comparing him to Robert Frank as an "illuminated outsider", one whose images of Australian urban society are often droll, and their design revealing;

"...a well-established, unorthodox visual sense, often placing important details near the edges of his pictures. Strizic also occasionally applies a sense of geometry to his final cornpsitions not dissimilar to that of Mondrian .... early street scenes show the influence of his European vision, often concentrating on small figures juxtaposed against harsh, unfeeling urban settings ... In View from Sydney Harbour Bridge, 1959 the 31-year-old Strizic beautifully expresses the convoluted geometry of the upper structure of the Bridge from a vantage point that I assume was dangerously high in the arch. It is an image of delicacy and graphic power that the late Andrew [sic] Kertesz might have enjoyed making, had he ever strayed this far south."

== Portraitist ==
Strizic made portraits of significant Australians including academics, scientists and those involved in the arts and these are held in collections including those of the Australian National Gallery, the National Gallery of Victoria and the State Library of Victoria. The majority were shown in 1968 in Some Australian personalities – an exhibition of photographic portraits by Mark Strizic, at the Verdon Gallery, National Gallery of Victoria, 24 May-9 June and reviewed dismissively as 'posed' and 'self-conscious', by Melbourne Age painting critic Patrick McCaughey. These were augmented for the expensively produced 1,200 copy limited-edition book Involvement, conceived and commissioned by philanthropist Andrew Grimwade, with an introduction by Geoffrey Dutton. The collaboration of Strizic with painter Clifton Pugh involved the photography of the 41 significant Australians included, whom Pugh painted during his career. In his 1969 review of the book, launched 7 February, writer Clive Turnbull enthused over the 'complementarity' of the portraits of the same people in the two different media. Strizic used 35mm at a time when medium or large format was the norm for portraiture, and his use of long focal lengths, available light and aura-enhancing shallow depth of field sets the sitter into their environment.

In a 2017 article, Gael Newton, who until 3 years prior was Senior Curator of Australian and International Photography at the National Gallery of Australia, in accounting for his portrait style, draws a link between Strizic's stills photography on Tim Burstall's film 2000 Weeks, his experimentation since the 1960s with a 35mm 'snapshot' aesthetic and his collaboration with Clifton Pugh on Involvement;

Strizic's rather cinematic technique saw his sitters glimpsed almost secretly through blurred foreground objects, or against dappled backdrops and into the light, causing flare. He embedded the person in their environment – artist-craftsman Matcham Skipper for example, is seen through the wrought iron screens he was completing for the entrance to the Australian National University's H. C. Coombs building; and merchant's son turned cattle-breeder Douglas Carnegie is seen at work in the feed shed from the viewpoint of one of his Herefords. Businessman and philanthropist Sir Ian Potter's head and shoulders are seen at the bottom of the image, against the blurred lights of Times Square, where Strizic was sent to photograph him for the book.

Strizic's output in the genre was considerable; those he photographed included Karl Duldig, Sir Ian Potter, Harold Hughan, Shulim Krimper, Clifford Last, Inge King, Lenton Parr, Fred Williams, Vincent Jomantas, Norma Redpath, John Brack, Ian B. Sprague, Dr Joseph Brown, Noel Counihan, Rudy Komon, T. Zikaras, Arthur Boyd, John Perceval, Rhonda Senbergs, photographer David Roberts, Barry Humphries, Dr Ernest Fooks, his father Prof. Zdenko Strizic, Chief Librarian Colin Alexander McCallum, Marilyn Hill, Dr. E. Graeme Robertson, Dr. Noel Macainsh, Dr. Antal Zador, Geoffrey Dutton, Father Michael Scott, Professor A. R. Chisholm, John Howley, Barry Jones AO, Michael Shannon, Leonard French, Sir Charles Moses, Sir Macfarlane Burnet, Mayor of South Melbourne Doris Catherine Condon, Anne Hall, Asher Bilu, Charles Blackman, Alexander Buzo, Sir Samuel Wadham, Les Gray, Clifton Pugh, Peter O'Shaughnessy, Frank Dalby Davison, David Tolley, Owen Webster, John Olsen, Robin Boyd, Tim Burstall, Matcham Skipper, Professor Richard Downing, Georges Mora, and Tom Sanders.

== Fine art ==
From 1958, Strizic exhibited almost annually in group, joint, and solo shows. Having exhibited in Melbourne's Twelve ·Best Buildings jointly at the National Gallery of Victoria with Athol Shmith in 1958, Strizic become the first photographer to exhibit there solo in 1968 and the first whose work was acquired by the National Gallery of Australia.

He began combining, enlarging, cropping and transforming elements from his black and white negatives through montage, then colourising and posterising the monochrome images in the manner associated with Pop Art. A major exposure of these was in the Australian Pavilion of Expo '74 in Spokane, commissioned by the Australian Government.

Symbols of urban ugliness such as power poles and billboards were his subject matter and critical target in often apocalyptic imagery intended to provoke a social consciousness. As artist and critic James Gleeson expressed it in a 1973 review:

"The essential ugliness has been glossed with beauty; and this is because Strizic's eye is instinctively selective. From an infinite range of possible shots it selects the ones in which the truth is armatured on a structure of formal beauty. His photographs are about ugliness. but as photographs they are not ugly. Strizic constructs vast and colourful murals [...] that are to be read as decorative abstracts. It comes as something of a shock to realise that these apparently non-figurative schemes are often evolved from a single figurative motif.

Critic and director of the Art Gallery of New South Wales Daniel Thomas responded enthusiastically to the same show at Holdsworth Galleries, Woollahra of Strizic's "large, colour-printed mirror-image compositions, two-art and four-part from the same subjects", calling them "extremely good" and "gorgeous".

Opening The Fall of the Shadow at Church Street Photographic Centre on 15 November 1977, Patrick McCaughey, professor of Fine Arts at Monash University who summarily dismissed the photographer's monochrome portraits in 1968, approached the discordant application of colour in Strizic's montages with appreciation;

These photographs, then, don't just disturb taste and expectation – they enlarge them. They make us see colour in photography differently, offering a way out for photography from the ironic "good taste" it falls easy prey to in black and white. Whimsy and sentiment, so often the accompaniments of good taste, are similarly kept at bay by Strizic's sharp and abrasive colour. ... The final effects are not cheaply surreal. The photograph's hold on reality is too strong for that. Yet for photography they are strangely and remarkably interiorized images of a world sensed within as well as perceived without, the product of a superior photographic imagination which remakes the craft and bends it to his constructive purpose.

In the next decade, the reaction amongst the established photographic community to Strizic's radical change of direction was one of confusion. Prominent senior Australian photographer Max Dupain, in reviewing a landmark 1983 survey of Australian photography at Albury Regional Gallery in which he exhibited flower studies, represents this ambivalence:

The outstanding tour de force comes from Mark Strizlc's 16 pictures made during the 50s to the present day. The early scenes are simple with special attention to the direction or light: "Ordinary things seen as extraordinary" (Weston).

In the later work this fundament has evolved to a mystic eloquence as he takes us on a metaphysical journey through a fantasia of obscure shapes and semi-identifiable forms submerged in a kind of abstract intensity.

Most of these pictorial outpourings are not as large as life; they are concerned with the petty events of personal experiences and not the quality that marks the dreams and adventures of man. The significance of time and destiny does not exist–only the sense of the trivial which is rife in much photography now.

It is a symptom of Western decline such as Spengler identifies with impressionist art: Rembrandt's mighty landscapes (in his portraits) lie esentially [sic] in the universe, Manet's near the railway station.

However, the judge for the same Albury exhibition, NGA curator Helen Ennis, identified print manipulation as a "keynote", noting that "the straight photograph, black and white or colour is hardly to be found" in all the contemporary work shown, especially by exhibitors Miriam Stannage, Allan Vizents, Kathie Crawford, Merryl Johnson, and more extreme instances in the work of Kate Breakey and Leonie Reisberg, which contextualise her comment on Strizic's submission;

Mark Strizic is represented with a selection of manipulated work. It is a fitting inclusion, given that the photographs span the last two decades and Strizic's reputation as principally, a black and white photographer

After the passage of a further 20 years, in 1992, Strizic's manipulation of his 1950s negatives was considered outmoded by Age critic Greg Neville in his review of concurrent shows by the photographer;

A Celebration is a recent body of work made with negatives from the 1950s but using modern darkroom techniques, which alter the images by addling color and sandwiching several images together. The source photos are of Edna Everage types with nudes or shadows superimposed. They are about "conventionality, decorum and protocol" but the result Is an unhappy mixture of nostalgia and psychedelic color. Much more appealing are Strizic's' photographs from the '50s and '60s in Melbourne Life, which have a charm and wit that is missing from the arty excesses of his later work.

Strizic was an early adopter of digital imaging techniques in producing such murals, through processes Strizic discussed in an address to Still Photography? an international symposium on digital imaging, Melbourne, 4–8 April 1994".

For critic Robert McFarlane writing in 1997, Strizic's concentration after the early '80s on "large-scale corporate and civic murals, using painting, photography and new computer technologies" displaces photography so that "...the core vision that established his reputation, appears now to be an almost watertight compartment in his career."

Strizic's work is represented in the Australian National Gallery and several state galleries and in corporate collections. He was also a collector of significant Australian art himself, and as early as 1974 lent works by John Perceval, whom he photographed 2 years later, to Marianne Baillieu for a show at her gallery Realities.

== Influence ==
Strizic taught photography at workshops at the Church Street Photographic Centre in 1978, alongside John Cato, Robert Imhoff and Ian Cosier. after having in 1975 commenced a 10-year period lecturing at a number of tertiary educational institutions which augmented his artistic practice; Preston (Phillip) Institute of Technology (1975–1977) to which he was recruited by fashion photographer Henry Talbot; Melbourne College of Advanced Education (Lecturer in Charge of Photography 1977–1982); and as part-time lecturer in Photography at the Victorian College of the Arts (1982–1984). He presented a public lecture An Experience in Photography, at the University of Melbourne Institute of Education on 20 May 1992

== Books by, about or illustrated by Strizic ==
- Barrett, Rees D (2009), 1950-1975 : building modern Australia, Macmillan Education, ISBN 978-1-4202-6623-8
- Beatty, B., & Beatty, W. A. (1966). Around Australia with Bill Beatty. Cassell Australia.
- Buckrich, Judith Raphael; Dunstan, Keith; Storey, Rohan; Strizic, Mark (2005). Collins : the story of Australia's premier street. Australian Scholarly Publishing. ISBN 978-1-74097-057-0.
- Burstall, Tim. & Ryan, Patrick. 1968, Two thousand weeks [Book designed by Mark Strizic & George Smith] Sun Books, Melbourne.
- De Stoop, Wivine; Smith, Penny (January 1981), The pleasure of the table : the cooking artistry of Wivine de Stoop, Macmillan (published 1981), ISBN 978-0-333-33747-9
- Edquist, H., & Black, R. (2009). The Architecture of Neil Clerehan. RMIT Publishing.
- Gray, Garrick. & Strizic, Mark. & Steinward, Uwe. ([197-?]). The Garrick Australian picture book. Melbourne : G. Gray
- Howley, John. & Strizic, Mark. (1971). The phallic totem witness series. [S.l : s.n]
- Kennedy, Graham (1967). Graham Kennedy's Melbourne. Thomas Nelson (Australia)
- Lees, Stella; Senyard, June E. (1987), The 1950s ... how Australia became a modern society, and everyone got a house and car, Hyland House, ISBN 978-0-947062-10-1
- Lane, Terence & Strizic, Mark & Krimper, Schulim. (1987). Schulim Krimper : cabinet-maker : a tribute. South Yarra, Victoria: Gryphon Books
- Desk diary 1965 : the seasons, National Gallery of Victoria, 1964
- Macainsh, Noel and Pugh, Clifton. (1962) Clifton Pugh [photography by Mark Strizic] Georgian House, Melbourne
- Potts, J. D. S. (1966). Australian outrage: the decay of a visual environment. Ure Smith.
- Pugh, Clifton & Strizic, Mark & Grimwade, Andrew Sheppard (1968). Involvement : the portraits of Clifton Pugh and Mark Strizic; The work. Melbourne : Sun Books
- Guide to Victorian architecture, 1956: A brief illustrated record of architectural development in Victoria, and in Melbourne the capital. Melbourne: Royal Victorian Institute of Architects, 1956.
- Spate, V. (1963). John Olsen. Georgian House.
- Stirling, A. (1967). Melbourne in Colour and Black-and-white. Lansdowne.
- Strizic, Mark. (2003). Mark Strizic : a journey in photography Monash Gallery of Art, Wheelers Hill, Victoria
- Strizic, Mark. (1984). Town country and soul : photographic works by Mark Strizic. Bedford Park, South Australia : Flinders University Art Museum
- Strizic, Mark & Saunders, David. 1960). Melbourne : a portrait. Melbourne : Georgian House
- Strizic, Mark; Matthews, Emma; Jones, Barry (2009), Mark Strizic : Melbourne: marvellous to modern (1st ed.), Thames & Hudson Australia; Melbourne : published in association with State Library of Victoria, ISBN 978-0-500-50019-4

== Exhibitions ==
- 1958: Melbourne's Twelve Best Buildings, National Gallery of Victoria (with Athol Shmith)
- 1961: Photovision 1961, Museum of Modern Art Australia,
- 1963: Mark Strizic photography, Argus Gallery, 290 La Trobe Street, 11–22 February
- 1965: with Robert Grieve, Japanese Images, Argus Gallery, Melbourne
- 1968: Some Australian personalities – an exhibition of photographic portraits by Mark Strizic, Verdon Gallery, National Gallery of Victoria, 24 May-9 June.
- 1970, February: with Fred Lowen, furniture, Melbourne Transformation, South Yarra
- 1971: with Stan Ostoja-Kotkowski, John Cato, Peter Medlen and John Wilkins in Frontiers, National Gallery of Victoria
- 1973: For the Record: A visual essay on the urban environment, Holdsworth Galleries, Woollahra, June/July
- 1977: The fall of the shadow – Mark Strizic, Church Street Photographic Centre, Richmond, Melbourne, opened by Patrick McCaughey, 16 November – 4 December.
- 1978: Works for Books and Other Projects, opened by Prof. Patrick McCaughey, 1st floor, Main Library, Monash University, 5 Aug – 9 Sep
- 1982: Synergetic Images, Knox City Council foyer
- 1982: Synergetic Images, with Rex Keogh and composer Geoffrey D'ombrain, foyer, Arts Ministry, Public Curator's Building, Exhibition Street, Melbourne
- 1983: National Photographic Exhibition. Judge: Helen Ennis, curatorial assistant, Dept. of Photography, Australian National Gallery. Albury Regional Gallery, 7 Oct – 6 Nov
- 1984: Town, country and soul – photographic works by Mark Strizic, Gryphon Gallery [Melbourne], 26 March-13 April
- 1987: The 1950s – photographs by Mark Strizic, launching the book Lees, Stella; Senyard, June E (1987), The 1950s ... how Australia became a modern society, and everyone got a house and car, Hyland House, ISBN 978-0-947062-10-1, Blue Room, 1888 Building, Melbourne Council of Adult Education, 26–29 Aug.
- 1987: The 1950s – photographs by Mark Strizic, Gryphon Gallery [Melbourne], 16–20 October.
- 1987: Photographs by John Cato, Wolfgang Sievers, Mark Strizic 1955–75 (Aspects of Victorian photography I), National Gallery of Victoria, Photography Gallery, third floor, 2 April-19 June
- 1988: Melbourne 1954 – 1964, Christine Abrahams Gallery Richmond, Victoria 26 September – 13 October
- 1998: Modern furniture Melbourne 1960s–1980s as photographed by Mark Strizic, The Cardigan Street Gallery, 12 December 1997 – 26 January
- 1989: Mark Strizic – paintings and collages, Acland Street Art Gallery St Kilda, Victoria, 6 September-6 October
- 1990: The Alice Show, Mark Strizic painting, with works by Peter Nelson, Charles Blackman, Clifton Pugh, John Perceval, John Coburn, Jenny Watson, Deborah Klein, Caroline Williams, Mirka Mora, Robert Juniper, Doris Gingingara, Lin Onus, Pam Pilgrim, Patricia Trevillien, Heather Wilson, Alan Sumner, Kazuko Eguchi and others. City Square Melbourne, August
- 1992: Recent Acquisitions, Waverley City Gallery, 170 Jells Rd, Wheelers Hill, to 5 April
- 1992: Melbourne life', Lower Melbourne Town Hall. 7–30 September
- 1992: Mark Strizic – A Celebration, Christine Abrahams Gallery Richmond, Victoria, September – 8 October
- 1992: In Lyric Mode, recent paintings by Mark Strizic, Acland Art, Customs Wharf Art and Craft Centre, 126 Nelson Pl. Williamstown, to 20 December
- 1993: Inner sanctum – Noel Flood – ceramic sculpture, Werner Hammerstingl – photography and mixed media, Mark Strizic – photography and mixed media, Doncaster Gallery [Melbourne], 3–21 December.
- 1995: Melbourne in the '60s – an exhibition of photographs by Mark Strizic, Christine Abrahams Gallery Richmond, Victoria, 14–31 August 1995.
- 1995/6:Photographs by Mark Strizic; a selection from Melbourne in the '50s and '60s, Old Treasury Building, Melbourne, 8 December 1995 – 26 January 1996
- 1996: Unity of fragmentation – paintings on prepared canvas & associated works by Mark Strizic. Quadrivium, 2–50 Level 2 South, Queen Victoria Building, George Street, Sydney, 20 February – 12 March.
- 1996-7: Late modernism Melbourne – an exhibition of photographs by Mark Strizic, 1996, Cardigan Street Gallery, 12 December 1996 – 26 January
- 1997: Quadriviium, Unity of Fragmentation, paintings on canvas and associated works, Level 2, Queen Victoria Building, Sydney
- 1997: Mark Strizic: A Survey, Lauraine Diggins, 5 Malakoff Street, Caulfield North, to 21 May
- 1997: Mark Strizic, Byron Mapp Gallery, 178 Oxford Street, Paddington, June to 6 July
- 1997: In the Cold, works from the National Gallery of Australia's collection of international and Australian photographs, with Diane Arbus, Bill Brandt, Henri Cartier-Bresson, Max Dupain, Geelong Art Gallery, Little Malop Street, Geelong, to 24 August
- 1998: Modern Furniture Melbourne 1960s-1980s, Cardigan Street Gallery
- 1999: Mark Strizic : contre jour, Lauraine Diggins Fine Art, 24 February–27 March
- 1999: Mark Strizic : contre jour, Greenaway Art Gallery, 31 March – 25 April. Catalogue essay by Emma Matthews
- 1999: Evoking the Essence of Melbourne, in aid of the National Trust, Le Méridien hotel, Collins Street, Melbourne, from 27 November
- 2000: Striking – Contemporary Australian Photography, with Andrew Curtis, Alan Cruickshank, Bill Henson, Ian Howard, Tania Jovanovic, Christopher Koller, Tracey Moffatt, Polixeni Papapetrou, Patricia Piccinini, Julie Rrap, David Stephenson. Greg Weight and Anne Zahalka. Opened by Robert McFarlane. Monash Gallery of Art touring exhibition at Campbelltown City Bicentennial Art Gallery, Art Gallery Rd. Campbelltown, NSW. 1 – 25 April
- 2000: Frederick Romberg – The Architecture of Migration 1936–1976, with photographs by Strizic, RMIT Gallery, Storey Hall, Swanston Street, Melbourne, to 23 September
- 2000–20011 Unity of Fragmentation: photographs and paintings by Mark Strizic, Hotel Sofitel, 25 Collins Street, Melbourne, December – 31 January
- 2006: Melbourne: Mid-century images, Gallery 101, 101 Collins Street, Melbourne. 14 March – 1 April
- 2012: As Modern as Tomorrow: Photographers in Postwar Melbourne, State Library of Victoria, Keith Murdoch Gallery 1 July 2011 – 5 February 2012

== Murals ==
Include:

- 1974: Australian Pavilion, Spokane Expo. Commissioned by the Australian Government.
- 1984, Nov: Telecom Business Sales Centres in Canberra and Melbourne; acrylics, crayon and pastels on canvas, approx.1.2 x 18m.
- 1984, Dec: Cairns Airport, Australian Airlines Concourse; Superscan print, acrylic paint on canvas, approx. 5x36m
- 1985 Oct: Philip Morris Boardroom, Melbourne, 3 paintings, acrylics and oils on canvas, 2 @ 1.2 x 2.3m, 1 @ 1.2 x 3m.
- 1985, Nov: Mazda H.Q.for Victoria and Tasmania, 37 Lorimer Street, Port Melbourne; acrylics, crayon and pastels on canvas, 3 x 6m
- 1986, Mar: Coles New World Supermarket at Vermont South, Victoria; photographs on Superscan canvas print, approx. 3m x 300m.
- 1986, Mar: Woodside Petroleum Australian H.Q. on the executive level, 40/385 Bourke Street, Melbourne; acrylics, metallic paint, crayon, soft and oil pastels on canvas, 7 panels each 3 x 1.2m.
- 1986 Apr: Knox Civic Centre, 511 Burwood Highway, Knoxfield, Victoria; acrylics, metallic paint and pastels, crayon, soft and Oil pastels on canvas 2- 2x4m
- 1986 Aug: Boronia Public Library, Boronia, Victoria; photographs, acrylics and metallic paint on Superscan canvas print, approx.1·x21m.
- 1986 Sept: AMP Insurance, St James Court, Bourke Street, Melbourne, lst floor St.James Building; pastel and acrylics on canvas,2 murals 2x4m.
- 1987 Feb: Aerospace Technologies of Australia, 226 Lorimer Street, Port Melbourne; photographic collage on Superscan melded fabric print, approx. 1.5 x 7m,
- 1987 Oct: The Australian Wheat Board Mural, 528 Lonsdale Street, Melbourne; acrylics on canvas, approx 3 x 8m.
- 1987 Nov: National Mutual Properties, 2/570 Bourke Street, Melbourne; acrylics and metallic paint with photographic collage on canvas, approx. 5-2 x 1.2m.
- 1988 April: Nancy Hamer Memorial Mural, Monash Medical Centre, Clayton, Victoria; acrylics, oils, pastel, pencil, crayon and metallic paint on canvas, approx. 121.8 x 1.2m.
- 1988 Aug: "ICI Research Group Mural" at ICI Ascot Vale, Victoria; photographic collage, acrylics, oils, metallic paint, oil pastel on canvas, 6 x 5m. Inaugurated 8 August 1988.
- 1988 Oct: Rhapsody on a Theme of Prosperity, McCaughan Dyson Capel Cure (investment brokers), 9/360 Collins Street, Melbourne; acrylics and oiIs on canvas, approx. 1.8 x 6m.
- 1989, Feb: Fantasia for Paint and Brush, Carey Junior Grammar School, Burwood Road, Kew, Victoria; acrylic, pastel soft pastel, oil pastel and oil on canvas, approx. 2x4m.
- 1989, March: The Great Supersign, Superscan Managing Director's Office, Cranbrook Street, Botany, New South Wales; acrylic, pastel, oil and oil pastel on canvas, approx. 3x4.4m.
- 1989, April: Lygon Court Mural, Lygon Court ShoppIng Centre, Lygon Street, Carlton, Victoria; acrylic on canvas, 10.3 x 1.2m.
- 1989, Nov: Telecom Business Service Centre, Henley Beach Road, Mile End, Adelaide; 21 x 1.5m
- 1990, Feb: Alice and the Antipodes 2. 1 x 5. 8m; oil on canvas, and 5 paintings oil with collage on museum board; Telecom Australia conference area in Melbourne.
- 1990, April: The Royal Children's Hospital mural in collaboration with John Howley and Clifton Pugh; 2 murals, each 2.7 x 3.6 m, titled Country-Spring and City-Autumn were donated by the artists to commemorate the opening of new hospital wing and prints were sold at $29 each to raise further funds
- 1991, Jan: The Elwoods Four Seasons, for the Elwoods Restaurant, Victoria; four panels each 1.8 x 1.1 m. acrylic and oil on canvas.
- 1991, March:As The Drum Turns, front office murals for Superscan MMT Los Angeles and Sydney offices; acrylic on Superscan print 2.8 × 4 .4m.
- 1991, Aug: Serendip Wild Life Sanctuary mural at Lara, Victoria, c.9 x 3m.
- 1992, Oct: Alice and the Antipodes 2.1 x 5.8m; oil on canvas and 5 paintings oil with collage on museum board; for Telecom Australia conference area, Melbourne.
- 1993, Apr: Australian Postal Corporation board room murals each 1.6 x 4.8m.
- 1993, July: Gravitas Juventus, 3.0 x 3.6 m; Xavier College – Stephenson Centre, oil on canvas, Kew, Victoria .
- 1993, July: Australian Postal Corporation executive area Epistolary Epigram 1 to 4 each 1. 9 x 1.2m; oil on canvas.
- 1994, Sept: Western Pacific head office of Metromedia Technology International, Brisbane; eight works commissioned by the company
- Queensland University Sports Club
- Flinders University Medical Centre.
- Monash University Library, Clayton, Melbourne.

== Awards ==
The Visual Art/Craft Board's $25,000 Emeritus Fellowship 1993 (also awarded that year to photographer Olive Cotton)
