= Home of the Arts, Gold Coast =

Arts centre in Gold Coast, Queensland, Australia

Coordinates: 28.0015°S 153.4162°E

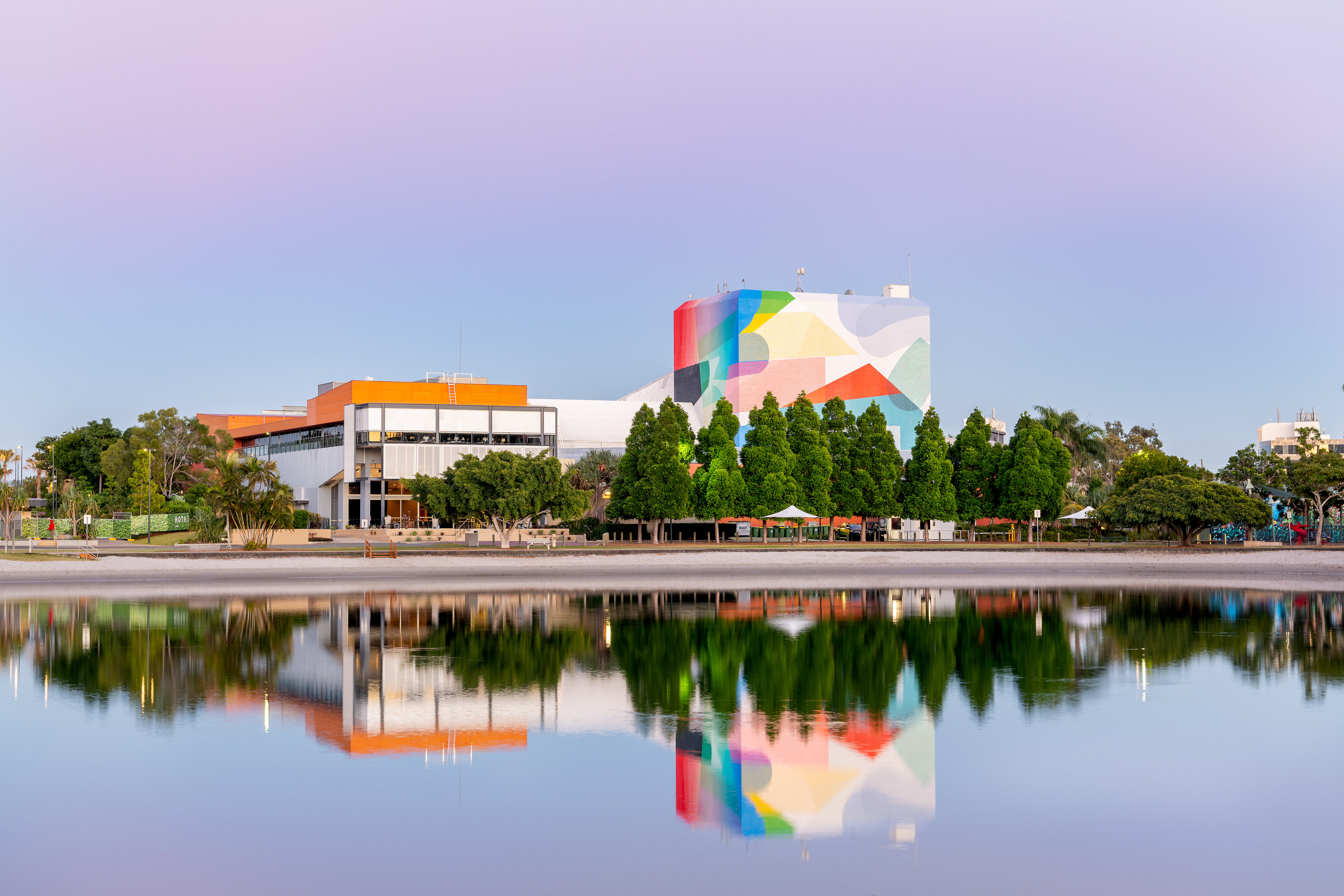
HOTA, Home of the Arts

Home of the Arts (HOTA), opened as the Keith Hunt Community Entertainment and Arts Centre in 1986 and subsequently renamed The Arts Centre Gold Coast (TAC) and Gold Coast Arts Centre, is a cultural precinct situated in Surfers Paradise, City of Gold Coast, Queensland, Australia. HOTA presents live music, theatre, dance, comedy, opera, children's shows, art, and cinema. It is surrounded by parklands and a lake. The HOTA precinct is the centrepiece of the City of Gold Coast Council’s Gold Coast Cultural Precinct masterplan.

HOTA was formerly home to the Gold Coast City Art Gallery, which closed in 2018 to prepare for the opening of the new HOTA Gallery in early 2021.

== History ==
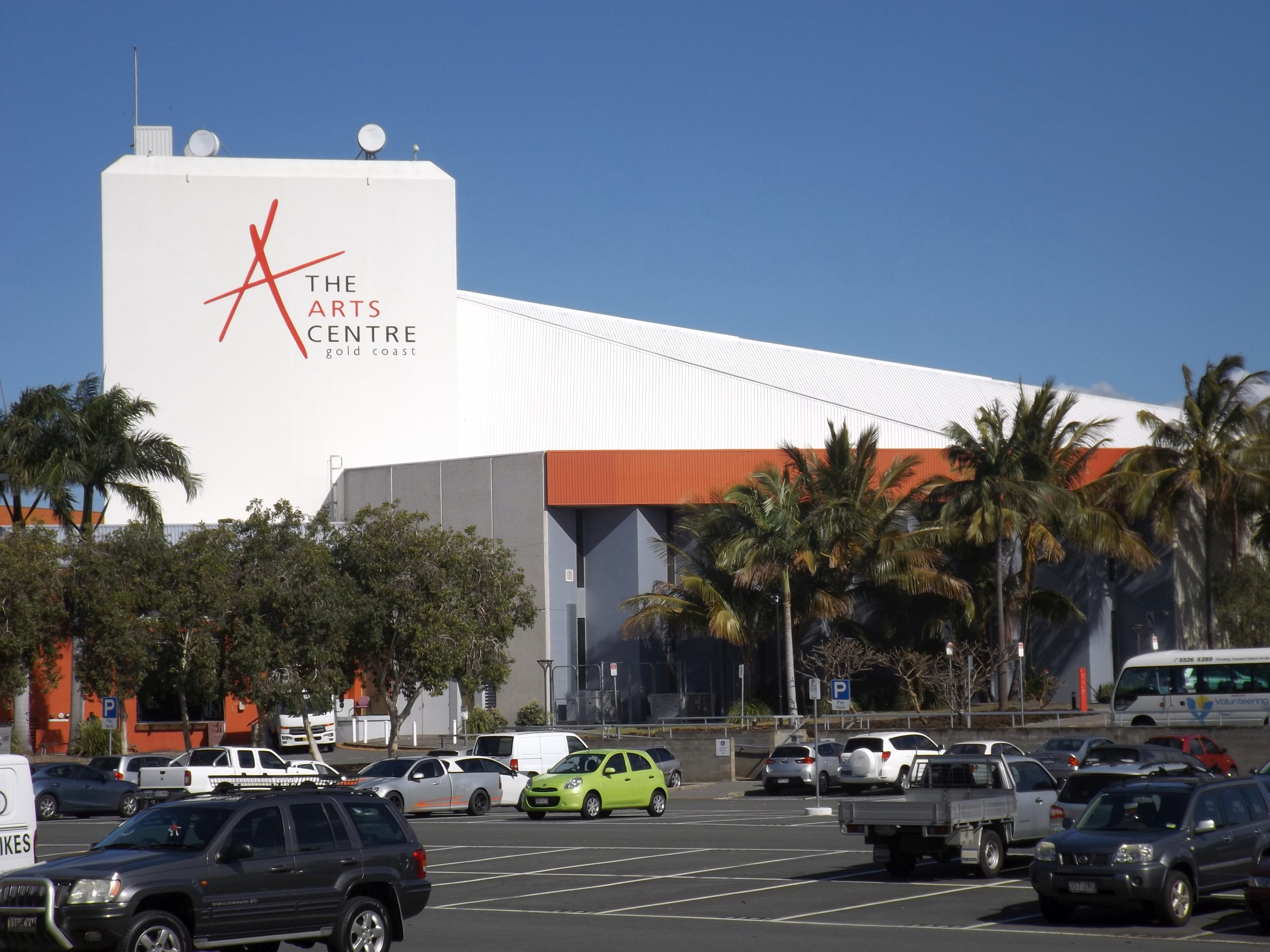
The Arts Centre in 2015.

The land on which HOTA is situated (known as Evandale) was occupied by a thriving Aboriginal community, later (1860s) being settled by European farmers. The City of Gold Coast bought the land in the 1960, and the Evandale Civic and Cultural Centre, designed by local architect Alan Griffith, was opened in 1976.

HOTA was first named the Keith Hunt Community Entertainment and Arts Centre. It was officially opened in December 1986, owned and managed by the council, and was renamed the Gold Coast Arts Centre, which remained until March 2010.

In 1993, the Gold Coast City Council formed the Gold Coast Arts Centre Proprietary Company Limited as a separate legal entity, becoming the sole shareholder in the company and providing the majority of funding. This company continues to exist as of July 2022.

In 1996, the Arts Café was added, with a 2004 extension adding a new cinema, two function rooms and an administration area.

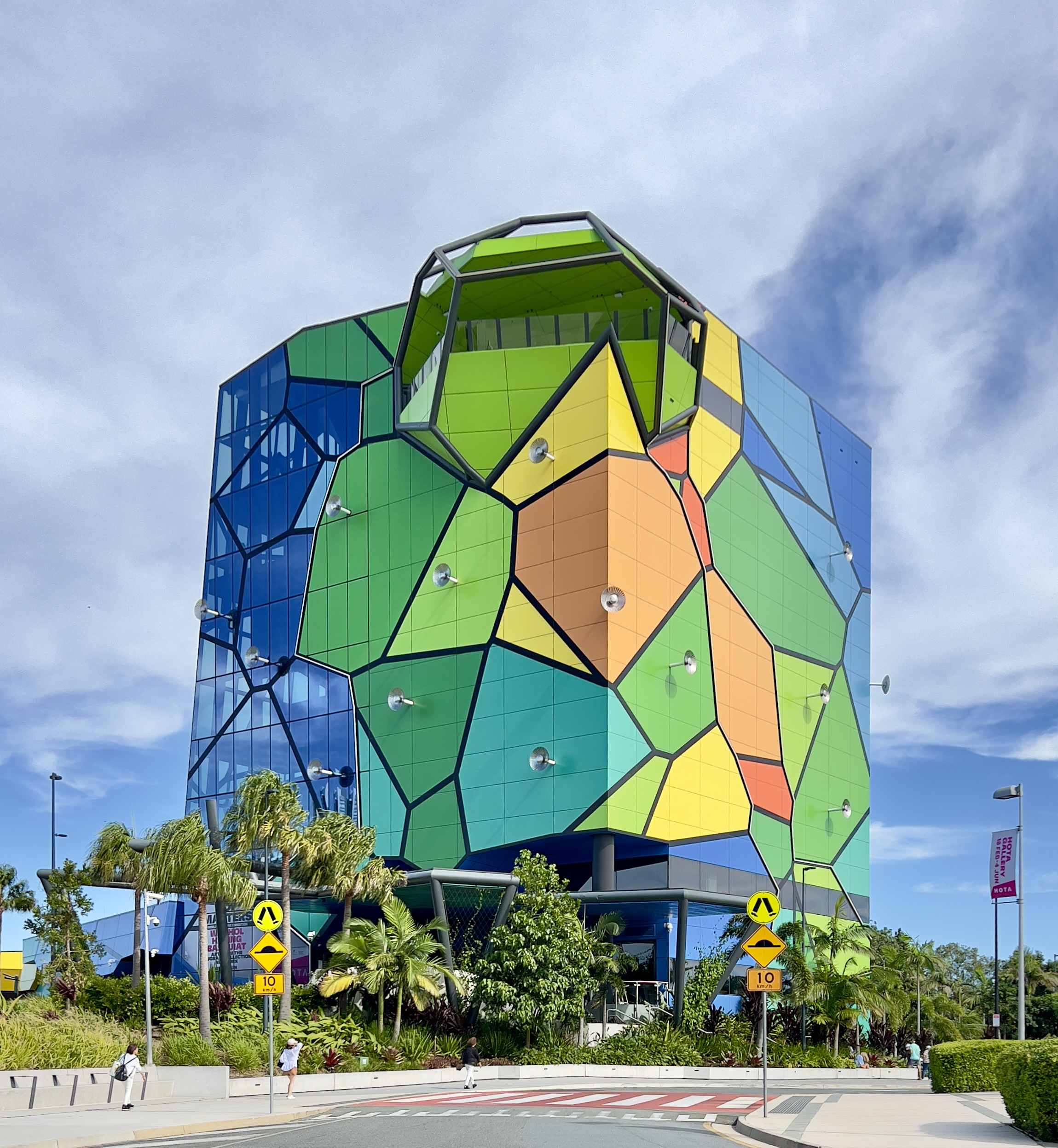
The $60.5 million HOTA Gallery launched in May 2021.

In March 2010, as a result of the new masterplan, the Gold Coast Arts Centre was renamed, rebranded, refurbished and relaunched as The Arts Centre Gold Coast.

In 2013, a competition was held to find an architect to create a new cultural precinct, and ARM Architecture and TOPOTEK 1 won.

In 2018, a fresh rebrand took place and the venue became HOTA, Home of the Arts. Also in 2018, the Gold Coast City Art Gallery closed to make way for a new gallery, which was the largest public gallery outside of a capital city in Australia.

=== The HOTA project ===
Delivery of the A$37.5 million Outdoor Stage marked the completion of Stage 1a of the Masterplan. Stage 1b was the construction of a new bridge to Chevron Island, which improved connectivity to Surfers Paradise. The A$19.5 million bridge crosses between the parklands and a vacant lot on Stanhill Drive, Chevron Island, and was officially opened in early 2020.

The A$60.5m HOTA Gallery (Stage 1b of the project) opened on 8 May 2021.

== Functions and venues ==
HOTA presents live music, theatre, dance, comedy, opera, children's shows, art, and cinema. It is surrounded by Evandale Parklands and Evandale lake. The HOTA precinct is the centrepiece of the City of Gold Coast Council’s Gold Coast Cultural Precinct masterplan.

Home of the Arts includes a number of venues:

- Outdoor Stage
- HOTA Gallery (opened on 8 May 2021)
- Theatre 1, a 1139-seat traditional theatre
- Theatre 2, a smaller black box theatre
- HOTA Cinema
- Panorama Room
- Lakeside Room
- Basement
- Various function rooms and spaces
- HOTA Cafe
- Sculpture Walk
- St. Margaret's Chapel, a non-denominational historic chapel that holds weddings and other receptions.
- Adventure Trail (climb over the Outdoor Stage)
- Lake
- HOPO Ferry stop
- Bridge connecting HOTA to Chevron Island / Surfers Paradise
- Palette, a fine dining restaurant

=== HOTA Gallery ===
The HOTA Gallery, designed by ARM Architecture, houses the A$32 million City Collection, and comprises over 2,000 m^{2} (22,000 sq ft) of exhibition space over six levels, including:

- Main Exhibition Gallery, 1,000 m^{2} (11,000 sq ft) of space designed for large touring exhibitions
- Children's Gallery
- Exhibition space (900 m^{2} (9,700 sq ft)) for the City Collection and temporary exhibitions
- Collection storage and workspaces

=== Outdoor Stage ===
The Outdoor Stage officially opened on 17 March 2018, with a sold-out 3,372 attended performance from Tim Minchin. The outdoor stage is surrounded by parklands and a lake, with views to the Surfers Paradise skyline. The structure is framed by a 100-tonne self-supporting screen that protects performers from sun and glare. The stage is 20 m (66 ft) wide from wall-to-wall and 1.4 m (4 ft 7 in) high (from stage to stage forecourt), and includes a 5.5 tonne bi-fold proscenium door. In November 2024, Kid Laroi set a new attendance record when he performed at the HOTA Outdoor Stage to a sold-out 4,300 crowd in the first leg of his Australian tour.

== Future stages ==
In 2024, City of Gold Coast announced plans to build an 1800-seat lyric theatre within the HOTA precinct to accommodate for 200 new performances a year including musicals, ballet, opera, live music and comedy.

== See also ==
- Gold Coast City Art Gallery
