= Zdenko Strižić =

Croatian architect, urban planner and teacher

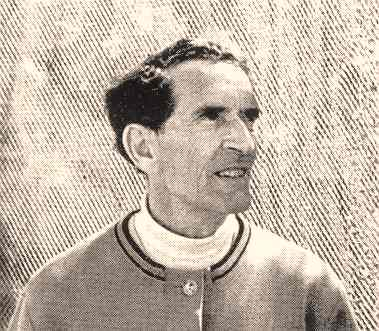
- Portrait of Zdenko Strižić by unknown photographer
- Born: 19 May 1902; Bjelovar, Kingdom of Croatia-Slavonia, Austria-Hungary
- Died: 1 November 1990 (aged 88); Hanover, Germany
- Known for: Architect, urban planner, teacher of architecture

Zdenko Strižić (19 May 1902 – 1 November 1990) was a Croatian architect, urban planner and teacher.

== Education ==
Strižić was the son of Dr. Miroslav and Irena pl. Strižić od Visnjevca and brother of Božidar, Jaroslav, Marcel and Ivan. He studied in Dresden (1921–3). In 1924, he went to Paris to study drawing and painting, creating views of the city and portraits of men and women. Tiring of the transient bohemian life of artistic Paris, in 1925 Strižić went to Berlin, where he enrolled at the Academy. His teacher was the prominent German architect Hans Poelzig. Also during 1925, Strižić went on a short study tour of Venice, drawing vedutas with characteristic Venetian motifs, some of which he was to translate into his architectural design. As a student he met and married a German-born textile designer Henrietta Liedke, who was then studying sculpture, painting and craft in Berlin and who later contributed to Zdenko's practice. Their photographer son Marko was born in 1928.

== Architect ==
After finishing his studies, Strižić continued working for Poelzig's "Meisteratelier" as an assistant. Poelzig entrusted him with work on the Spandau housing estate near Berlin in 1927. Given the influx of population into major cities in Germany after World War I, in the mid-1920s, German architects increasingly turned to a new formal repertoire of social housing, characterized by economisation and efficiency of construction techniques and new layout plans for apartments, settlements and cities. For this purpose, in 1927, architect Mies van der Rohe, then head of the German Werkbund, brought together a team of eminent architects, including Poelzig and his studio. The assembled architects were tasked with jointly designing the Weisendorf neighborhood near Stuttgart, a prototype of future housing estates, in addition to a large exhibition of different types of houses. Some of the Weisendorf experiences, particularly the replacement of artisanal methods of construction with new, industrial methods and the design of ambiences according to the requirements of a new way of life, influenced Strižić's work, so that he also began interior decoration of apartments, designing, with his wife's textiles, ensemble furniture integral to the design, a practice in the spirit of the fundamental principles of CIAM (Congres Internationaux d 'Architecture Moderne).

Military service in Maribor briefly interrupted his collaboration with the Poelzig studio before, in 1928, he undertook, together with his mentor, a succession of projects for apartment houses (1929) on the Bülowplatz (now Luxemburgplatz), Berlin with a complex of seven apartment buildings with two hundred apartments and associated furniture; in collaboration with Josip Pičman, he participated in the Bacvice baths project and oversight of Firulo in Split; the famous Babylon theatre/cinema (1929), Berlin; and a casino (1930) for I. G. Farbenindustrie, Frankfurt am Main in collaboration with architect Hans Holzbauer.

== Major award ==
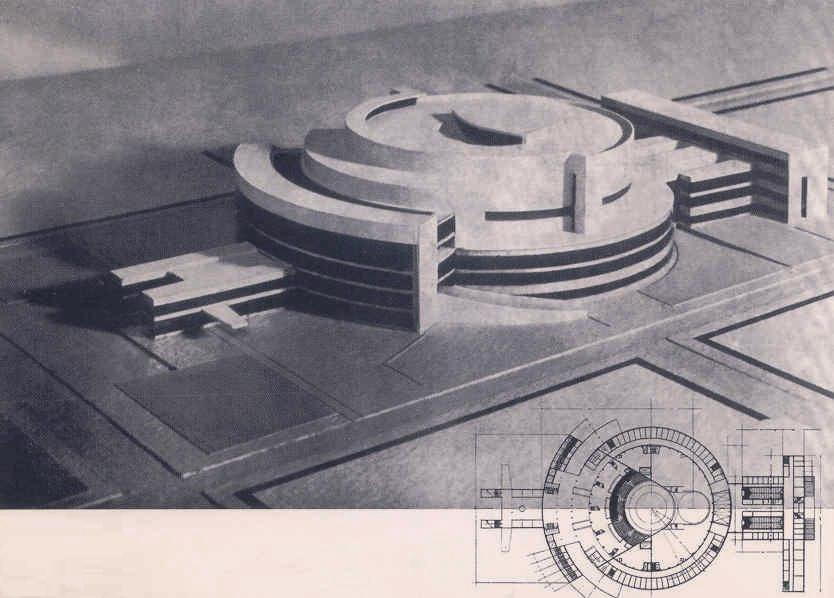
Zdenko Strižić (1930) Maquette for the contest for design of the theatre in Kharkov.

Strižić achieved considerable success by winning his first international award (1930) for the Opera House, Kharkov (now Kharkiv). There were 114 contestants with Poelzig, Le Courbusier, Gropius, brothers Vesnin, Max Taut and Auguste Perret among them. Strižić's project was awarded the first prize, ex aequo with Alfred Karsten and of a group of Russian architects called Kolektiv, bringing international renown for modem Croatian architecture.

Stalin, who was then enforcing Soviet Realism, attacked the project in Pravda for displaying bourgeois tendencies.

Under the influence of modernist trends, in 1930 the city of Zagreb announced an international competition for supervision and tenders for the construction of a Jewish and Foundation Clinical Hospital. The project plan by Strizic was developed in cooperation with Hans Holzbauer in Berlin. From 1931 to 1933 Strižić operated his own practice in Berlin designing, with Franz Xaver Holzbauer (1900–52), several buildings in Austria, Germany, Czech Republic, and Sweden. He was mainly involved in solving urban planning issues, regulation of cities, city quarters, and historical city zones, as well as in designing residential houses in a series of projects including row houses in Zagreb for the First Croatian Savings Bank estate in Trešnjevka, 1935. Strižić was engaged throughout this time in numerous urban-planning competitions (many unexecuted), including for Jelačić Square (1929), Zagreb; and for a beach development.

Imbued with the spirit of modernism, during the 1930s Zdenko Strižić turned to theoretical work, defining the role of architecture in urbanism, and its relation to the social community at large. By then renowned, Strižić, with a group of then-eminent Croatian architects, presented their understanding of local modernity in the book "Problems of Contemporary Architecture". Simultaneous with the book's release, a large exhibition of architecture was opened in the Art Pavilion in Zagreb, where most of the architects who collaborated on the book also exhibited.

At that time, Strižić's multi-storey residential building in Ribnjak was realised. Among his other projects from this period were the Pedagogical Academy in Kassel and the crematorium building in Graz. Although Strižić had been active mainly in Zagreb since 1930, his permanent residence was until 1933 in Berlin.

That year, under pressure from the National Socialist regime, Strizic left Berlin. He worked in Sweden, which was by then exemplary in its application of functional modernism in residential developments. Strizic also drafted a project for a museum building in Malmö.

At the end of the war, in 1946 Strižić was elected to the Faculty of Architecture of the then Technical College of Zagreb as a professor in the department of design (1946–1955), where he worked on the completion of the Susak-Rijeka bridge and the landscaping of its surroundings and design of the Plitvice Lakes National Park with projects for the hotel pavilion, restoration, bathing area and pier on the lake.

== Photographer ==
In 1955 Strižić exhibited a collection of photographs of the traditional architecture of his beloved Zagreb, and published them in a limited-edition book of high-quality reproductions of them, Svjetla i sjene ('Light and Shadows').

== Escape from Yugoslavia ==
In 1955, Strižić escaped illegally from what was then Yugoslavia. A party of Australian architects had travelled through Yugoslavia, and one of them, David Saunders, a senior lecturer in architecture at the University of Melbourne who had stayed with Strizic's parents in 1952 carried a letter from Strižić's son, the photographer Mark Strizic who had been in Melbourne since 1950. The group sent an invitation to him to join the Melbourne faculty of architecture. He arranged to conduct students on a tour of Italy and left the party in charge of a colleague to join his wife in Germany. But despite being forced to leave, his work was uninterrupted. After emigrating, Strižić collaborated in Berlin with Peter Poelzig, son of Hans Poelzig for a time, and at the beginning of 1956 he went to Australia.

== Professor of architecture ==
After fleeing Yugoslavia, Strižić joined the faculty of the University of Melbourne (1956–1961), writing a thesis, collaborating on many publications, and returned to designing. His project for the Australian House of Representatives (1956–1962) was awarded the first prize in a major competition. In the late 1950s, Strizic taught as Bemis Visiting Professor of Architecture at Massachusetts Institute of Technology (MIT) in the United States, and later collaborated with the International Academy of Architecture and Town Planning at the UN. He was invited to Braunschweig in the 1960s to establish a third design department at the university of the time and from 1962 on, he lectured at the High Technical School in Braunschweig. There, Strižić became interested in the current topic of airport architecture and planning, which he followed with some notable studies. In 1968, Strižić's book "Wohnbauten", the third sequel to previous books on architectural design, was published.

In the late 1960s and through the 1970s, Strižić produced notable projects; in 1967, in conjunction with the Schweitzer Atelier, he received the first award for the Brake-Niederweser School Centre, and in 1970 he was awarded the performance of the Kanzelerfeld Centre with over two hundred apartments. He published articles and reviews in the field of architecture and urban planning in, Croatian and foreign journals. He was lecturer and mentor of Vjenceslav Richter, influencing his respect for Bauhaus principles.

Zdenko Strižić died on 1 November 1990 in Braunschweig, where he was buried.

== Publications ==
- Strižić, Zdenko (1947). 'Regulaciona osnova Zadra.' Arhitektura, 1(1-2), 9-12.
- Strizic, Zdenko (1952–56), Arhitektonsko projektiranje, Zagreb
- Strizic, Zdenko (January 1, 1953). Zadatci prostora: Odlomak iz knjige u pripremi: "Arhitektonsko projektovanje, 2. dio - Problemi stanovanja". Arhitekt, 6-11. ('Tasks of Space: An excerpt from a book in preparation: "Architectural Design, Part 2 - Housing Problems."' The Architect, 6-11.)
- Strizic, Zdenko. (1953). Der jugoslawische Nationalpark: die Seen von Plitvice und die touristischen Bauten. W. Jegher & A. Ostertag.
- Strizic, Zdenko (1954) 'Der Architekt und das architektonische Erbe in Jugoslawien,' in Schweizerische Bauzeitung, Vol.: 72 (1954) Issue 15, 1954
- Strizic, Zdenko (1955). Svijetla i sjene. Jedna monografija Zagreba. [Photographs, with text in Serbocroatian, French, English and German. With a map.]. 222 pages. Zagreb
- Strizic, Zdenko (1958), Architectural design: general considerations and housing problems
- Strizic, Zdenko (1965). Architekt und Fotografie. (Place of publication unknown).
- Strizic, Z., & Braunschweig (Germany). (1966). Einfamilienhäuser. Braunschweig: Technische Hochschule.
- Strizic, Zdenko (1975), Schriften, publications, 1935–1975, Braunschweig
- Strižíc, Z., Koschel, R., & Technische Hochschule Carolo-Wilhelmina zu Braunschweig. (1967). Flugempfangsgebäude: Ein Forschungsbericht. Braunschweig: Technische Hochschule.
- Strizic, Z. (1978). Elemente und Ordnungsprinzipien der islamischen Stadtstruktur als konstiuierende Merkmale einer humanen Umwelt: Ein Forschungsbericht. Braunschweig.
- Strižić, Zdenko (1997), O stanovanju: arhitektonsko projektiranje, Nakladništvo udruženja hrvatskih arhitekata, ISBN 978-953-96057-4-0

== Publications about ==
- Premerl, T. (1989.), Hrvatska moderna arhitektura između dva rata. Nakladni zavod Matice hrvatske, Zagreb (Premerl, T. (1989), Croatian Modern Architecture Between the Two Wars. Matica hrvatska Publishing House, Zagreb)
- Gjuro, S., Zdunić, D., Strižić, Z., Dabac, T., Kirin, V., & Petlevski, O. (1990). Stari Zagreb. Zagreb: Nakladni zavod Matice hrvatske.
- Radović Mahečić, D. (1993). Socijalno stanovanje međuratnog Zagreba. Radovi Instituta za povijest umjetnosti, 2(17), 141–155.('Social housing in interwar Zagreb'. Papers of the Institute of Art History)
- Laslo, A. (1995). 'Arhitektura modernog građanskog Zagreba.' Život umjetnosti, 56(57), 58–71. (Laslo, A. (1995). 'Architecture of Modern Civic Zagreb.' Art Life, 56 (57), 58–71.)
- Galović, K. (1997). Architect Zdenko Strižić—Project for the theatre in Harkov (1930). Peristil: zbornik radova za povijest umjetnosti, 40(1), 137–147.
- Lozić, V., Kuzmić, Z., & Strižić, Z. (January 1, 2004). Struktura, obris i sjena: Iz zbirke hrvatska fotografije Fotokluba Zagreb : Zdenko Stržić. Vijenac. ('Structure, outline and shadow: From the collection of Croatian Photography by the Zagreb Photo Club')
- Uchytil, Andrej (2008) Smjernice za studiranje hrvatske arhitekture 20. stoljeća : Arhitekti, II. dopunjeno izdanje. (Guidelines for Studying Croatian Architecture of 20th Century : Architects) Sveučilište u Zagrebu, Arhitektonski fakultet, Zagreb
- Uchytil, Andrej; Barišić Marenić, Zrinka; Kahrović, Emir (2011), Lexicon of architects Atlas of 20th century Croatian Architecture, Sveučilište u Zagrebu, Arhitektonski fakultet = University of Zagreb, Faculty of Architecture, ISBN 978-953-6229-82-6

== Solo exhibitions ==
2004: Zdenko Strižić: Lights and Shadows, Zagreb City Museum, Zagreb, Croatia
