= Marion Borgelt =

Australian artist (born 1954)

- Born: 1954 (age 71–72); Nhill, Australia
- Education: South Australian School of Arts, New York Studio School, French Government Art Fellowship and Residency
- Known for: Abstract painting, sculpture & public art installation

Marion Borgelt (born 1954) is a contemporary Australian artist based in Sydney. Borgelt originally trained as a painter and now her practice encompasses painting, installation, sculpture and mixed media. With a career spanning over 40 years, she has held more than 50 solo exhibitions and participated in over 180 group shows globally. Borgelt's work is currently held in public collections including the National Gallery of Australia and Sydney's Museum of Contemporary Art, and in international museums such as Los Angeles County Museum of Art, USA and New Zealand's Auckland Art Gallery Toi o Tāmaki.

Borgelt has been awarded global commissions including by Baker McKenzie for their Sydney offices in Barangaroo and AMP Capital at 123 Pitt Street, Sydney, and by Melco Crown Resorts, Macau, for their Morpheus (hotel) design by Zaha Hadid Architects.

Her work is held in private collections across the United States of America, France, Canada, Ireland, Australia, New Zealand, Korea, Singapore, Malaysia, Brunei, Dubai, Morocco, United Kingdom, Germany, Myanmar, China and Mexico.

Borgelt is the recipient of international art awards and residencies including a French Government Art Fellowship and Residency (1989) and the Muswellbrook Art Prize (2020). Borgelt has won the Peter Brown Memorial Travelling Art Scholarship, the Dyson Bequest for work and research in Paris and an Australia Council Creative Arts Fellowship. In 1996 she became the first Australian to win the Pollock-Krasner Foundation Award.

== Early life ==
Borgelt was raised on a farm near Nhill, in the Wimmera district of Victoria. Between 1973 and 1976 she undertook a Diploma of Fine Art at the South Australian School of Arts before completing a Graduate Diploma of Secondary Art Teaching at Torrens University Australia in Adelaide in 1977. Borgelt left Australia for the New York Studio School in 1979.

In the 1980s, Borgelt taught at the Canberra School of Art and the UNSW School of Art & Design. She was a guest lecturer at University of Newcastle, Macquarie University, Campbelltown City Bicentennial Arts Centre and the Ivan Dougherty Gallery at the University of New South Wales.

== Artistic practice ==
Interested in the cosmos, language and phenomenology, Borgelt has discussed maths, science and physics as paths to better understanding the universe and explores these disciplines in her art. Her investigation of these influences through diverse mediums, has led to collaborations with René Tazé etching atelier in Paris (1990), with printer Fred Genis (1995), with Fondazione Berengo Studio in Murano, Italy (2006–2007) and with Tilt Mechanical Engineers (2020–2021).

== Career ==
=== 1980s ===
The natural landscape that surrounded Borgelt during her rural upbringing inspired her early work. Anna Voigt wrote concerning Borgelt's art practice that, "The journey of the spirit and of artmaking are inseparable realities for Marion Borgelt". Borgelt's childhood in rural Australia remains integral to her art practice. As for the landscape itself, she "was always both impressed and haunted by the vast flat open space of the Wimmera. In summer it felt like we lived under the sun. It was hot and dusty, wheat fields shimmering as far as the eye could see. It is a place where the earth meets the sky with nothing much in between. There were, of course, the wonderful vernacular structures of the wheat silos, which dotted the horizon. I called them 'The Cathedrals of the Wimmera'. When I was about seventeen, I was desperate to leave.” In an interview with Candida Baker for The Australian Weekend Magazine (1999) Borgelt commented that the landscape gave her an understanding of nature as a rich source of material, and was intrigued by its cyclical patterns. This interest in natural cycles is demonstrated in Fire, Wind and Water No. 1. Natural details and a focus on the minute also emerged in her works as seen in Athenian Netherworld and the Night Eye, the subject matter of which has been compared to woven skin cells or webs. In 1988 Borgelt was one of 22 artists selected from 450 entrants to participate in the Moet & Chandon Young Painters Tour. Borgelt began exhibiting at Roslyn Oxley9 Gallery in 1982. In the same year, her art was included in the 4th Biennale of Sydney Vision in Disbelief, and in 1985 her work was shown in the Australian Perspecta Biennale. In 1986 she was invited to represent Australia at the 6th Indian Triennale, alongside Jenny Watson (artist).

=== 1990s ===
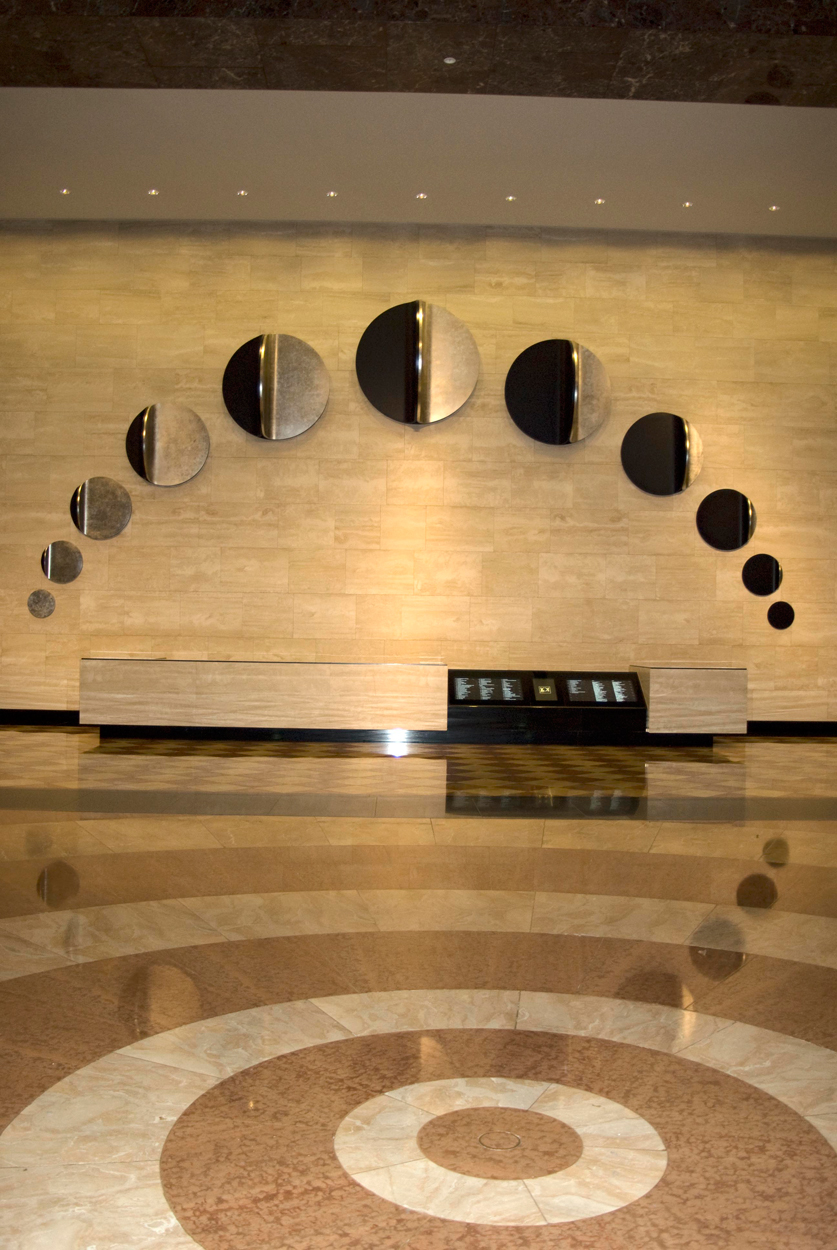
Candescent Moon, Marion Borgelt, 2011

In 1989 Borgelt was awarded the French Government Art Fellowship and Residency to develop her practice in Paris, where she remained for eight years. Paris was the catalyst for a shift in Borgelt's artistic approach, where previously her gestural abstract works were intuitive, the intellectual setting of Paris, abundant with artistic and academic resources, encouraged her practice to become refined with a planned approach. In an interview with Betsy Brennan for Vogue Living Australia, Borgelt explained that “Paris with its historical and complex psychological layering has caused me to open up a range of doors...find a stasis, or centre of my own”. This refinement is illustrated in her Void series and Mnemona Suite, 1994–1995. Borgelt's fascination with the cosmos seeped into her work such as her Blood Light series (1995–2005) which reflects this interest in depicting the macrocosm and the microcosm. In Paris Borgelt also developed her own lexicon of symbolic language related to the primordial, exploring the qualities of symbols and their ability to evoke ancient memory with their enduring communicative powers. The suite of symbols featured in her Primordial Series was influenced by Celtic art forms, the Kabbalah belief system and Buddhism and Hinduism. Her visual explorations of this notion are reflected in the works such as Primordial Logic and Primordial One: Figures F, B, E, A. In her work Anima/Animus: Splitting Into One No. III, there is a reference to a Jungian theory of the archetypes. Noticeable in these works is the presence of the circle shape, which often occurs in Borgelt's oeuvre. While various shapes have different significance for Borgelt, the circle, as she states," [...] embraces to me the most, and the oval too to a certain degree, but the circle seems to represent to me 'totality.' Because the circle is [...] a contained thing without [...] any tension.". This symbolic language continued in her series Bottled Histories where timber panels were painted and layered with bees wax before being paired with collected vessels. Symbols painted onto both vessel and panel cross-referenced each other, exploring a recontextualization of the objects. Borgelt's French palette mainly featured blacks, reds and whites. Victoria Lynn notes of Borgelt's work that, "Energy in her paintings can be as soft as a feather or as turbulent as and fierce as a violent storm."

In 1998 Borgelt was commissioned by News Corp Australia to develop a large-scale site-specific installation for their Sydney corporate headquarters. This commission brought Borgelt back to Australia. Primordial Alphabet and Rhythm was installed as a 15m high work that comprises 12 large painted panels and 10 low relief sculptural discs. Collectively, the work represents the flow of communication, waves and energy. In 1999 Borgelt was commissioned to complete her first large-scale outdoor work, 55 Ring Maze, which encompassed 1.5 hectares, at Arthurs Seat, Victoria. The maze, an interactive work, combined art and nature reflecting Borgelt's interest in living art and ancient patterning.

=== 2000s ===
During the 2000s Borgelt's work developed breadth through experimentation with new mediums and forms, including a shift into sculpture. This can be seen in Borgelt's 2004 suite, Cryptologist's Memoir, where she carved into the pages of books and moulded wax into the hollows, creating embedded symbols. These works have been likened to ancient tomes. A theme of dualities emerged in Borgelt's work which, as highlighted by journalist Paul McGillick for Art & Australia, considered tensions between “our biological and emotional natures, the body and the spirit, our everyday consciousness and the powerful sense that there are worlds beyond this one, our sense of adventure and our fears, the senses and the mind”.

Borgelt drew upon her early interest in natural cycles by depicting the passage of time, using examples such as lunar sequences, as a means to explore these all-encompassing forces. In 2004 Borgelt was commissioned by JPMorgan Chase to create a work for the 32nd floor of their offices at the Harry Seidler building overlooking Circular Quay. Her 4000 kg work Time and Tide (wait for no man) arranged sculptural elements in a spiral form, depicting phases of the lunar cycle, suggesting that corporate life is governed by a global clock. In 2005 Borgelt was commissioned to complete her second large-scale outdoor maze. Returning to memories from her rural childhood, and inspired by photographer Peter Leaver's image of approximately 2000 sheep being mustered on Mungadal Station near Hay in Victoria, Borgelt designed Round Up Maze. In the same year she was invited to join the judging panel for the Blake Prize, and would again be invited in 2018.

During these years her paintings are said to have challenged the flat canvas form, particularly in her Liquid Light suite, which established three-dimensional qualities that dynamically produced movement. For these works, Borgelt painted her canvases on both sides, then sliced the canvases, precisely twisting and pinning them to reveal the inner layer. This technique introduced a new relationship between the viewer and artwork; whereby the work would ripple in motion, revealing itself differently as the viewer changed position. The origins of this method could be ascribed to Lucio Fontana, though the kinetic effect of Borgelt's twists add a hypnotic dimension. This suite led to a 4.5m triptych commissioned by the Sule Shangri-La Hotel in Myanmar and an additional suite for Crown Towers at City of Dreams (casino) in Macau. In 2005 Borgelt created commemorative installation Man's Destiny Resides in the Sole for Bata Shoe Museum in Toronto.

In 2006, for her exhibition Nothing is Invisible at Christine Abrahams Gallery, Borgelt interpreted her journey from her childhood home to the expansive world she's come to experience. Regarding influences for this suite, Borgelt recalled in an interview with Harbant Gill for the Herald Sun, “One of my strongest senses of where I was in time and space was in relation to the horizon line and the night sky.” Also in 2006 Borgelt further explored lunar cycles in a collaboration with Fondazione Berengo Studio glass Murano, Italy.

In 2008 Borgelt expanded the optic qualities of her work in her Strobe Series which rendered hand-painted lines of colour together with deliberately incorporated curves that created an optical illusion that has been compared to a seismograph. Paintings from this series were featured in an installation for the Mirvac offices on 101 Miller Street North Sydney.

=== 2010s ===
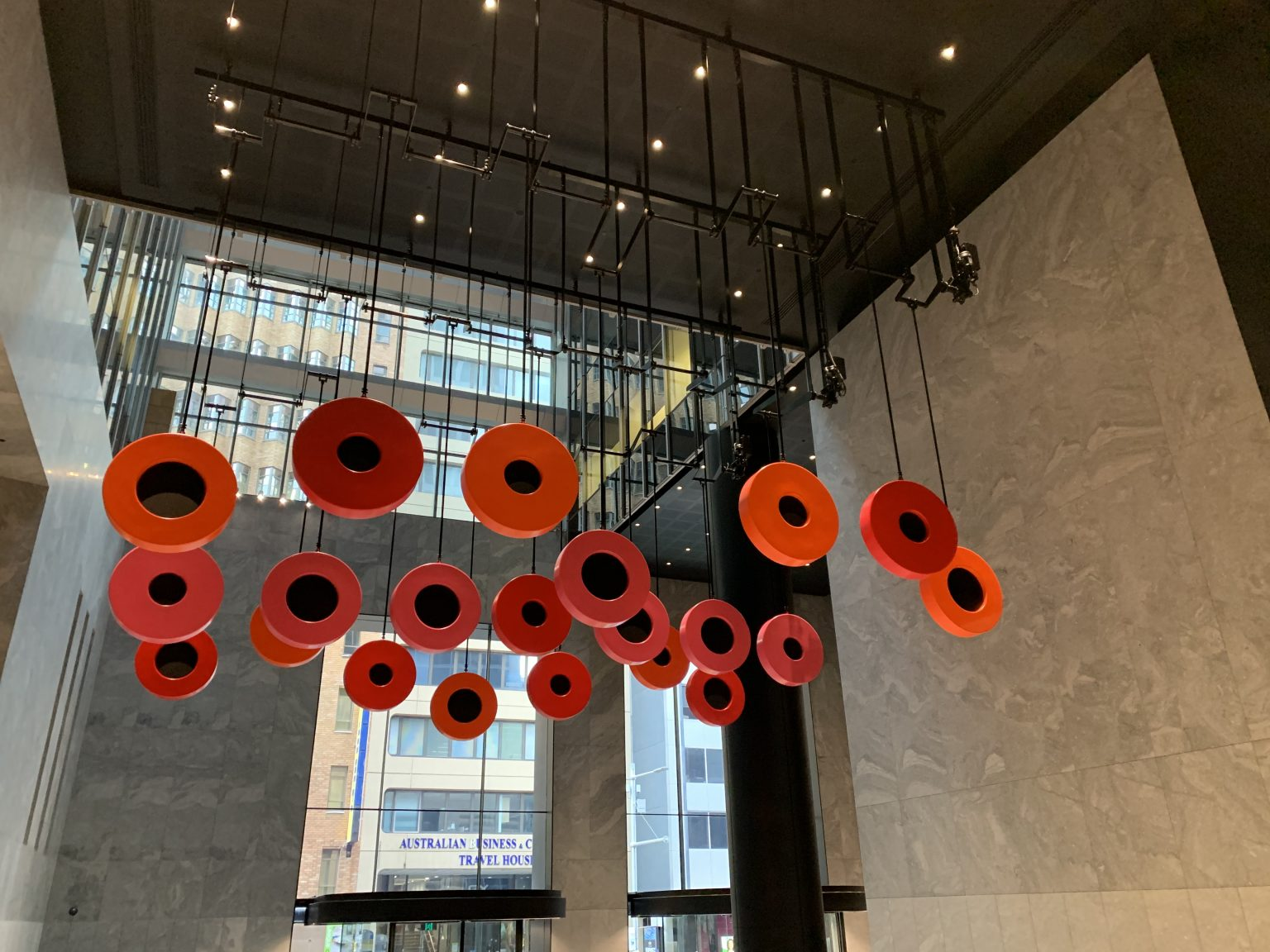
Musical Spheres, Marion Borgelt, 2020

In 2010 a 15-year retrospective of Borgelt's work, Mind and Matter, was held at Drill Hall Gallery at the Australian National University in Canberra. Her diverse use of mediums and documentation of large-scale commission works illustrated her ongoing investigation of optics, structures and natural elements. In 2011 she was commissioned by Bates Smart to create Candescent Moon, a large-scale work of a lunar cycle for 101 Collins Street, Melbourne. An optical illusion plays with the eye when moving from one side to the other, encouraging interactivity with the work. In 2016 a 20-year survey, Marion Borgelt: Memory & Symbol, was held at the Newcastle Art Gallery. These works, spanning from 1993 to 2016, prompted recognition of the invention, consistency and versatility in Borgelt's practice. In 2017 Borgelt was commissioned to create a kinetic work that spans a three-storey atrium for Baker McKenzie at Tower One, Barangaroo, New South Wales. The motorised work, Cascadence, alludes to the notion of descending droplets as coloured elements rotate. In 2018 Borgelt was commissioned by Melco Crown Resorts in Macau to create a suite of large digital face-mounted photographs for 52 lift lobbies of the Morpheus (hotel), design by Zaha Hadid Architects.

=== 2020s ===
In 2020 AMP Capital commissioned Borgelt to create Musical Spheres to be situated within the music precinct of Angel Place, on Pitt Street Sydney. This kinetic work uses crankshaft mechanics to gradually move the large coloured discs in a motion akin to hammers gently hitting piano strings. Music is an enduring inspiration for Borgelt's practice. In her exhibition Silent Symphony at Gallery Sally Dan-Cuthbert in Sydney, Borgelt's geometric works such as Florette No. 3 were considered, by art critic John McDonald, to possess the hypnotic attraction of a mandala.

== Awards ==
Borgelt has been the recipient of awards including:

- 2020: Muswellbrook Art Prize
- 2006: Visual Arts Board, New Work Grant
- 2001–2003: Australia Council Fellowship
- 2002: Judges Award, Hutchins Art Prize
- 2001: Australian Paper Art Awards (acquisitive)
- 1998: Blake Prize, Highly Commended
- 1997: Visual Arts/Craft Board, New Work Grant
- 1996: Pollock-Krasner Foundation Award, USA
- 1996: Gunnery Studios Residency, New South Wales Ministry of the Arts
- 1994: Artist Grant, La Ministère de la Culture et de la Francophonie, France
- 1994: Kedumba Drawing Award (joint acquisition)
- 1993: Visual Arts/Crafts Board, Artist Development Grant
- 1992: Fisher’s Ghost Art Award, Campbelltown City Bicentennial Art Gallery (acquisitive)
- 1990: Fisher’s Ghost Art Award, Campbelltown City Bicentennial Art Gallery (joint acquisition)
- 1989: Dyason Bequest
- 1988: University of Technology Purchase Award, Sydney
- 1988: Muswellbrook Open Prize (acquisitive)
- 1988: Faber-Castell Art Award
- 1988: Visual Arts/Craft Board, Artist Development Grant
- 1988: French Government Art Fellowship and Residency
- 1987: Gold Coast City Art Gallery Purchase Prize
- 1986: The City of Lake Macquarie Art Prize (acquisitive)
- 1986: Sixth Ansett Hamilton Art Award (acquisitive)
- 1984: Visual Arts Board, Special Projects Grant
- 1983: Muswellbrook Drawing Prize (acquisitive)
- 1979: Dyason Bequest for Post Graduate Study in the United States of America
- 1978: Peter Brown Memorial Travelling Art Scholarship, New York Studio School, New York
- 1976: Harry P. Gill, Memorial Medal for Applied Art, South Australian School of Art, Adelaide
- 1975: Channel 10 Young Artist's Award, South Australia

== Public collections ==
Borgelt's work is held in public collections including:

Gallery	Location
Art Gallery of New South Wales	Sydney, Australia
Art Gallery of South Australia	Adelaide, Australia
Art Gallery of Western Australia	Perth, Australia
Museum of Contemporary Art Australia	Sydney, Australia
National Gallery of Australia	Canberra, Australia
National Gallery of Victoria	Melbourne, Australia
Auckland Museum of Contemporary Art	Auckland, New Zealand
Auckland Art Gallery Toi o Tāmaki	Auckland, New Zealand
Limerick City Gallery of Art	Limerick, Ireland
Los Angeles County Museum of Art	Los Angeles, United States of America
Queensland Art Gallery	Brisbane, Australia
Artbank Australia	Sydney, Australia
Artspace Mackay	Mackay, Australia
Casula Powerhouse Arts Centre	Casula, Australia
Parliament House Collection	Canberra, Australia
Powerhouse Museum	Sydney, Australia
Art Gallery of Ballarat	Ballarat, Australia
Bendigo Art Gallery	Bendigo, Australia
Maitland Regional Art Gallery	Maitland, Australia
Muswellbrook Arts Centre	Muswellbrook, Australia
Newcastle Regional Art Gallery	Newcastle, Australia
Bata Shoe Museum	Toronto, Canada
Gravity Discovery Centre Foundation	Perth, Australia

== Selected publications ==
Borgelt’s work has been featured in publications and textbooks including:

Title	Author	Publisher	Year
The Land and its Psyche	Julian Beaumont, Felicity Fenner, John McDonald	Macquarie Group and New South Publishing	2012
Studio: Australian Painters on the Question of Creativity	John McDonald, R. Ian Lloyd	R. Ian Lloyd Productions	2007
The New McCulloch’s Encyclopedia of Australian Art	Alan McCulloch, Susan McCulloch, Emily Childs	Miegunyah Press	2006
BORGELT	Felicity Fenner, Candice Bruce	21C Publications	2000
Marion Borgelt. Art & Australia	Victoria Lynn	Craftsman House	1997
Artwise Contemporary 2	Glenis Israel	Jacaranda Plus, John Wiley & Sons	2008
Senior Artwise	Glenis Israel	Jacaranda Press	1999

== See also ==
- Art of Australia
