= Judith Buckrich =

Australian writer

- Born: 1950 (age 75–76); Budapest, Hungary
- Occupation: Author
- Notable work: The Village of Ripponlea, Acland Street: the Grand Lady of St Kilda

Dr Judith Buckrich (born 1950, Budapest, Hungary) is a Melbourne author and past chair of the International PEN Women Writers' Committee.

== Life ==
She emigrated to Australia with her parents in 1958. She has returned to Hungary several times and was working for the English-language Daily News during the 1989 velvet revolution. She is a consulting fellow of the World Innovation Foundation. She is a former President of the PMI Victorian History Library, serving from 2018 until 2020.

== Work ==
She has several entries in the Encyclopedia of Melbourne, including those on Collins Street and St Kilda Road, and was an image researcher for the project. In her other writing life, she has written her own one-woman shows, short stories, feature articles. She has taught writing at Deakin University. Her most recent work is The World is One Kilometre: Greville Street, Prahran (2019).

She regularly speaks about her work on television and radio and has given talks at the National Gallery of Victoria, Royal Historical Society of Victoria and for many other organizations.

Her publishing house, Lauranton Books, has published three books, including the award winning 'The Village of Ripponlea'. In 2018 Lauranton Books will publish 'The Heart's Ground: A Life of Anne Elder' by Julia Hamer and an anthology of Anne Elder's poems, 'The Bright and the Cold'.

As of 2022, she was working on two histories, of the Victorian Pride Centre in St Kilda, Victoria, and of the Yarra River.

== Awards and honours ==
In 2016, she won a Victorian Community History Award for her book The Village of Ripponlea published in 2015 and, in 2018, a Fellowship of Australian Writers (Victoria) Award for non-fiction for 'Acland Street: the Grand Lady of St Kilda' published in 2017.

== List of published works ==
- Sussex, L; J R Buckrich (1995). She's fantastical. Melbourne: Sybylla. ISBN 978-0-908205-12-7. OCLC 33952457.
- Buckrich, J R; A Birkenbeil (1996). Melbourne's grand boulevard: The Story of St. Kilda Road. Melbourne, Victoria: State Library of Victoria. ISBN 978-0-7306-7959-2. OCLC 38294812.
- Buckrich, J R (1998). The Montefiore Homes: 150 years of care. Carlton South, Victoria: Melbourne University Press. ISBN 978-0-522-84845-8. OCLC 40271134.
- Buckrich, J R (1999). George Turner: a life. Carlton South, Victoria: Melbourne University Press. ISBN 978-0-522-84840-3. OCLC 54857993.
- Buckrich, J R (2002). The long and perilous journey: a history of the Port of Melbourne. Melbourne: Melbourne Books. ISBN 978-1-877096-00-6. OCLC 45122769.
- Buckrich, J R (2004). Lighthouse on the boulevard: a history of the Royal Victorian Institute for the Blind. Melbourne: Australian Scholarly Publishing. ISBN 1-74097-070-5.
- Buckrich, J R; K Dunstan; R Storey; M Strizic (2005). Collins: Australia's premier street. Melbourne: Arcadia/Australian Scholarly Publishing for the Collins Street Precinct. ISBN 978-1-74097-057-0. OCLC 71293123.
- Buckrich, J R (2007). Design for living: a history of 'Prahran Tech'. Windsor, Victoria: Prahran Mechanics' Institute Press. ISBN 978-0-9756000-8-5.
- Buckrich, Judith (2009). Well rowed university: Melbourne University Boat Club: the first 150 Years. Melbourne: Melbourne University Boat Club. ISBN 9780646510736.
- Buckrich, Judith (2015). The making of us: Rusden drama, media and dance 1966-2002. Gardenvale, Victoria: Lauranton Books. ISBN 9780994250704.
- Buckrich, Judith (2015). The village of Ripponlea. Gardenvale, Victoria: Lauranton Books. ISBN 9780994250711.
- Buckrich, Judith (2016). The political is personal: a 20th century memoir. Gardenvale, Victoria: Lauranton Books. ISBN 9780994250728.
- Buckrich, Judith (2017). Acland Street: the grand lady of St Kilda. St Kilda, Victoria: Australian Teachers of Media (ATOM). ISBN 9781760610661.
- Buckrich, Judith (2019). The world is one kilometre: Greville Street, Prahran. Windsor, Victoria: Prahran Mechanics' Institute Press. ISBN 9780980453683.
- Buckrich, Judith (2020). Upstream, against the current: the story of women's rowing in Australia. Gardenvale, Victoria: Lauranton Books for Rowing Australia. ISBN 9780994250759.

== Sources ==
- Webb, Carolyn (20 October 2005). "Recalling an era to see and be seen". The Age (Australia).
