= Denise Green =

Australian artist (born 1946)

Denise Green AM (born 1946) is an Australian painter living and working in New York City. She is known for her contributions to New Image Painting, an ambiguous art movement that began in the late 1970s. Her paintings are typically abstract and present an idea rather than a formal representation of a subject. Her work is both analytic in structure and intuitive in colour and gesture.

== Early life and education ==
Denise Green was born in Australia in 1946 and grew up in Brisbane. During her early years in Brisbane, she developed a strong interest in Aboriginal art. The work created by these indigenous artists continued to serve as inspiration throughout her extensive career.

Green left Australia in 1966 to live and study in Europe, where she married her first husband, Bruce Wolmer, and developed a taste for abstract art. She studied in Paris at the College de France but dropped out, the Ecole Nationale des Beaux Arts Supérieure but did not finish, and the Sorbonne, as well did not finish. Her brief architectural studies at the Ecole Nationale des Beaux Arts Supérieure continued to serve as an influence on her earlier works even after she relocated to New York City. After living in Paris for three years, Green left Europe to attend graduate school at Hunter College in New York. There, she met Mark Rothko and Robert Motherwell who became her teachers and mentors, introducing her to the artistic movements of abstract expressionism, minimalism, and conceptual art. Under their instruction, she developed a foundation in Western modernism.

In the 1970s, Green spent time traveling in India. Her travels throughout the East to countries including India, Burma, Japan, and Indonesia were motivated by her visit to Kuringai Chase in the artist's native Australia, a sacred site to Australian Aboriginals. This exposure to non-Western art influenced the artist's oeuvre and served as a catalyst for her ongoing interest in combining Eastern and Western thinking in her work, a topic that she discusses at length in her book Metonymy in Art: a New Paradigm.

In 2007, Green was made a Member of the Order of Australia, one of the highest recognitions of achievement and service for Australian citizens.

== Work ==
Green was first recognized for her paintings at the Whitney Museum of American Art's exhibition New Image Painting in 1978. Her work is included in major museum collections, including the Solomon R. Guggenheim Museum and the Museum of Modern Art in New York and the Hirshhorn Museum and Sculpture Garden in Washington, D.C. The Solomon R. Guggenheim Museum has two of Greens paintings in their permanent collection, To Draw On (1977) and Taxes (1993). To Draw On (1977) was included in the Solomon R. Guggenheim Museum's 1987 exhibition, Emerging Artists 1978-1986: Selections From the Exxon Series and is an example of the artist's contribution to New Image Painting.

Green's earlier works are predominantly cityscapes, such as Laight St., View No. 1 (1975). The paintings that she made during her first years in New York often focused on the architecture of building facades, evidently inspired by her architectural studies in Paris in the 1960s. During the mid- to late-1970s, her work became more abstracted as her focus shifted to the portrayal of centralized objects isolated in space. In the 1980s, her work became even more abstracted with works like Summer Heat (1981). With this work she introduces the use of ambiguous, calligraphic marks that allude to written language. During this period of her oeuvre, Green emphasized strong colours and basic forms, like circles and fan shapes.

The early 1990s marked another shift in her style with an exhibition in Sydney, Australia in 1992 at Roslyn Okley9 Gallery. Here, she exhibited eight large canvases that were predominately black and white. These works, including Cinderella What? (1992) and Snow White? (1992), provided a drastic contrast to Green's previous, colour-dominated works. The artist describes this series of black and white paintings as a response to her father's death. These works in particular illuminate the connection that the artist draws between all of her work and her own personal narrative.

In 2013, Green and her husband, Dr. Francis X. Claps, donated a gift of 80 works on paper and 36 paintings by Green valued at more than one million Australian dollars to the University of Queensland Art Museum.

Since the beginning of her career, Green has had more than 130 one-person shows and her work has been shown in nine museum retrospectives since 1999, including venues at MoMA PS1, New York and the Art Gallery of New South Wales, Sydney. The artist continues to paint, take photographs, and make collages and works on paper today.

== Works ==
Green is the author of two books: Metonymy in Art: a New Paradigm, published by the University of Minnesota Press and Macmillan Art Publishers (Australia) in 2005, and An Artist's Odyssey, released by the same publishers in 2012.
