= Barbie Kjar =

Australian artist and educator

Barbie Kjar (/kɛər/) (born 1957) is an Australian artist and educator, specialising in printmaking and drawing. Her work is included in the permanent collections of the National Gallery of Australia, the National Gallery of Victoria, Tasmanian Museum and Art Gallery, and the Gold Coast City Art Gallery.

== Early life and education ==
Kjar is of Danish heritage on her father's side and Cornish, with Spanish links, on her mother's side. She was born in Burnie, Tasmania and moved to Hobart at the age of 16. As a teen she learned drawing from the Tasmanian portraitist Alan Lester McIntyre.

Kjar completed a Bachelor of Fine Arts and Education at the University of Tasmania, Hobart in 1987 and a Masters of Fine Art at RMIT, Melbourne in 2000.

== Art practice ==
Kjar's work is concerned with portraiture, identity, belonging, and narrative. She draws from live models but often brings in iconography from historical narratives or ancient mythology such as the story of Odysseus's journey in Homer's The Odyssey. She says, "I'm interested in narratives. People have lots of stories rumbling around inside them; that sense of history or narrative, having layers, that makes up each person." Her work has been inspired by writers from Homer to Herman Melville, Jorge Luis Borges and Emily Dickinson. Like these writers Kjar's imagery is rarely literal. The four elements of air, fire, water and earth, as well as birds and other animals, have been major themes in her work.

Kjar has developed a signature style during her prolific career as an artist. It relies on one well-placed, clean line. Art curator Caroline Field summarises Kjar's work when she says, "It has a spiritual calm and meditative quality. I hope it will just stop people for a moment of reflection whether it’s deeply spiritual or whether it’s just to pause and contemplate. It doesn’t refer to one particular faith, but it speaks to the inner core, to your inner spiritual being."

In 2000 Kjar was invited by Annie Greig, the director of Tas Dance, to draw the dancers in rehearsal for Cumulus, choreographed by Chrissie Parrott. The drawings were developed into prints and exhibited at Dick Bett Gallery in Hobart. In 2009 Kjar collaborated with Melbourne-based dance company Chunky Move. She drew the dancers as they rehearsed for their performance Mortal Engine, choreographed by Gideon Obarzanek. The drawings were developed into prints and exhibited at Australian Galleries.

== Work and exhibitions ==
Since 1986 Kjar has held thirty-six solo exhibitions in Australia at a range of galleries including Australian Galleries, Melbourne, Bett Gallery, Hobart, and Beaver Galleries, Canberra. Internationally she has exhibited in the UK, China, Korea, Siberia, France, Canada, USA and Japan.

== Awards and recognition ==
Kjar's work has been included in many award exhibitions and she has been the recipient of numerous awards including the Trust Bank Art Award in 1992, the Conrad Jupiters Art Prize in 1999, the Bay Of Fires Art Prize in 2015, the James Northfield scholarship for lithography at Australian Print Workshop in 2019 and she received Tasmanian Arts Board Grants in 1988, 1991 and 2004. She has also received several Australia Council grants.

== Residencies ==
Kjar has undertaken residencies in Spain and at Draw International in Caylus, France, as well as in Rome, Barcelona, Havana, San Francisco, Mexico City, and Tokyo.

== Collections ==
Kjar’s work has been purchased for the collections of the Australian National Gallery, Canberra; Artbank, Sydney; Parliament House, Canberra; Wagga Wagga Gallery, Wagga Wagga; National Gallery of Victoria, Melbourne; Tasmanian Museum and Art Gallery, Hobart; Fremantle Arts Centre, Fremantle; Grafton Regional Gallery, Grafton; Queensland University of Technology, Brisbane; Gold Coast City Art Gallery, Gold Coast; University of Southern Queensland, Toowoomba, and is held in private collections in USA, France, Sweden, England and Australia.

== Teaching ==
Alongside her career as an artist, Kjar teaches printmaking and drawing. Her areas of expertise include wood lithography (mokulito), drypoint, carborundum and drawing. She has taught masterclasses in printmaking at Baldessin Press, Melbourne, The Art Vault, Mildura, Umbrella Studios, Townsville, InkMasters, Cairns. She has also taught printmaking and drawing classes at Sturt University, Barkly Regional Art Centre, Tennant Creek, the University of Tasmania, Hobart, Hunter Island Press, Hobart, National Art School, Sydney, Canberra School of Art, Canberra, the Victorian College of the Arts, University of Melbourne, Melbourne and the MacGregor School of Art, Toowoomba. Kjar has also taught art as part of an English as a Second Language program through VicSeg.
