= Jeremy Barrett (artist) =

Australian artist

- Born: 8 September 1936 (age 89); Melbourne, Victoria, Australia
- Known for: Painting
- Website: jeremybarrett.com.au

Jeremy Barrett (born 1936) is an Australian artist.

His work is in the collection of the National Gallery of Victoria.

== Notable exhibitions ==
- "Jeremy Barrett: Survey Exhibition", solo show, 4 July - 23 August 2015, Castlemaine Art Gallery & Historical Museum, Castlemaine, Victoria, Australia
