= Gold Coast City Art Gallery =

Art museum in Surfers Paradise, Gold Coast, Queensland

Coordinates: 28°00′04.6″S 153°24′58.93″E

The Gold Coast City Art Gallery was a regional Art museum located in Surfers Paradise on the Gold Coast in Queensland, Australia. Opened in 1986, the Gallery was part of HOTA, Home of the Arts (formerly known as the Gold Coast Art Centre) which is funded by the Gold Coast City Council. After 33 years, the Gold Coast City Art Gallery closed in 2018 to prepare for the opening of the new $60.5m HOTA gallery in early 2021.

== City Collection ==
The Gallery was the home of the renowned City Collection of contemporary and historical artworks documenting the character of the Gold Coast as well as the development of contemporary Australian Art practice. In 2021 the City Collection will move to its new home in the new HOTA Gallery.

== Art Prizes ==
The Gallery was also home to one of Australia's longest running art prizes, the Drs Stan and Maureen Duke Gold Coast Art Prize which is an acquisitive art award and exhibition of contemporary Australian Art. This Prize began its life in 1968 with the inaugural Gold Coast Art Prize. The prize was established with the intention of bringing the latest in contemporary art practice to what was then a relatively small tourism-based community. From 1990 to 2006 it was known as the Conrad Jupiters Art Prize and many significant works were acquired during this time including the first public gallery acquisitions of works by Adam Cullen and Guan Wei. The prize now enters a new era with the support of the Stan and Maureen Duke Foundation. The support through the Foundation has allowed for a significant increase in the overall value of the prize. The collection has benefited greatly from gifts of art from Barbara and Patrick Corrigan, and Elizabeth and Colin Laverty.

The Gallery was also the home of the Josephine Ulrick and Win Schubert Photography Award. An initiative of the Josephine Ulrick and Win Schubert Foundation, the award honours the philanthropy of Win Schubert AO (1937-2017) and her extraordinary generosity as a lifelong custodian of Australian photography, art and creativity. It is now also the biggest award in photography for Queensland and second in Australia, acting as a touchstone for contemporary photographic practice nationwide.

== Exhibitions and events ==
When open the Gallery presented a diverse and dynamic program of exhibitions and events. These included local, national and international exhibitions. The exhibitions and events were both generated by the Gallery and those displayed as part of touring schedule.

The Gallery is also home to the riverside Sculpture Walk, an exhibition that provides a walk through a range of outdoor sculptures. These sculptures include permanent and semi-permanent sculptures by Australian and international artists. The Sculpture Walk is set against the backdrop of the high-rise Gold Coast skyline.
