= List of Archibald Prize 2026 finalists =

This is a list of finalists for the 2026 Archibald Prize for portraiture (listed as Artist – Title). Of the 1,034 entries received for the Archibald Prize, 59 artworks were selected as finalists. As the images are copyrighted, a link to each image is available through the reference.

The winner was announced on 8 May 2026.

An exhibition of Archibald, Wynne and Sulman artworks will tour to Shepparton Art Museum and Bank Art Museum Moree in 2026 and the Griffith Regional Art Gallery, Bathurst Regional Art Gallery, Penrith Regional Gallery and Tweed Regional Gallery and Margaret Olley Art Centre in 2027.

- Mostafa Azimitabar – Jim Moginie
- Elizabeth Barden – Sid
- Drew Bickford – RackaRacka (attack!)
- Natasha Bieniek – Self-portrait
- Mia Boe – Drifting cloud
- Mitch Cairns – Gerald Murnane
- Taryn Cameron-Smith – Nanakorobi yaoki ('Fall down seven times, get up eight')
- Tom Carment – Self-portrait at 71
- Amelia Carroll – Morning class 2
- Nick Collerson – Mick Turner
- Andrew Collis – AKA Sopha Dopha
- Desiree Crossing – An ordinary man
- David Darcy – To whom: let’s be Frank, it's no walk in the park
- Amanda Davies – Marta
- Julia Dover – My friend
- Betina Fauvel-Ogden – Pride
- Robert Fielding – Tjintir-Tjintir
- Juan Ford – Portrait of Chloé Hayden
- Stephanie Galloway Brown – Layne Beachley AO
- Tsering Hannaford – Portrait of Loribelle Spirovski (after Dürer)
- Daniel Kim – Lesleigh 'Alémais'
- Sean Lahy – The tragicall historie of Hamlet, Prince of Denmarke (Winner: Packing Room Prize 2026)
- Richard Lewer – Iluwanti Ken (Winner: Archibald Prize 2026)
- Guy McEwan – More than words
- Guido (Guy) Maestri – Self-portrait, inside out (head in the clouds)
- Kelly Maree – Cody Simpson
- Andy Miller – Portrait of Dorcas Maphakela
- Nick Mourtzakis – Jack Wodak, neurologist
- Trésor Murace – Fiona Lowry as the Airbrush Queen
- Vincent Namatjira – The Dust Bowl
- Técha Noble – Anna
- Liam Nunan – The cost of flowers
- Camille Olsen-Ormandy – Portrait of Gemma Chua-Tran
- Meagan Pelham – Dreamland Jessica
- Stieg Persson – Virginia and Cora
- Tom Polo – I still thought you were looking
- James Powditch – Once upon a time in Yarralumla – Her Excellency the Honourable, Sam Mostyn AC, 28th Governor-General of Australia
- Noah Regan – Christophe Domergue, A peeling to the gods
- Dale Rhodes – Susie
- Thom Roberts – George Harrison is turning 50
- Adrian Jangala Robertson – Dylan River
- Anthony Romagnano – Fiona in the studio
- Marikit Santiago – Even doves have pride (collaboration with Maella Santiago, Santi Mateo Santiago and Sarita Santiago)
- Sarah Satha – The angel of Newtown
- Kean Onn See – At the studio of William Yang
- Sindy Sinn – Keep on stingin'
- Loribelle Spirovski – Fingerpainting of Daniel Johns
- Nick Stathopoulos – A brilliant career (Margaret Fink)
- Morgan Stokes – Yvette
- Vicki Sullivan – Peace actually
- Natasha Walsh – The mirage (self-portrait)
- Chris Watts – Mitch Brown
- Peter Wegner – Kindred spirit – Elisabeth Cummings
- Anna Weston – Judy
- Kaylene Whiskey – Dancing with The Huxleys
- Andrea Wilson – Richard Leplastrier AO
- Zoe Young – Phoebe at The Chelsea
- Michael Zavros – Alex with his tefillin in the sea
- Caroline Zilinsky – Two Zimmermans
