= List of Archibald Prize 2016 finalists =

This is a list of finalists for the 2016 Archibald Prize for portraiture. As the images are copyrighted, an external link to an image has been listed where available (listed is Artist – Title).

- Abdul Abdullah – The cost (Portrait of Craig Campbell)
- Clara Adolphs – Terry Serio
- Benjamin Aitken – Portrait of mentor (Jon Cattapan and self)
- Tony Albert – Tony Albert (after Brownie Downing) (Self-portrait)
- Danelle Bergstrom – Guy Warren
- Kate Beynon – Claudia, Spartacus and the robots
- Natasha Bieniek – Wendy Whiteley
- Chris Bond – The restless dead (portrait of the artist) (Self-portrait)
- Dean Brown – McLean Edwards
- Chris Browne – Krista Brennan
- Daniel Butterworth – Annie Smithers
- Yvette Coppersmith – Rose Burn self-portrait
- Lucy Culliton – Lucy and fans (Self-portrait)
- Sinead Davies – Toni Zeltzer
- Camillo De Luca – Polymath (Portrait of Josh Frydenberg)
- Marc Etherington – King Ken (Ken Done in his studio)
- David Fairbairn – Large head JL no 3 (Portrait of John Lascelles)
- Betina Fauvel-Ogden – George Calombaris, masterchef (Winner of the Packing Room Prize 2016) (Image)
- Carla Fletcher – Twin souls, Linda Jackson
- Prudence Flint – Shower (Portrait of Athena Bellas)
- Juan Ford – Regaining sight (a meditation on Rose Soady) (Self-portrait)
- David Griggs – It's a G thang (Portrait of Max Francois Germanos)
- Guan Wei – Plastic surgery (Self-portrait)
- Tsering Hannaford – Self-portrait with magnolia
- Nicholas Harding – Peter Weiss AO
- Louise Hearman – Barry (Portrait of Barry Humphries) (Winner of the Archibald Prize 2016) (Image)
- Belynda Henry – Louise Olsen, a beautiful summary
- Mark Horton – Troy (Portrait of Troy Grant)
- Alan Jones – Pat (Portrait of Pat Corrigan)
- Guy Maestri – Shattered (Griggs) (Portrait of David Griggs)
- Dean Manning – Maximum Lawrence (Portrait of Lawrence Leung)
- Marie Mansfield – Study of Euan Macleod
- India Mark – Day at the gallery with Dane Taylor
- Michael McWilliams – The usurpers (self-portrait)
- Lewis Miller – Portrait of Bernie Teague
- Nick Mourtzakis – Self-portrait: in violet
- Kirsty Neilson – There's no humour in darkness (Portrait of Garry McDonald)
- William Rhodes – Alice
- Melissa Ritchie – Rhys smart mouth (Portrait of Rhys Nicholson)
- Monica Rohan – Easton Pearson (Portrait of Pamela Easton and Lydia Pearson)
- Sally Ross – Roslyn (Portrait of Roslyn Oxley)
- Marikit Santiago – Blacklustre (Portrait of Ramesh Mario Nithiyendran)
- Nick Stathopoulos – Deng (Portrait of Deng Adut) (Winner of the People's Choice Award 2016) (Image)
- Imants Tillers – Double reality (self-portrait) 2014–2016
- Rosemary Valadon – The Scribbler (Luke Sciberras)
- Natasha Walsh – Self-portrait
- Peter Wegner – John Wolseley
- Mirra Whale – Philip Nitschke
- Marcus Wills – The ersatz (James Batchelor)
- Heidi Yardley – Birth/death – portrait of Nell
- Zoe Young – Sam Harris (Portrait of Samantha Harris)

== See also ==
- Previous year: List of Archibald Prize 2015 finalists
- Next year: List of Archibald Prize 2017 finalists
- List of Archibald Prize winners
