= List of Archibald Prize 2021 finalists =

This is a list of finalists for the 2021 Archibald Prize for portraiture (listed is Artist – Title). 52 artworks were selected from the 938 entries received. 2021 was the first year with gender parity among the artists. As the images are copyrighted, an external link to an image has been listed where available.

- Benjamin Aitken – Gareth Sansom
- Julianne Ross Allcorn – I listen and they tell me the bush news
- Victoria Atkinson – Trent mango tree, all the colours of the rainbow, Trent
- Peter Berner – Stop pouting, you've had your turn
- Kate Beynon – Collaborative spirits
- Natasha Bieniek – Rachel Griffiths
- Karen Black – Professor Chandini Raina Macintyre
- Keith Burt – Sarah Holland-Batt – poet
- Ann Cape – The odd little bird (a portrait of Sam, Cam and Penguin Bloom)
- Tom Carment – Mara reading, in the kitchen at Mount Lofty
- Julia Ciccarone – The sea within (Winner: People's Choice Award 2021)
- Jun Chen – Artist – Joe Furlonger
- Matthew Clarke – Del Kathryn Barton is a good listener
- Lucy Culliton – Self (bogong moth jumper)
- Dagmar Cyrulla – Wendy
- Jonathan Dalton – Ramesh and the artist Ramesh
- Sinead Davies – The charity worker
- Graeme Drendel – Portrait of Jill
- Jaye Early – Masato_Takasaka
- Jeremy Eden – Firass
- Hong Fu – Professor Mabel Lee
- Tsering Hannaford – Her Excellency the Honourable Margaret Beazley AC QC
- Pat Hoffie – Visaya in a c-colour
- Matthew Kentmann – Les
- Xeni Kusumitra – adrift
- Kim Leutwyler – Kim
- Richard Lewer – Liz Laverty
- Dapeng Liu – A mind–body dualism portrait of Joanna Capon
- Kathrin Longhurst – Kate (Winner: Packing Room Prize 2021)
- Fiona Lowry – Matthys
- Mathew Lynn – Apprentice – self-portrait with Papa K (a.k.a. I do see colour)
- Shannon McCulloch – Ben
- William Mackinnon – Dark dad / extremis
- Euan Macleod – Blak Douglas
- Julian Meagher – Fozzy
- James Morrison – Portrait of Timothy Vernon Moore
- Sally M. Nangala Mulda – Two town camp stories
- Kirsty Neilson – Making noise
- Thea Anamara Perkins – Rachel
- James Powditch – Kerry O'Brien – all along the watch tower
- Jude Rae – Inside out
- Thom Roberts – A portriff of Adam (Shane Simpson AM)
- Joan Ross – Joan as a colonial woman looking at the future
- Sally Ross – Autoportrait
- Marikit Santiago – Filipiniana (self-portrait in collaboration with Maella Santiago Pearl)
- Kirthana Selvaraj – The green suit, a self-portrait
- Michael Snape – Stuart Purves
- Nick Stathopoulos – The white shirt – portrait of Tané Andrews
- Oliver Watts – Dorian Gray (Eryn Jean Norvill)
- Peter Wegner – Portrait of Guy Warren at 100 (Winner: Archibald Prize 2021)
- Mirra Whale – Repose
- Eunice Djerrkŋu Yunupiŋu – Me and my sisters

== See also ==
- Previous year: List of Archibald Prize 2020 finalists
- Next year: List of Archibald Prize 2022 finalists
- List of Archibald Prize winners
