= List of Archibald Prize 2020 finalists =

This is a list of finalists for the 2020 Archibald Prize for portraiture (listed is Artist – Title). As the images are copyrighted, an external link to an image has been listed where available.

- Abdul Abdullah - Untitled self-portrait
- Benjamin Aitken - Self-portrait entering the Archibald
- Kate Beynon - With Tudo and the robe
- Karen Black - Madonna (Portrait of Madonna Staunton)
- Charlene Carrington - My dad, Churchill Cann
- Jun Chen - The art dealer: Philip Bacon
- Samuel Rush Condon - Portrait of Adam Spencer
- Emily Crockford - Self-portrait with Daddy in the daisies, watching the field of planes
- Lucy Culliton - Soils for life (Portrait of Charlie Maslin)
- Susannah Curtis - Tara (Portrait of Tara Badcock)
- Jonathan Dalton - Angela (Portrait of Angela Tiatia)
- Sinead Davies - The Irish immigrant – portrait of Claire Dunne OAM
- Blak Douglas - Writing in the sand (Portrait of Dujuan Hoosan)
- Katherine Edney - David, Teena and the black dog (Portrait of David Capra)
- Marc Etherington - Sleeping beauty (portrait of Michael Reid OAM)
- Julie Fragar - Richard (Portrait of Richard Bell)
- Melanie Gray - Disquietude (Portrait of daughter Grace)
- Jane Guthleben - Annabel, the baker (Portrait of Annabel Crabb)
- Tsering Hannaford - Self-portrait after 'Allegory of Painting'
- Nicholas Harding - David Marr
- Louise Hearman - Barry Jones
- Yoshio Honjo - Adam with bream (Portrait of Adam Liaw)
- Edward Humphrey - Stan Walker
- Kim Leutwyler - Brian with pink, blue and yellow (Portrait of Brian Firkus)
- Richard Lewer - Liz Laverty
- Angus McDonald - Behrouz Boochani (Winner: People's Choice Award 2020)
- William Mackinnon - Sunshine and Lucky (life) (Portrait of Sunshine Bertrand)
- Guy Maestri - JB reading (Portrait of Jennifer Byrne)
- Scott Marsh - Salute of gentle frustration (Portrait of Adam Briggs)
- Charles Mouyat - Matt Kean, NSW Minister for Environment and Energy
- Justine Muller - Jack Mundey
- Vincent Namatjira - Stand strong for who you are (Portrait of Adam Goodes) (Winner: Archibald Prize 2020)
- Paul Newton - Maggie Tabberer 2020
- Ramesh Mario Nithiyendran - Self-portrait with outstretched arms
- Thea Anamara Perkins - Poppy Chicka (Portrait of Charles Madden)
- James Powditch - Once upon a time in Marrickville – Anthony Albanese
- Monica Rohan - Lucy (Portrait of Lucy Culliton)
- Craig Ruddy - 'Dark emu' – portrait of Bruce Pascoe
- Nick Santoro - Phanos at the Yeezy store (Portrait of Phanos Proestos)
- Jennifer Scott - Dr Raymond Charles Rauscher
- Wendy Sharpe - Magda Szubanski – comedy and tragedy
- Yuri Shimmyo - Carnation, lily, Yuri, rose (Self-portrait)
- Dee Smart - I'm here (Self-portrait)
- Wendy Spindler - Alive and brilliant (Portrait of Deborah Conway)
- Claus Stangl - L-FRESH the Lion
- Nick Stathopoulos - Ngaiire
- Alex Thorby - Portrait of Will (Portrait of Will Gollins)
- Neil Tomkins, Digby Webster - Ernest brothers (Self-portraits)
- John Ward Knox - Jacinda (Portrait of Jacinda Ardern)
- Peter Wegner - Chef's coat – Graeme Doyle
- Kaylene Whiskey - Dolly visits Indulkana (Self-portrait)
- Marcus Wills - Requiem (JR) (Portrait of Jack Riley)
- Meyne Wyatt - Meyne (Self-portrait) (Winner: Packing Room Prize 2020)
- Tiger Yaltangki - Self-portrait
- Tianli Zu - Tim and kelp (Portrait of Tim Flannery)

== See also ==
- Previous year: List of Archibald Prize 2019 finalists
- Next year: List of Archibald Prize 2021 finalists
- List of Archibald Prize winners
