= List of Archibald Prize 2022 finalists =

This is a list of finalists for the 2022 Archibald Prize for portraiture (listed is Artist – Title). Of the 816 entries received for the Archibald Prize, 52 artworks were selected as finalists. A record 20 Aboriginal Australian artists entered the prize in 2022. As the images are copyrighted, a link to each image is available through its reference.

- Mostafa Azimitabar – KNS088 (self-portrait)
- Natasha Bieniek – Patricia Piccinini
- Daniel Boyd – Untitled (AAO)
- Joanna Braithwaite – McManusstan
- Keith Burt – Bridie Gillman
- Ann Cape – Walking a tightrope
- Yvette Coppersmith – Ella Simons seated
- Emily Crockford – The pattern in the mountains of Studio A, best friends Emma and Gabrielle
- Jonathan Dalton – Day 77
- Anh Do – Peter, up close
- Blak Douglas – Moby Dickens (Karla Dickens) (Winner: Archibald Prize 2022)
- Yvonne East – Knee-deep (portrait of Lisa McCune)
- Jeremy Eden – Samuel Johnson OAM (Winner: People's Choice Award 2022)
- David Fenoglio – Yuriyal, Eric
- Hong Fu – Portrait of Peter Wegner
- Eliza Gosse – somewhere near home
- Robert Hannaford – Hirsute self-portrait
- Tsering Hannaford – Sally Scales
- Katherine Hattam – Helen Garner speaks French
- HEGO – OA
- Yoshio Honjo – Yumi Stynes as onna-musha (female samurai)
- Ksenija Hrnjak – Red gloves of Tim Tszyu
- Laura Jones – Brooke and Jimmy
- Solomon Kammer – The (disabled artist) hustle
- Jasper Knight – Abdul Abdullah
- Kim Leutwyler – Courtney and Shane
- Richard Lewer – Liz Laverty
- Dapeng Liu – John and the light of ultramarine (John Yu)
- Kathrin Longhurst – Irrational
- Fiona Lowry – Glenn Murcutt
- Mathew Lynn – Yaka moto, Magic Pierre
- Catherine McGuiness – Rosary with the seagull
- Noel McKenna – Patrick Corrigan OA, with Rosie
- Robert Malherbe – Dana, head in hands
- Lewis Miller – Deborah Conway
- Vincent Namatjira – Self-portrait with dingo
- Paul Newton – Portrait of Hugh Jackman and Deborra-Lee Furness
- Meagan Pelham – Romance is LOVE
- James Powditch – Laura Tingle – the fourth estate
- Jude Rae – The big switch – portrait of Dr Saul Griffith
- Jordan Richardson – Venus
- Thom Roberts – Rachey in the mirror
- Joan Ross – 'You were my biggest regret': diary entry 1806
- Wendy Sharpe – Self-portrait with ghosts
- Claus Stangl – Taika Waititi (Winner: Packing Room Prize 2022)
- Nick Stathopoulos – The red scarf: portrait of Wayne Tunnicliffe
- Ross Townsend – Staying strong
- Avraham Vofsi – John Safran as David and Goliath
- Felix von Dallwitz – Dylan Alcott, AOTY
- Natasha Walsh – Dear Brett (the blue room)
- Michael Zavros – At the British Museum
- Caroline Zilinsky – Kubla Khan
