= List of Archibald Prize 2019 finalists =

This is a list of finalists for the 2019 Archibald Prize for portraiture (listed is Artist – Title). As the images are copyrighted, an external link to an image has been listed where available.

- Clara Adolphs – Rosemary Laing and Geoff Kleem (in their garden)
- John Beard – Edmund (+ Bill) (Portrait of Edmund Capon)
- Natasha Bieniek – Waiting for Arden (Self-portrait)
- Shane Bowden – Self-portrait sitting in a red chair, Avalon
- Keith Burt – Benjamin Law: happy sad
- Tom Carment – Katoomba portrait – James Scanlon
- Jun Chen – Mao's last dancer – Li Cunxin
- Erika Cholich – Unadorned (self-portrait)
- Samuel Rush Condon – Self-portrait, Paris
- Luke Cornish – Cato, Callie and Comet (Portrait of Sue Cato)
- Tony Costa - Lindy Lee (Winner: Archibald Prize 2019)
- Jonathan Dalton – Sally. And her boys. (Portrait of Sally Anderson)
- David Darcy – Tjuparntarri – women's business (Portrait of Daisy Tjuparntarri Ward) (Winner: People's Choice Award 2019)
- Sinead Davies – The endocrinologist – Professor Katherine Samaras
- Anh Do – Art and war (Portrait of George Gittoes)
- Blak Douglas – White shells, black heart (Portrait of Esme Timbery)
- Katherine Edney – Self-portrait with Ariel
- Marc Etherington – Idris Murphy and his dog Wally
- Carla Fletcher – Charge of the Star Goddess (((Del Kathryn Barton)))
- Prudence Flint – The stand (Portrait of Richard Stringer)
- Kendal Gear – Self-portrait
- Kate Gradwell – Yindyamarra: a portrait of Professor Michael McDaniel
- David Griggs – Tracing the antiquity of Jewish alchemy with Alexie Glass-Kantor
- Tsering Hannaford – Mrs Singh (Portrait of Anant Singh)
- Laura Jones – Nakkiah in her dressing room (Portrait of Nakkiah Lui)
- Kirpy – Dylan (Portrait of Dylan Alcott)
- Jasper Knight – Jason Phu
- Kim Leutwyler – Faustina (Portrait of Faustina Agolley)
- Mathew Lynn – Crow (Maddy Madden)
- Tessa MacKay – Through the looking glass (Portrait of David Wenham) (Winner: Packing Room Prize 2019)
- Angus McDonald – Mariam Veiszadeh
- Euan Macleod – Four Rodneys (Portrait of Rodney Pople)
- Bridgette McNab – Karla (Portrait of Karla Špetić)
- Nigel Milsom – Judo house part 8 (a perfect light) (Self-portrait)
- Vincent Namatjira – Art is our weapon – portrait of Tony Albert
- Ramesh Mario Nithiyendran – Multi-limbed self-portrait (after ceramic figures)
- Adam Norton – David Griggs, outta space
- Thea Anamara Perkins – Christian (Portrait of Christian Thompson)
- Jude Rae – Sarah Peirse as Miss Docker in Patrick White's 'A cheery soul'
- Jordan Richardson – Annabel (Portrait of Annabel Crabb)
- Paul Ryan – Self-portrait in the studio with the Beastie Boys, painting James Drinkwater for the Archibald Prize (Los amigos)
- Loribelle Spirovski – Meg and Amos (and Art) (Portrait of Megan Washington)
- Vanessa Stockard – McLean (Portrait of McLean Edwards)
- Clare Thackway – Billow and tide (Portrait of Lauren Brincat)
- Imants Tillers – All hail Greg Inglis
- Michael Vale – Kid Congo on the island of the pink monkey birds
- Natasha Walsh – A liminal space (Self-portrait)
- Mirra Whale – Leigh (Portrait of Leigh Sales)
- Karyn Zamel – My self (Self-portrait)

== See also ==
- Previous year: List of Archibald Prize 2018 finalists
- Next year: List of Archibald Prize 2020 finalists
- List of Archibald Prize winners
