= List of Archibald Prize 2017 finalists =

This is a list of finalists for the 2017 Archibald Prize for portraiture. As the images are copyright, an external link to an image has been listed where available (listed is Artist – Title).

- Tony Albert – Self-portrait (ash on me)
- Jessica Ashton – Self-portrait as a clown
- Kate Beynon – With amulets and their shadows (Self-portrait)
- Andrew Bonneau – Portrait of Ayako Saito
- Boys of Sydney Grammar Edgecliff Preparatory School – Goodbye, Sir! (Portrait of Dr John Vallance)
- Keith Burt – Bare Tarragh (Portrait of Tarragh Cunningham)
- Mitch Cairns – Agatha Gothe-Snape (Winner of the Archibald Prize 2017)
- Jon Campbell – Two sunny boys (Peter Oxley and Jeremy Oxley)
- Jun Chen – Ray Hughes
- Yvette Coppersmith – Professor Gillian Triggs
- Tony Costa – Simon Chan
- Lucy Culliton – Finished packing (Portrait of Steve Peters)
- Jonathan Dalton – Lottie and James (Portrait of Lottie Consalvo and James Drinkwater)
- Anh Do – JC (Portrait of Jack Charles) (Winner of the People's Choice Award 2017) (Image)
- Marc Etherington – Paul (Paul Williams in his studio)
- Prudence Flint – The meal (Portrait of Athena Bellas)
- Ashley Frost – Janet Dawson at the doorway to her studio
- Andrew Lloyd Greensmith – The inner stillness of Eileen Kramer
- David Griggs – Twisting Cain with a brown eye while lacking a constitution for darkness (Self-portrait)
- Robert Hannaford – Michael Chaney
- Tsering Hannaford – Self-portrait
- Nicholas Harding – John Olsen AO, OBE
- Sophia Hewson – Untitled (Richard Bell)
- Tjungkara Ken – Kungkarangkalpa tjukurpa (Seven Sisters dreaming), a self-portrait
- Julius Killerby – Paul Little
- Kim Leutwyler – Heyman (Portrait of Michelle Heyman)
- Richard Lewer – Liz Laverty
- Luke, William H – Remy QC (Portrait of Remy van de Wiel)
- Robert Malherbe – Self-portrait
- Phil Meatchem – Aah yeah, that guy (Portrait of Francis Greenslade)
- Vincent Namatjira – Self-portrait on Friday
- Paul Newton – Portrait of Rupert Myer AO
- Jordan Richardson – John (Portrait of John Bell)
- Dee Smart – The mayor of Bondi (Portrait of John Macarthur)
- Peter Smeeth – Lisa Wilkinson AM (Winner of the Packing Room Prize 2017) (Image)
- Gerard Smith – Elizabeth St over Hyde Park (Portrait of Helen Littleton)
- Loribelle Spirovski – John Bell at home
- Vanessa Stockard – Self-portrait as new mum
- Noel Thurgate – Homage to Peter Powditch
- Natasha Walsh – The scent of rain (self-portrait)
- what – Robert Forster
- Marcus Wills – Protagonist, antagonist (Thomas M Wright)
- Madeleine Winch – Facing the canvas (Self-portrait)

== See also ==
- Previous year: List of Archibald Prize 2016 finalists
- Next year: List of Archibald Prize 2018 finalists
- List of Archibald Prize winners
