= List of Archibald Prize 2011 finalists =

This is a list of finalists for the 2011 Archibald Prize for portraiture (listed is Artist – Title).

- Abdul Abdullah – Waleed Aly
- Giles Alexander – Space or bust (portrait of Sam Leach)
- Del Kathryn Barton – Mother (a portrait of Cate)
- Jason Benjamin – It's not all Henry bloody Lawson (portrait of musician Gareth Liddiard)
- Kate Beynon – Painting shirt (self-portrait)
- Natasha Bieniek – October (self-portrait)
- Deidre But-Husaim – Roy Ananda (chin support)
- Marcus Callum – Portrait of a seated woman (portrait of Vanessa Callum)
- Adam Chang – John Coetzee (Winner of the 2011 People's Choice Award)
- Zhong Chen – Self-portrait on a horse
- Adam Cullen – Charlie (portrait of barrister Charles Waterstreet)
- Lucy Culliton – Ray in Paris (portrait of art dealer Ray Hughes)
- Susanne de Berenger – Ted Robinson
- Ken Done – Me, March 2011 (self-portrait)
- Matt Doust – White Cocoon (portrait of actress Gemma Ward)
- Geoffrey Dyer – The collector, David Walsh
- Vincent Fantauzzo – Matt Moran (Winner of the 2011 Packing Room Prize)
- Nicholas Harding – Hugo at home (portrait of actor Hugo Weaving)
- Jeremy Kibel – Portrait of Robert Jacks AO
- Sonia Kretschmar – The heart of things (portrait of Cassandra Golds)
- Michael Lindeman – Portrait of Wilfred (portrait of actor Jason Gann)
- Song Ling – My name is Fartunate – self-portrait
- Fiona Lowry – Portrait of Tim Silver
- Tom Macbeth – Jessica (portrait of sailor Jessica Watson)
- Amanda Marburg – DA (portrait of writer David Astle)
- Angus McDonald – Dr Ann Lewis AO
- Alexander McKenzie – Richard Roxburgh
- Christopher McVinish – Portrait of Robyn Nevin
- Andrew Mezei – Professor Penny Sackett, astronomer and physicist
- Lewis Miller – Small self-portrait
- Rodney Pople – Artist and family (after Caravaggio) (portrait of artist, his wife Felicity Fenner and their two sons)
- Ben Quilty – Margaret Olley (Winner of the Archibald Prize)
- Craig Ruddy – Cathy Freeman
- Jenny Sages – My Jack (portrait of artist's husband, Jack Sages)
- Jiawei Shen – Self-portrait as Quong Tart's contemporary (after John Thomson), 2010
- Xenia Stefanescu – Woven in tapestry of life (self-portrait)
- Tim Storrier – Moon boy (self-portrait as a young man)
- Pam Tippett – Self-portrait (for a change)
- Barbara Tyson – The country's woman: Her Excellency, Ms Quentin Bryce AC, Governor-General of Australia
- Peter Wegner – Richard Morecroft
- Apple Xiu Yin – Hearing • Meditation (portrait of operatic soprano Cheryl Barker)

== See also ==
- Previous year: List of Archibald Prize 2010 finalists
- Next year: List of Archibald Prize 2012 finalists
- List of Archibald Prize winners
