= Gallipoli Art Prize =

Australian art award

The Gallipoli Art Prize is an Australian acquisitive art prize that celebrates the Gallipoli campaign of the First World War, awarded annually by the Gallipoli Memorial Club and worth A$20,000.

The prize's organisers began work in 2004. The Anzac Centenary Art Prize project was announced on 15 April 2005 by Australian prime minister John Howard. The inaugural prize was awarded in 2006, when it was won by Margaret Hadfield.

Entries do not need to reference the Gallipoli campaign or portray war: entrants are instead encouraged to "respond imaginatively to the Gallipoli Memorial Club's creed":

We believe that within the community there exists an obligation for all to preserve the special qualities of loyalty, respect, love of country, courage and comradeship which were personified by the heroes of the Gallipoli Campaign and bequeathed to all humanity as a foundation for perpetual peace and universal freedom.

The award is run by the Gallipoli Memorial Club. It is open to artists born in Australia, New Zealand or Turkey or holding citizenship of those countries. A connected prize in Turkey, the Canakkale Art Prize, is also run annually and sponsored by the club.

== Prize Winners ==
Year	Artist	Name of work	note
2006	Margaret Hadfield	Ataturk’s Legacy	
2007	Lianne Gough	Glorus Fallen	
2008	Tom Carment	Max Carment, War Veteran (The last portrait)	
2009	Euan Macleod	Smoke/PinkLandscape/Shovel	
2010	Raymond Arnold	The dead march here today	
2011	Hadyn Wilson	Sacrifice	
2012	Geoff Harvey	Trench Interment	
2013	Peter Wegner	Dog in a Gas Mask	
2014	Idris Murphy	Gallipoli evening 2013	
2015	Sally Robinson	Boy Soldiers	
2016	Jiawei Shen	Yeah, Mate!	
2017	Amanda Penrose Hart	The Sphinx, Perpetual Peace	
2018	Steve Lopes	Mont St Quentin	
2019	Martin King	War Pigeon Diaries	
2020	Alison Mackay	Breathe	
2021	Geoff Harvey	Forgotten Heroes	
2022	Deirdre Bean	Along the ride to Damascus	
2023	Andrew Tomkins	Ray’s Room	
2024	Luke Cornish	The Pity of War	
