= Karla Dickens =

Australian Wiradjuri installation artist

Karla Dickens (born 2 December 1967) is an Aboriginal Australian installation artist of the Wiradjuri people, as of 2020 based in Lismore, New South Wales. Her works are in major public collections in Australia.

== Early life and education ==
Dickens was born on 2 December 1967 in Sydney and lived in several suburbs. Her father worked on the wharves and drove trucks. Her mother was a factory worker. She was close to her grandmother, who lived in Mascot, where a group of Aboriginal people taken off their land had settled. Her grandmother married a German immigrant who promised her a house, and Dickens' father was their only child. Her grandparents were important influences, and her grandfather started her on her journey to re-use found materials. Dickens is of Wiradjuri heritage.

In interviews, Dickens says she loved primary school and was class captain, house captain and school captain. She loved geography, maths and art, and continually made things at home, cutting and pasting.

Her teen years were difficult, and she became addicted to drugs, ending up in her twenties in rehabilitation. When she left rehab, she enrolled at the National Art School in Sydney. She finished her degree in 1993/94 and could no longer afford to live in Sydney.

== Career ==
In 1994 Dickens left Sydney, aged 27, wanting to pursue art. She moved to Lismore, about 590 km (370 mi) north of Sydney.

"Apart from art I have had much needed work to do on myself – my mental health and recovery were the most important considerations for me, so I didn’t really take my art seriously commercially until I had my daughter in 2005".

At this time she had a daughter, and found living in regional Australia affordable. She was also in Bundjalung country and found the Aboriginal community welcoming.

In 2003 Dickens moved to the Northern Rivers area. Elaine and Gordon Sryon opened up a gallery called Blackfellas Dreaming Art Gallery and Museum in Bangalow, and Dickens became involved. She bought a small house in Bangalow. In 2007 she moved to the Lismore suburb of Goonellabah to an old house with plenty of studio room and made a home for herself and her daughter where they grow their own food.

In 2013 she created January 26, Day of Mourning. (Note: January 26 is Australia Day, recognising the arrival of British colonists.) She found an old Australian flag at her local tip, and embroidered it with black crosses so it became a symbol of Aboriginal mourning. The work won the 2013 Parliament of New South Wales Aboriginal Art Award.

Her series in the next years, Workhorse (2015), Bound (2016) and Sleeping Beauty (2016) and Warrior Woman (2018), drew from history, including personal histories from her own family.

"Transgenerational trauma implicit in these works is interwoven into my own history. Creating work relating to these issues gives a voice to women across the board."

Dickens has also worked in film. In 2011 she made The Honey and The Bunny about the South Sydney Rabbitohs, an Australian Rugby League Team. In 2017 she made a short film, The Queen's Road which incorporated many photos from Queen Elizabeth's visit to Australia in 1954. The film also focused on a young Aboriginal girl.

In 2017 Dickens' work was included in the 3rd National Indigenous Art Triennial, called Defying Empire, at the National Gallery of Australia. At the time she noted that her art was her way to protest, to present her own and her people's history.

Also in 2017 Dickens' work was featured in The National: New Australian Art exhibition sponsored by the Art Gallery of New South Wales, the Museum of Contemporary Art and the Carriageworks in Sydney. Her work Bound comprised six straight jackets she had dyed and then embellished with various found items, including human hair, combs and monkey teeth. For her, each represented why women stay in abusive relationships. In Fight Club she installed six metal lids from trash bins, and inscribed on them her own poetry.

In March 2020 the Art Gallery of New South Wales commissioned Dickens to create a work for a niche in its portico that has remained empty since it was built. The previous commission for a panel by sculptor Dora Ohlfsen was cancelled in 1913. Her work, A Dickensian Circus, was on display at the Art Gallery of New South Wales for the Biennale of Sydney in December 2020. The work celebrates Indigenous circus performers and boxers who travelled in troupes around Australia to entertain and fairs.

"I know and have known quite a lot of Elders who talk fondly of their days boxing. Their backs straighten, their eyes light up and often one shoulder will bend forward when they talk of boxing with great pride. Their pride inspired me to explore and research the troupes while some of the old fellas are still alive."

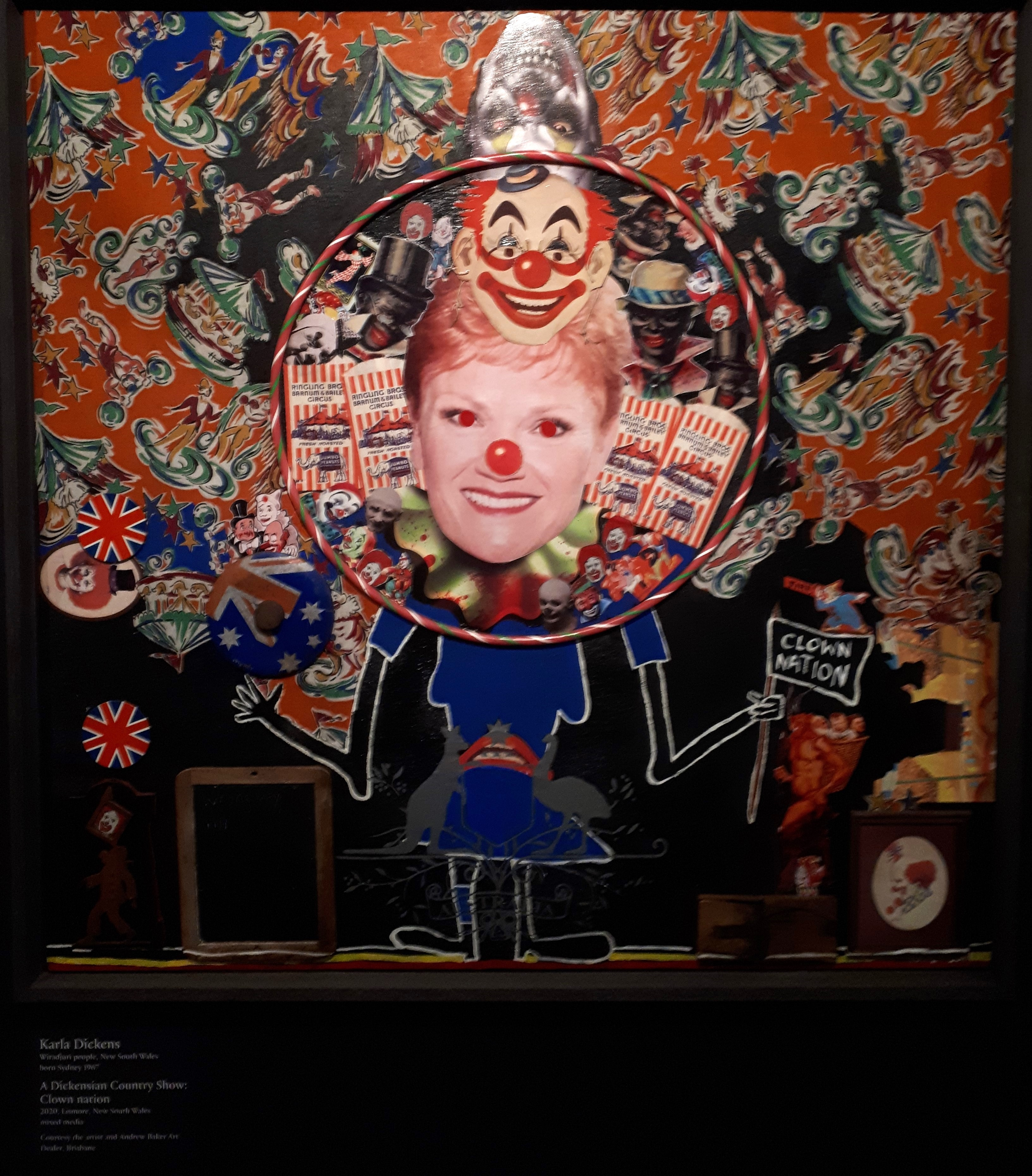
"Clown Nation"

In the 2020 Adelaide Biennial of Australian Art at the Art Gallery of South Australia, titled "Monster Theatres", her Dickensian Country Show occupied an entire gallery space, as a "fun fair" with darker underlying meanings to the titles of the carnival rides: "Colonial Roundabout", "Live Stock" and "Warn a Brother". "Clown Nation" is a collage that includes the face of politician Pauline Hanson, founder and leader of the right-wing populist party One Nation.

== Art practice ==
As of 2020 Dickens lives and practises her art in Goonellabah, Lismore, New South Wales.

She is known for works that offer reflections on Australian culture past and present. She repurposes materials in unexpected ways and often addresses issues of race, sexuality, and gender. Dickens is a weaver, embroiderer of fabrics and creative user of various materials.

Some of her works project whimsy and mischief. In a 2020 interview she said "The more you know the rules, the more fun it is to break them".

== Recognition and awards ==
In 2013, Dickens won the 2013 Parliament of NSW Aboriginal Art Prize, worth A$40,000, for January 26, Day of Mourning.

In 2018, she won the inaugural Copyright Agency Fellowship for Visual Art, worth A$80,000, to support her production of a new multimedia installation, A Dickensian Circus, celebrating Indigenous boxers and Lismore acrobat Cornelius Sullivan.

A portrait of Dickens titled Moby Dickens, by Blak Douglas, won the 2022 Archibald Prize.

== Exhibitions ==
=== Solo exhibitions ===
- "Karla Dickens, 'Cross'", 24 May - 21 June, DQ on Oxford Gallery, year unknown
- "A selection of Paintings and Lithographs from Karla Dickens", 30 May - 30 June, The Bank Gallery, Darlinghurst, Sydney, year unknown
- "Now Nowhere Here", Karla Dickens, 3–17 July 2000, DQ Gallery, Oxford Street, Taylor Square
- "Unwind: An exhibition of recent paintings by Karla Dickens", 3–20 October 2001, A - Space on Cleveland, Surry Hills, Sydney
- "Love, Luck and Lust - Karla Dickens", September 2003, A - Space on Cleveland, Surry Hills, Sydney
- "Karla Dickens: Field and Game", 29 September - 24 October 2012, The Hughes Gallery, Surry Hills, Sydney
- "Karla Dickens: Black Dogs, Love and Crutches, 6 May - 6 June 2015, Andrew Baker Art Dealer, Bowen Hills, Queensland
- "Karla Dickens: Black and Blue", 14 September - 15 October 2016, Andrew Baker Art Dealer, Bowen Hills, Queensland
- "Karla Dickens: Lucky Bastards and Fast Food", 11 April - 12 May 2018, Baker Art Dealer, Bowen Hills, Queensland
- "Karla Dickens: SOS", 18 November - 19 December 2020, Baker Art Dealer, Bowen Hills, Queensland
- "Karla Dickens: Loving Memory", 13 June - 12 July 2008, Lismore Regional Gallery, NSW
- "Karla Dickens", 2–13 September 2008, Iain Dawson Gallery, Paddington NSW

=== Group exhibitions ===
- "C.O.P." Works by Shaun Gladwell, Karla Dickens, Cal Foote, 25 August - 15 September 1995
- "'No Limits': Recent Paintings by Karla Dickens/Art from Arnhem Land/ DIDI presents Art and Artefacts from the Torres Strait Islands", Hogarth Galleries, Paddington 1998
- 2020 Adelaide Biennial of Australian Art at the Art Gallery of South Australia, titled "Monster Theatres"

== Collections ==
Dickens has works in major collections, including:

- Art Gallery of Western Australia
- Australian National Maritime Museum
- National Gallery of Australia
- National Portrait Gallery
- University of Canberra
