= Marcus Wills =

Australian painter

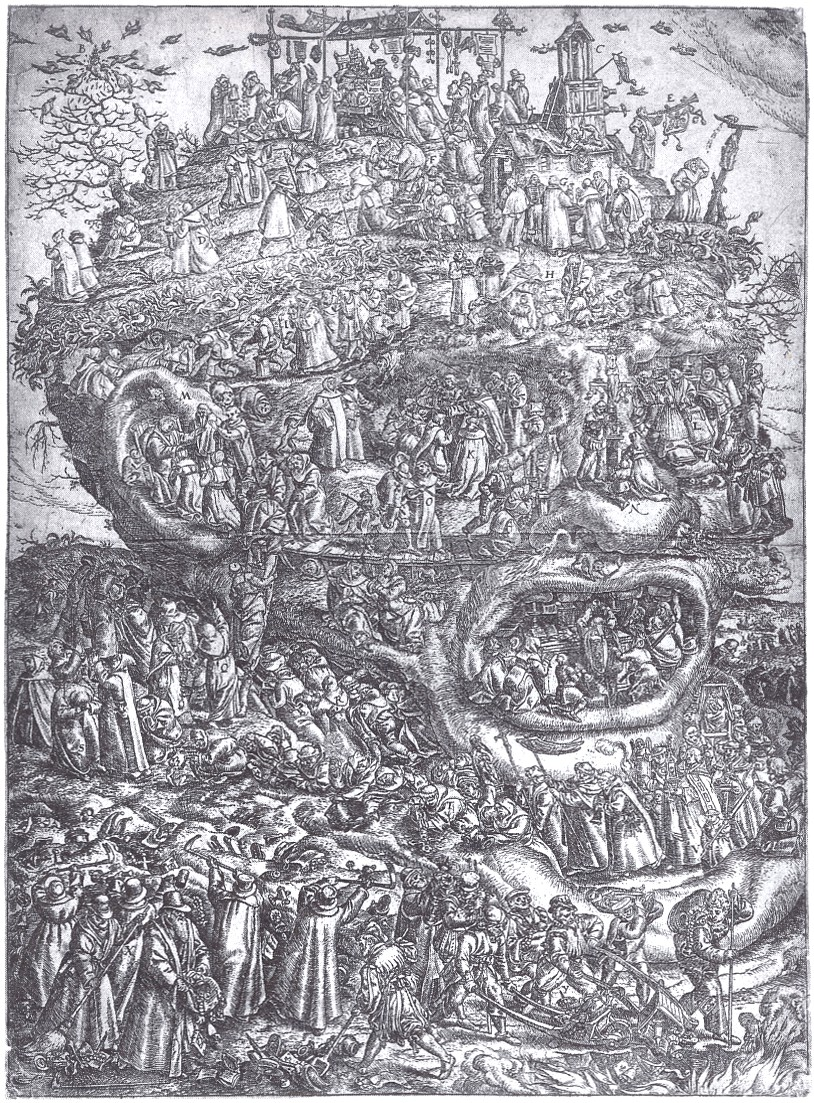
His Archibald Prize winning painting was based on this print by Marcus Gheeraerts the Elder

Marcus Wills (born 1972) is an Australian painter, winner of the 2006 Archibald Prize and finalist in many other art competitions.

== Early life and education ==
Wills was born in Kaniva, Victoria in 1972.

He studied for an Advanced Certificate of Art and Design between 1989 and 1991 at the Wimmera Community College of TAFE (now Federation University Australia's Horsham Campus). He graduated from the Victorian College of the Arts in 1995.

== Career ==
His work has been displayed in a number of exhibitions, and he has held solo exhibitions in Melbourne since 1992. He paints in the style which mixes figurative and realist styles.

== Awards ==
He was the winner of the 2006 Archibald Prize for his painting of The Paul Juraszek Monolith, which was based on an engraving by Marcus Gheeraerts the Elder.

In 2000, he won the second Brett Whiteley Travelling Art Scholarship.

He has been a finalist in the Sir John Sulman Prize (2003, 2010 and 2013) and Wynne Prize (2010).

He was a finalist of the Archibald Prize in 2015 with El cabeceo, 2016 with The ersatz (James Batchelor)., 2018 and 2020 with Requiem (JR) (Portrait of Jack Riley).

In 2017 he was again a finalist in the Archibald, with a portrait of filmmaker Thomas M. Wright called Antagonist, Protagonist (Thomas M. Wright). Wills set up the scene to look like a crime drama, with Wright as protagonist.

He was a finalist for the 2024 Archibald Prize with a portrait of ballet dancer Callum Linnane.

Awards
Preceded by John Olsen	Archibald Prize; 2006 for The Paul Juraszek Monolith	Succeeded by John Beard
