= Nicholas Harding =

Australian artist (1956–2022)

- Born: 1956; London, England
- Died: 2 November 2022 (aged 66)
- Known for: Painting
- Awards: Archibald Prize; 2001 John Bell as King Lear; Wynne Prize; 2022 Eora
- Website: nicholasharding.com.au

Nicholas Harding (1956 – 2 November 2022) was a British-born Australian artist, known for his paintings, in particular portraits.

== Early life ==
Harding was born in London, England in 1956. In 1965 his family emigrated to Australia, settling in the Sydney suburb of Normanhurst. He became an Australian citizen in 1974.

== Career ==
Harding is known for his oil paintings done in a thickly layered impasto technique, his watercolours, and his large scale drawings in ink, mainly for landscape subjects; he is also an acclaimed portrait artist.

== Recognition and awards ==
Harding won the Archibald Prize in 2001 with a portrait of John Bell as King Lear. He also won the People's Choice Award at the 2005 Archibald, with Bob's Daily Swim. He was a finalist in the Archibald Prize for thirteen years in a row from 1994 to 2006, and also in 2009, 2011, 2016, 2017, 2018, and 2020.

Harding was exhibited in the finalists for the Sulman Prize in 1981, 2003, 2006 and the Wynne Prize in 1994, 1996, 1998, 2003, 2016, and 2017, winning in 2022 with Eora. He also won the Dobell Drawing Prize in 2001 with Eddy Avenue (3). Harding was awarded a Centenary Medal in 2001.

His painting Robert Drewe (in the swell) was a 2006 Archibald Prize finalist and was purchased in 2010 by the National Portrait Gallery in Canberra for its permanent collection which also includes his portraits Hugo at Home 2011 (portrait of Hugo Weaving), Richard Roxburgh 2014, and John Olsen AO 2017.

His painting Beach life (pink zinc and figures) 2006 won the inaugural Kilgour Prize at the Newcastle Art Gallery in 2006.

In 2015 his painting Beached (Yuraygir self portrait) won the National Self-Portrait Prize People's Choice Award.

== Major exhibitions ==
His work has been the subject of more than 40 solo exhibitions since 1992 and has been included in over 100 group exhibitions since 1982.

Drawn to Paint, a major 25-year survey exhibition of his work, was held at the S. H. Ervin Gallery in 2010.

28 Portraits, a survey exhibition of his portraits, was held at the National Portrait Gallery in 2017.

In 2021 his 2001 Archibald Prize-winning portrait John Bell as King Lear was included in the Archie 100 exhibition at the Art Gallery of New South Wales celebrating 100 years of the Archibald Prize.

== Collections ==
Harding's work is included in many public collections, including the National Gallery of Australia, National Portrait Gallery, Art Gallery of New South Wales, Art Gallery of South Australia, Tweed River Art Gallery, Newcastle Art Gallery, Maitland Regional Art Gallery and Trinity College, Melbourne.

== Publications ==
In 2020 he published From the Wings a limited-edition 312-page book containing a selection of his theatre rehearsal drawings from 2013 to 2018.

== Personal life and death ==
Harding was diagnosed with tongue cancer in 2017. He documented his cancer journey in a self-portrait entitled Treatment, day 49 (sorbolene soak). Harding died on 2 November 2022, at the age of 66. An exhibition of his final landscapes opened at Philip Bacon Galleries in Brisbane less than two weeks later.

Awards
Preceded by Adam Cullen	Archibald Prize; 2001 for John Bell as King Lear	Succeeded by Cherry Hood
