= Julie Fragar =

Australian painter and educator

- Born: 5 March 1977 (age 49); Gosford, New South Wales, Australia
- Education: Sydney College of the Arts
- Awards: Archibald Prize (2025)
- Website: www.juliefragar.com

Julie Fragar (born 5 March 1977) is an Australian painter and educator. She is the recipient of several awards in Australia, including the 2025 Archibald Prize for portraiture, and the 2017 Ramsay Art Prize Lipman Karas People's Choice Award. Her work has been acquired by major collections, such as the Art Gallery of New South Wales and Queensland Art Gallery.

== Life ==
Fragar was born in Gosford, NSW, in 1977. She grew up in Wee Waa and attended and graduated from Wee Waa High School.

== Work ==
Fragar has been exhibiting her paintings since the 1990s. Her art and research explores the relationships between painterly and personal languages, both biographical and autobiographical. Her paintings are composed as dense agglomerations of fragmented images, “not layers but many images knitted together in one go”. Fragar's earlier paintings drew on her own life and environment as subject matter, combining these with an interest in, and explicit reference to, Gustave Courbet's realism.

Her work has been acquired by major collections, including the Art Gallery of New South Wales and Queensland Art Gallery, and is represented by The Renshaws', nationally in Australia.

== Awards and honours ==
- In 2005 she won the ABN Amro Emerging Artists Award
- In 2014 she won the Pine Rivers Art Award, was included in the Moran Art Prize, the Archibald Prize, and the Gold Art Award.
- Her 2016 painting Goose Chase: All of Us Together Here and Nowhere, Kilgour Prize 2016 finalist and winner of the 2017 Ramsay Art Prize, Lipman Karas People's Choice Award. The piece explores the story of Antonio de Fraga, her first paternal ancestor to emigrate to Australia in the 19th century.
- Another painting in the same series, Antonio Departs Flores on the Whaling Tide, won the Tidal: City of Devonport National Art Award 2016.
- In 2017 she painted the official portrait of Anna Bligh, Queensland's first female premier.
- In 2020 she was a finalist for the Sylvia Jones Prize for Women Artists with There Goes the Floor: Self-Portrait 2020 at the Brisbane Portrait Prize.
- In 2025, Fragar won the Archibald Prize for her painting Flagship Mother Multiverse (Justene), a portrait of fellow artist Justene Williams.

Awards
| Preceded by Laura Jones | Archibald Prize; 2025 for Flagship Mother Multiverse (Justene) | Succeeded by Richard Lewer |
