= Guy Maestri =

Australian contemporary artist

- Born: Guido Maestri
- Education: National Art School in Darlinghurst
- Known for: Painting
- Awards: Archibald Prize; 2009 Geoffrey Gurrumul Yunupingu

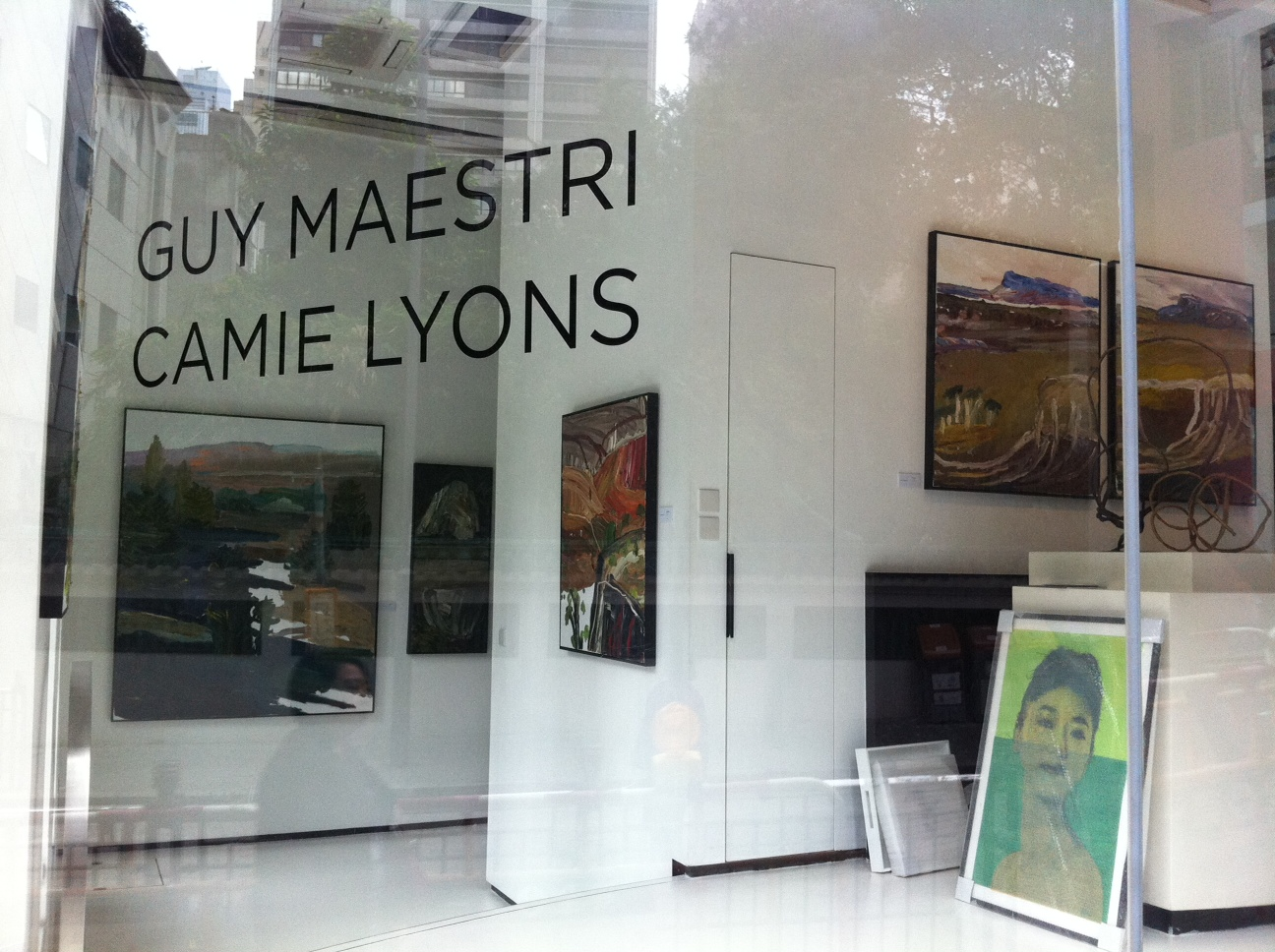
Cat Street Gallery, Hong Kong

Guido Maestri (born in Mudgee, New South Wales in 1974) is an Australian contemporary artist. He won the 2009 Archibald Prize for a portrait of Australian singer and musician Geoffrey Gurrumul Yunupingu which he later donated to the National Portrait Gallery in Canberra.

Maestri completed a Bachelor of Fine Arts at the National Art School in Darlinghurst in 2003. He was a finalist in the 2007 and 2008 Dobell Drawing Prize. He was also an Archibald Prize finalist in 2016, 2020 and 2024 and a Wynne Prize finalist in 2012, 2013, 2014, 2016, 2017, 2018, 2021 and 2023. His 2020 Wynne Prize entry, The rain song, was acquired by the Art Gallery of New South Wales.

He is represented by Jan Murphy Gallery (Brisbane) and Yavuz Gallery (Sydney and Singapore).

== See also ==
- List of Archibald Prize winners

Awards
Preceded by Del Kathryn Barton	Archibald Prize; 2009 for Geoffrey Gurrumul Yunupingu	Succeeded by Sam Leach
