= Nigel Milsom =

Australian painter (born 1975)

- Born: 1975 (age 50–51); Albury, New South Wales, Australia
- Education: University of Newcastle (BA); University of New South Wales (BFA Hons, MFA)
- Awards: Sulman Prize (2012); Doug Moran Portrait Prize (2013); Archibald Prize (2015)

Nigel Milsom is an Australian painter.

== Early life ==
Milsom was born in 1975 in the southern New South Wales city of Albury. He completed a Bachelor of Arts (Visual Arts) at the University of Newcastle in 1998, and then undertook postgraduate studies at the College of Fine Arts of the University of New South Wales, gaining a Bachelor of Fine Arts (Honours) in 1999 and a Master of Fine Arts in 2002. Milsom worked at the Art Gallery of New South Wales in the early 2000s as a Gallery Services officer and credits this experience as another part of his art education.

In 2014, Milsom was convicted and sentenced to a maximum six-and-a-half years imprisonment for the April 2012 armed robbery, while under the influence of drugs and alcohol, of a 7-Eleven in Glebe, an inner neighbourhood of Sydney. The sentence was reduced on appeal to two years and four months’ imprisonment. Milsom was released from Cessnock Correctional Centre on parole in April 2015.

== Career ==
His painting Judo house pt 6 (the white bird), a portrait of barrister Charles Waterstreet, won the 2015 Archibald Prize. In 2014 Milsom won the Doug Moran National Portrait Prize for his painting. Uncle Paddy and in 2012 he won the Sulman Prize for his painting Judo House pt 4 (Golden mud). He was the Archibald Prize finalist in 2019.

Gallery owner and art dealer Kerry Crowley described Milsom's work as "influenced by the nineteenth-century Japanese master Hokusai, Edward Hopper, white-on-white abstractionist Robert Ryman, Gerhard Richter, and Pop figurative painter Alex Katz."

== Collections ==
- Art Gallery of New South Wales
- Museum of Contemporary Art Australia
- Newcastle Art Gallery

Awards
Preceded by Fiona Lowry	Archibald Prize; 2015 for Charles Waterstreet	Succeeded by Louise Hearman
