= Imants Tillers =

Australian artist, curator and writer

Imants Tillers (born 1950), is an Australian artist, curator and writer. He lives and works in Cooma, New South Wales.

== Early life and education ==
Imants Tillers was born in Sydney in 1950, the child of Latvian immigrants. In 1973 he graduated from the University of Sydney with a Bachelor of Science in Architecture (Hons), and the University Medal.

== Career ==
Tillers held his first solo exhibition in the early 1970s. During the following decade, he started producing his paintings using a system of small canvas boards, with the individual boards either stacked, or hung in a grid-like fashion to create large tableaux.

His artworks are complex, infused with intellectual references to a wide range of topics, including history, poetry and philosophy, as well as his own personal experiences.

Tillers also produced a number of collaborative works with Warlpiri artist Kumantje Jagamara (Michael Nelson Jagamara, between 2001 and Jagamara's death in 2020.

== Exhibitions ==
Tillers has exhibited widely since the late 1960s, and has represented Australia at important international exhibitions such as the São Paulo Bienal in 1975, Documenta 7 in 1982, and the 42nd Venice Biennale in 1986. Major solo surveys of his work include Imants Tillers: works 1978 – 1988 at the Institute of Contemporary Arts, London (1988); Imants Tillers: 19301, at the National Art Gallery, Wellington (1989); Diaspora, National Art Museum, Riga, Latvia (1993); Diaspora in Context at the Pori Art Museum, Pori (1995); Towards Infinity: Works by Imants Tillers, Museum of Contemporary Art (MARCO) in Monterrey, Mexico (1999); and in 2006 a major retrospective of his work, Imants Tillers: one world many visions, was held at the National Gallery of Australia, Canberra. His works were exhibited again in Latvia in Journey to Nowhere at the National Museum of Art in 2018.

Tillers has also exhibited in numerous group exhibitions around the world, including An Australian Accent at PS1, New York (1984); Antipodean Currents at the Guggenheim Museum, Soho (1995); Australian Perspecta (1981,1987-89);" The Osaka Triennale of Painting" !990 The World Over/Under Capricorn: Art in the Age of Globalisation at the City Gallery, Wellington and Stedelijk Museum, Amsterdam (1996); the Biennale of Sydney (1979, 1986, 1988, and 2006); Kunst Nach Kunst (Art After Art), at the Neues Museum Weserburg, Germany (2003); and Prism, at the Bridgestone Museum of Art, Tokyo (2006).

A major retrospective of Tillers' work, titled Fierce Paradise: Conversations with Aboriginal Art, was held at the Museum Im Schafstall, Neuenstadt am Kocher, Germany, in 2026 (ending on 31 May). The exhibition included nine collaborations with Michael Nelson Jagamarra, as well as some paintings by Indigenous artists from the Tillers family collection, including by Jagamarra and Emily Kame Kngwarreye.

== Awards and commissions ==
Tillers has been the recipient of numerous awards and commissions, such as the Osaka Triennale Prize (Gold in 1993, Bronze in 1996, and Silver in 2001), the inaugural Beijing International Art Biennale Prize for Excellence (2003) and the Wynne Prize (2012 and 2013). He was the Archibald Prize finalist in 2013, 2016 and 2019.

Major commissions include the Federation Pavilion, Centennial Park (1985 – 87); the Founding Donors painting, Museum of Contemporary Art, Sydney (1991), and two key sculptures for Sydney Olympic Park (2002). Tillers has been a trustee of the Art Gallery of New South Wales since 2001. In 2005 he was awarded a Doctor of Letters honoris causa for "his long and distinguished contribution to the field of arts", by the University of New South Wales.

In 2015 Tillers was commissioned by the Australian War Memorial to design a commemorative tapestry on the 100th anniversary of the First World War. The tapestry, Avenue of Remembrance, also made reference to The Gallipoli Letter, written by Keith Murdoch to then Prime Minister Andrew Fisher, which is widely thought to have helped end the Gallipoli campaign.

In 2026, Tiller's painting In Truth was selected as a finalist in the Mandorla Art Award in Perth, and his painting Pikilyi was selected as a finalist in Hadley's Art Prize in Hobart, Tasmania.

== Collections ==
Tillers' work can be found in every Australian state gallery collection, the National Gallery of Australia and many regional collections. His works are also held many significant collections around the world, including the Metropolitan Museum of Art, New York, the Latvian National Museum of Art, Riga, the Pori Art Museum, Finland, Auckland Art Gallery Toi o Tāmaki, New Zealand and others.
