= Kilgour Prize =

Australian art award

The Kilgour Prize is an annual major non acquisitive art award administered by the Newcastle Art Gallery, in Australia. Established in 1987 through a bequest from artist Jack Noel Kilgour (1900–1987), an Australian landscape and portrait painter.

Judged by a panel of three judges, the competition focuses on figurative and portrait painting, and stipulates that entries use painting media including oil, acrylic, watercolour and/or mixed media. A$50,000 is awarded to the most outstanding work and a People's Choice Award is worth A$5,000 and is determined by public votes. The first competition was held in 2006.

In 2021, just under 500 works were received by the Newcastle Art Gallery from Australian artists for entry into the competition.

== Winners of Most Outstanding Work ==
- 2006 – Nicholas Harding with Beach Life
- 2008 – Dallas Bray with Burning Bush
- 2010 – Dallas Bray with Going to town
- 2014 – Alan Jones with Robert Forrester #2
- 2015 – Janelle Thomas with Helen Ross, 94 with Kirsty
- 2016 – Peter Gardiner with Origin
- 2017 – Cameron Stead with Between you and me
- 2018 – Natasha Walsh with Within the Studio (self–portrait)
- 2019 – Blak Douglas with Queen of her own stage (Ms Ursula Yovich)
- 2020 – Michael Bell with Starting The after party (Two self-portraits)
- 2021 – Lori Pensini with Family
