= Vincent Namatjira =

Australian Aboriginal artist (born 1983)

Vincent Namatjira OAM
- Born: 14 June 1983 (age 43); Alice Springs, Northern Territory, Australia
- Known for: Painting, portraiture
- Notable work: Three Legends (2017); Close Contact (2019); Stand Strong For Who You Are (2020)
- Awards: Ramsay Art Prize 2019; Archibald Prize 2020
- Website: www.iwantjaarts.com.au/artists/vincent-namatjira

Vincent Namatjira OAM (born 14 June 1983) is an Aboriginal Australian artist living in Indulkana, in the APY lands in South Australia. After being a finalist for the Archibald Prize three times, in 2020 he became the first Indigenous artist to win the prize for his work Stand strong for who you are, and his work selected as a finalist or winning entry in a number of other significant art awards. He is the great-grandson of the Arrente watercolour artist Albert Namatjira.

== Early life ==
Namatjira was born on 14 June 1983 in Alice Springs in the Northern Territory, and spent his early years in Hermannsburg. He is the great-grandson of renowned watercolour artist Albert Namatjira, and identifies as a Western Aranda man. After his mother, Jillian, died in 1991, Vincent and his sister were removed by the government and sent to foster homes in Perth, Western Australia, thousands of kilometres away.

Of this period, he has said that he felt lost and did not have good memories of childhood, especially as an adolescent. When he was 18, he travelled to Ntaria (Hermannsburg) to find his extended family. There, he reconnected with lost culture, language and country, and got involved with land management issues. During a trip through the Anangu Pitjantjatjara Yankunytjatjara, he met his wife, Natasha, and settled with her family at Kanpi.

In 2011, he was inspired to take up painting by Natasha and her father, Kunmanara (Jimmy) Pompey, both artists based at Iwantja Arts, an Aboriginal-owned and -operated centre in Indulkana.

He and his family visited Ntaria, where they studied his aunt, the late Elaine Namatjira (cited as Eileen), a leader of the Hermannsburg Potters, create artworks about their country. He also learnt more of the impact of his great-grandfather, Albert Namatjira.

== Career ==
Namatjira began painting in 2012 initially working on traditional dot paintings and taught by his wife Natasha. In 2013, he started painting portraits, starting with his great-grandfather Albert Namatjira. His work has been exhibited regularly since 2012.

His 2014 series, Albert's Story, tells the story of great-grandfather's life and reflects on his legacy. About the series, Namatjira said: "I hope my grandfather would be quite proud, maybe smiling down on me; because I won't let him go. I just keep carrying him on, his name and our families' stories". The series, which comprises 13 paintings, from "Being Initiated in the Bush" to "Albert Namatjira in Prison" to "Dies in Hospital, Broken Heart", is held by QAGOMA, and is available to view online. Artworks from the series were included in Namatjira's 2021 children's book, Albert Namatjira.

His entry for the 2016 TarraWarra Biennial, Endless circulation, comprised a series of portraits of the seven prime ministers who had been in power in Australia during his lifetime until that point.

Also in 2016, he painted a series of portraits of the seven wealthiest people in Australia, entitled The Richest, which has been shown in many exhibitions. The portraits include Blair Parry-Okeden, Gina Rinehart, Harry Triguboff, Frank Lowy, Anthony Pratt, James Packer and John Gandel.

Three Legends, Namatjira's entry for the National Aboriginal and Torres Strait Islander Art Awards (NATSIAA) in 2017, was a series of three portraits: David Unaipon, the first published Indigenous Australian writer; Jimmy Little, the first Indigenous performer to have a top 10 single; and Lionel Rose, the first Indigenous boxer to win a world title.

He has painted Donald Trump, whose birthday is on the same day as his own, several times.

In 2018 he painted Legends, a series of portraits of Aboriginal men which included singer Archie Roach, artist Gordon Bennett, land rights campaigner Eddie Mabo, and Australian Football League player Nicky Winmar, who famously lifted his football jersey and pointed at his skin when he was being racially vilified.

Close Contact (2019) is a double-sided portrait on plywood featuring a full-length Captain James Cook on one side and a full-length self-portrait on the other. This won the Ramsay Art Prize, and remains in the collection of the Art Gallery of South Australia.

Australia in Black and White (2019) features a series of 16 portraits drawn with ink on paper. The faces include those of media mogul Rupert Murdoch, former prime minister Julia Gillard, footballer and anti-racism campaigner Adam Goodes, as well as, once again, Albert Namatjira and Eddie Mabo.

In 2020 he again painted Goodes, this time with himself also in the portrait, entitled Stand strong for who you are. He said the inspiration had come from watching The Australian Dream, a documentary film about Goodes and the racism he endured on and off the field. This portrait won the Archibald Prize, making Namatjira the first Indigenous Australian artist to win the A$100,000 prize. It was painted in acrylic on linen, with Goodes depicted as "a proud Aboriginal man who stands strong for his people".

On 26 February 2021, a work originally commissioned by the Museum of Contemporary Art Australia in Sydney to coincide with the 250th anniversary of Captain Cook's arrival in Australia (2020) but delayed by the COVID-19 pandemic in Australia, was eventually unveiled. His largest work ever, P.P.F. (Past-Present-Future), extends 14 m (46 ft) by 9 m (30 ft) across a large wall known as the Circular Quay Foyer Wall in synthetic polymer paint. It features his father-in-law, Kunmanara (Jimmy) Pompey, next to an Aboriginal stockman on a horse; Adam Goodes; Lionel Rose, the first Aboriginal boxer to win a world title; Eddie Mabo and his Albert Namatjira. It also features himself:

This image is me pointing out to the Sydney Harbour, and I'm holding the Aboriginal flag. Here, the self-portrait brings the past and the present together, since I'm standing on the roof of my great-grandfather's famous green truck. It's past and present, and then pointing forward is like looking to the future; a strong, hopeful future for Indigenous Australians. The Aboriginal flag for me represents pride, resilience and recognition.

In August 2021, Namatjira's children's picture book about his grandfather, entitled Albert Namatjira, was published by Magabala Books. The artwork in the book was taken from the 2014 series Albert's Story. It was shortlisted in the 2022 Australian Book Industry Awards in the "Small Publishers' Children's Book of the Year" category.

In July 2022, as part of two festivals – Illuminate Adelaide and Tarnanthi – Namatjira created a huge animation to be projected each night for two weeks on the facade of the Art Gallery of South Australia, a work of public art entitled Going Out Bush. The animation includes elements of landscape from around Indulkana (his home) as well as Ntaria (home of his grandfather Albert), Toyota cars, and the Aboriginal flag. During the day, inside the gallery, his Archibald Prize-winning portrait of Adam Goodes is exhibited as part of a touring exhibition.

Vincent Namatjira has been represented by THIS IS NO FANTASY gallery in Melbourne, Australia, since 2014. The gallery has exhibited his work at numerous international art fairs including Art Basel Hong Kong, Art Basel Miami Beach, Art16 London, Sydney Contemporary and Melbourne Art Fair.

== Style and themes ==
Namatjira has said that while his great-grandfather's work has influenced him greatly, he has created his own distinctive style:

That's why I paint the way I paint, with acrylic, and he paints with watercolour. And I paint bold portraiture figuratives and modern, and he paints watercolour. He paints about the land; I paint about the people and the Country.

According to Bruce McLean, curator of Indigenous Australian art at QAGOMA, "Reconnecting with his history... had a massive impact on Vincent and [gave] his art a real impetus...". He also described Namatjira as "one of the leading lights of the emerging generation of artists from remote central Australia".

Namatjira's style is very bold, and his paintings have been described as caricatures, bordering on "outsider art". They often depict famous and powerful people standing alongside the artist, as if in a publicity shoot, with frequent references to Captain James Cook, the British royal family and contemporary Indigenous life. He has said that he is interested in people and their stories, and likes to use humour in his paintings. He has said that Cook, the 18th-century British explorer, is one of his favourite subjects, and it was one of his portraits of Cook that was purchased by the British Museum.

Although his portraits resemble caricature, according to the art historian Wes Hill they also have "a level of sophistication that only a colourist, not a satirist, could possess".

== Exhibitions ==
Namatjira's first solo exhibition was held in 2016.

His work has been exhibited at the British Museum (in Indigenous Australia: Enduring Civilisation, 2015); TarraWarra Museum of Art (TarraWarra Biennial, 2016); the Art Gallery of South Australia (Tarnanthi, 2017 & 2018); Art Basel Miami Beach (2018); Artspace Sydney, (Just Not Australian, 2018); Gallery of Modern Art, Brisbane (Asia Pacific Triennial, 2018); Australian Centre for Contemporary Art (ACCA), Melbourne (2018); Hazelhurst Regional Gallery and Arts Centre (2018), Warrnambool Art Gallery (2018) and Flinders University Museum of Art.

The exhibition at ACCA, A Lightness of Spirit is the Measure of Happiness, featured 10 specially commissioned works by Aboriginal artists of south-east Australia, including Namatjira, Robert Fielding, Yhonnie Scarce, Kaylene Whiskey and others.

In July–August 2022, his work was exhibited alongside that of Kaylene Whiskey and Tiger Yaltangki in an exhibition called Iwantja Rock n Roll at the Fort Gansevoort gallery in New York. The exhibition includes his five-part series of portraits of Queen Elizabeth II, entitled Elizabeth (on Country) (2021), in which the queen's face is juxtaposed with the Australian landscape.

Namatjira's first survey exhibition is part of the 2023 Tarnanthi art festival called Australia in Colour at the Art Gallery of South Australia (AGSA). It comprises over 100 works created between 2014 and 2023, including some new works along with more well-known ones, such as his portrait of Adam Goodes and Close Contact. A large installation called Australia in Colour comprises three rows of paintings each, of a diverse assortment of people including Ned Kelly, Jimi Hendrix, Scott Morrison, Julia Gillard, Gina Rinehart, Eddie Koiki Mabo, and Cathy Freeman, with his self-portrait in the centre. There are also several of Albert Namatjira's carvings and paintings from AGSA's collection included in the exhibition. The survey exhibition then transferred to the National Gallery of Australia, where the works are on display from 2 March until 21 July 2024. It was reported in May 2024 that mining billionaire Gina Rinehart objected to her portrait in the multi-portrait installation, and demanded that the painting be removed from display. The request originated with a group of 20 elite swimmers, led by Olympic gold medallist Kyle Chalmers and Kevin Hasemann, head of Swimming Queensland, who wrote to NGA director Nick Mitzevich, complaining about two of the many portraits of Rinehart created by Namatjira and hanging in the NGA. The National Association for the Visual Arts issued a statement asserting the importance of freedom of artistic expression, while Namatjira himself simply wrote:

I paint people who are wealthy, powerful, or significant – people who have had an influence on this country, and on me personally, whether directly or indirectly, whether for good or for bad. Some people might not like it, other people might find it funny, but I hope people look beneath the surface and see the serious side too.

== Collections ==
Namatjira's work is held in the British Museum, Art Gallery of New South Wales, Art Gallery of Western Australia, Art Gallery of South Australia and Queensland Art Gallery/Gallery of Modern Art.

== Awards and honours ==
On 8 June 2020, Namatjira was awarded a Medal of the Order of Australia (OAM) "in recognition of his service to Indigenous visual arts and the community", in the 2020 Queen's Birthday Honours.

His artwork has been selected as a finalist or winning entry in a number of significant art awards. A selection follows.

- Archibald Prize:
  - 2017: Shortlisted, Self-portrait on Friday
  - 2018: Highly Commended, Studio self-portrait
  - 2019: Finalist, Art is our weapon – portrait of Tony Albert
  - 2020: Winner, Archibald Prize, for Stand strong for who you are, featuring AFL player Adam Goodes and the artist
  - 2022: Finalist, Archibald Prize, Self-portrait with dingo
- Telstra National Aboriginal and Torres Strait Islander Art Awards:
  - 2013: Finalist
  - 2014: Finalist
  - 2016: Finalist
  - 2017: Finalist
  - 2018: Finalist
- 2013, 2015: Finalist, John Fries Award
- 2015: Finalist, Western Australian Indigenous Art Awards at the Art Gallery of Western Australia
- 2017: Invited finalist in the University of Queensland Art Museum's National Self-Portrait Prize
- 2018: Finalist, Alice Art Prize, for his painting of his great-grandfather Albert and the watercolour artist who influenced Albert's work, Rex Battarbee
- 2019: Winner, Ramsay Art Prize, for Close Contact; worth A$100,000, awarded by the Art Gallery of South Australia, open to Australian artists under 40 years old
- 2022: Finalist, Sulman Prize
- 2022: Sidney Myer Creative Fellowship, a tax-free grant of A$160,000 over two years
- 2023: South Australian Artist of the Year, SALIFE's Absolute Best Awards

== Publications ==
- Albert Namatjira. Magabala Books. 1 August 2021. ISBN 978-1-925936-21-6.

== Personal life ==
Namatjira is married to Natasha Pompey and they live at Indulkana with their children as of November 2021.

He enjoys music, especially rock and Australian country music, especially Slim Dusty, whom he has painted several times. He has also painted Archie Roach and Charlie Pride. He says "I love my rock. I listen to Deep Purple, Black Sabbath, AC/DC, Guns N' Roses, Nirvana, and Metallica while I paint. It puts me in my own world, and it blocks out everything". His nephew-in-law is guitarist Jeremy Whiskey who was a member of the Iwantja Band.

Awards
Preceded by Tony Costa	Archibald Prize; 2020 for Adam Goodes	Succeeded by Peter Wegner
