= Joan Ross =

Australian artist (born 1961)

Joan Ross (born in Glasgow, Scotland) is an Australian artist based in Sydney who works across a range of mediums including drawing, painting, installations, sculpture and video. Her work investigates the legacy of colonialism in Australia, particularly the effects colonialism has had on Indigenous Australians.

== Early life and education ==
Joan Ross was born in Glasgow, Scotland. She completed a Bachelor of Visual Arts degree at the City Art Institute and a Masters of Fine Arts, College of Fine Arts, at the University of New South Wales.

== Career ==
Ross has been exhibiting since the late 1980s. She has completed solo exhibitions at the Bett Gallery in Hobart and at Gallery Barry Keldoulis and the Michael Reid Gallery in Sydney as well as the Blue Mountains Cultural Centre in Katoomba.

Her work has featured in group exhibitions including Colonial Afterlives, Salamanca Arts Centre, Hobart (2015); South, Hazelhurst Regional Gallery, Gymea (2014); Australian Voices, Fine Art Society Contemporary, London (2013); Wonderland: New Contemporary Art from Australia, Museum of Contemporary Art, Taipei (2012); Lycett and Ross, Campbelltown Arts Centre, Campbelltown (2011); Curious Colony: A twenty first century Wunderkammer, Newcastle Regional Art Gallery, Newcastle (2010); I’m worst at what I do best, Parramatta Artist Studios, Sydney (2009); Lines in the Sand: Botany Bay Stories from 1770, Hazelhurst Regional Gallery, Sydney (2008); 2007: The Year in Art, S.H.Ervin Gallery, Sydney (2007).

Ross won the 2015 Glennfiddich Artists Residency Prize. She has been a finalist in the Woollahra Small Sculpture Prize, the Fremantle Print Prize and the Blake Prize for Religious Art in 2013. She won the Viewers' Choice Award, Redlands Westpac Art Prize, in 2012 and the Hazelhurst Art on Paper Award in 2005.

Her work, Oh history, you lied to me, won the 2017 Sir John Sulman Prize.

In 2019 Joan Ross presented Collectors Paradise at Michael Reid Gallery, Sydney; I give you a mountain, Bett Gallery, Hobart; Did you ask the river? Virtual Reality, Australian Centre for the Moving Image, Melbourne and at Sydney Contemporary, Carriageworks, Sydney.

In 2020 Ross prepared a hoarding commission We have sung the same song, for the Art Gallery of New South Wales, Sydney. Her Joan as a colonial woman looking at the future was selected as a finalist for the 2021 Archibald Prize, while ‘You were my biggest regret’: diary entry 1806 was similarly recognised in 2022.

== Work ==
Ross's work is held in the National Gallery of Australia in Canberra, the Museum of Contemporary Art in Sydney, and the Art Gallery of New South Wales in Sydney.
