= Fiona Lowry =

Australian artist (born 1974)

- Born: 1974 (age 51–52); Sydney, Australia
- Education: Sydney College of the Arts
- Known for: Painting
- Awards: Doug Moran National Portrait Prize; 2008 What I Assume You Shall Assume Fleurieu Art Prize; 2013 Alone With You Archibald Prize; 2014 Penelope Seidler

Fiona Lowry (born 1974) is an Australian painter who airbrushes pale colours to portray landscapes with people in them. The landscapes are beautiful and ambiguous, provoking the dangerous side of wilderness. Lowry also paints portraits and won the 2014 Archibald Prize at the Art Gallery of New South Wales with a portrait of Penelope Seidler. She is represented in the National Gallery of Australia, as well as the state galleries of Australia and in private collections.

== Early life ==
Lowry was born in Sydney (1974) and continues to work in Sydney. As a child she continually watched people and drew.

Lowry had a religious upbringing, and has told interviewers that she see the beauty and the foreboding in nature. This is reflected in her artworks.

Lowry completed a Bachelor of Visual Arts, Honours, at the Sydney College of the Arts.

== Career ==
Since 2001, Lowry has airbrushed her canvases in pale, monochromatic colours that create a sense of ambiguity with the harshness of some of her subjects. Often set in bushland/forest where historically bad events have occurred including massacres of Aboriginal people and murders, Lowry's work have a sense of danger or vulnerability.

In 2010 she had her first solo exhibition in Sydney. She was represented by Gallery Barry Keldouli in Sydney until 2010. Today Lowry is represented by Martin Browne Contemporary, Sydney.

Some of Lowry's landscapes include nude figures and in juxtapositions that are ambiguous—emotional or violent. These figures act out dramas in a modern wilderness setting. Her work's formal elements evoke beauty yet still harbour unease.

Lowry has also incorporated portraiture into her work, again focusing on the psychological. Some of her figures in the landscape are portraits.

In an interview Lowry noted that the Archibald Prize at the Art Gallery of New South Wales was her first experience of seeing art, and she wanted to be part of it. Lowry was a finalist in 2011 and 2013, and won the portraiture prize in 2016. with a portrait of Penelope Seidler. She had seen Seidler at an art exhibition and remarked on her beaury and presence. From that incident she wanted to paint her.

== Awards ==
Lowry was awarded the Doug Moran National Portrait Prize in 2008. The $100,000 portrait prize for her painting What I Assume You Shall Assume, was a naked self-portrait set in the Belanglo State Forest a scene of menace as the site of the backpacker murders.

She was the winner of the Fleurieu Art Prize in 2013 for her painting Alone With You.

In 2013 the painting also won the Wynn Prize for landscape at the Art Gallery of New South Wales. The painting was completed during her residency at Arthur Boyd's estate at Bundanon that Boyd left to the nation.

She was a finalist in the Archibald Prize in 2011, 2013, 2021 and 2022. She was the winner of the Archibald Prize in 2014 for her painting Penelope Seidler. In 2018, Fiona Lowry was awarded the $3000 Paddington Art Prize Honorable Mention for her work "My Mother's Far Embrace".

== Collections ==
Lowry is represented in the following collections

- National Gallery of Australia
- National Gallery of Victoria
- National Portrait Gallery
- Museum of Contemporary Art, Sydney

Awards
Preceded by Del Kathryn Barton	Archibald Prize; 2014 for Penelope Seidler	Succeeded by Nigel Milsom
