= Loribelle Spirovski =

Australian artist

- Born: 1990 (age 35–36); Manila, Philippines
- Education: University of New South Wales
- Known for: Portrait painting – (Surrealism and Photorealism)
- Website: loribellespirovski.com

Loribelle Spirovski (born 1990) is a visual artist who was born in Manila, Philippines and lives in Sydney, Australia. She is known for her portrait paintings, which often incorporate elements of surrealism and photorealism. She graduated from the University of New South Wales in 2012 with a Bachelor of Art Education, and has exhibited in Australia, Europe, the UK and the United States.

== Awards ==
Spirovski has been a finalist in the following art prizes:

- Archibald Prize – Art Gallery of NSW (2017, 2018, 2019)
- Portia Geach Memorial Award – S.H. Ervin Gallery (2018, 2019, 2020)
- The Lester Prize for Portraiture (2020)
