= Tony Costa (artist) =

Australian painter

- Born: 1955 (age 70–71); Sydney
- Education: UNSW Art & Design
- Partner: Jeannette Siebols
- Awards: Paddington Art Prize (2014), Archibald Prize (2019)

Tony Costa (born 1955) is an Australian painter. He won the Archibald Prize in 2019 for his portrait of artist Lindy Lee. His is married to painter Jeannette Siebols.

== Career ==
After high school, Costa initially studied law at University of New South Wales, before joining the Julian Ashton Art School where he met Hungarian painter Desiderius Orban. He returned to University of New South Wales as a post-graduate student of to study Art & Design, and after graduating, was selected to participate in the Triangle Artists Workshop in New York.

Costa entered and was a finalist in the Archibald Prize in 2015, 2017, and 2018, before winning in 2019. His painting of fellow artist Lindy Lee beat 50 other finalists for the $100,000 prize, and he has since earned greater recognition.

== Awards & Prizes ==
- 1979 Ashfield Prize (winner) Grand Valley, Victoria Pass
- 1988 Wynne Prize (finalist)
- 1999 Dobell prize for Drawing (finalist)
- 2001 Sulman prize (finalist)
- 2004 Dobell prize for Drawing (finalist)
- 2004 Doug Moran Prize for Portraiture (finalist)
- 2006 Adelaide Perry Prize for Drawing (finalist)
- 2007 Doug Moran Prize for Portraiture (finalist)
- 2008 Dobell prize for Drawing (finalist)
- 2009 Adelaide Perry Prize for Drawing (finalist)
- 2011 Doug Moran Prize for Portraiture (finalist)
- 2012 Dobell prize for Drawing (finalist)
- 2013 Kilgour Prize for Portraiture (finalist)
- 2014 Adelaide Perry Prize for Drawing (finalist)
- 2014 Paddington Art Prize (winner) Fallen Tree Port Hacking River R.N.P
- 2015 Doug Moran Prize for Portraiture (finalist)
- 2015 Adelaide Perry Prize for Drawing (finalist)
- 2015 Wynne Prize (finalist)
- 2015 Archibald Prize (finalist)
- 2016 Kilgour Prize for Portraiture (finalist)
- 2017 Archibald Prize (finalist)
- 2018 Archibald Prize (finalist)
- 2019 Adelaide Perry Prize for Drawing (finalist)
- 2019 Archibald Prize (winner)
- 2020 Kilgour Prize for Portraiture (finalist)

Awards
Preceded by Yvette Coppersmith	Archibald Prize; 2019 for Tony Costa	Succeeded by Vincent Namatjira
