= Kate Beynon =

Australian artist (born 1970)

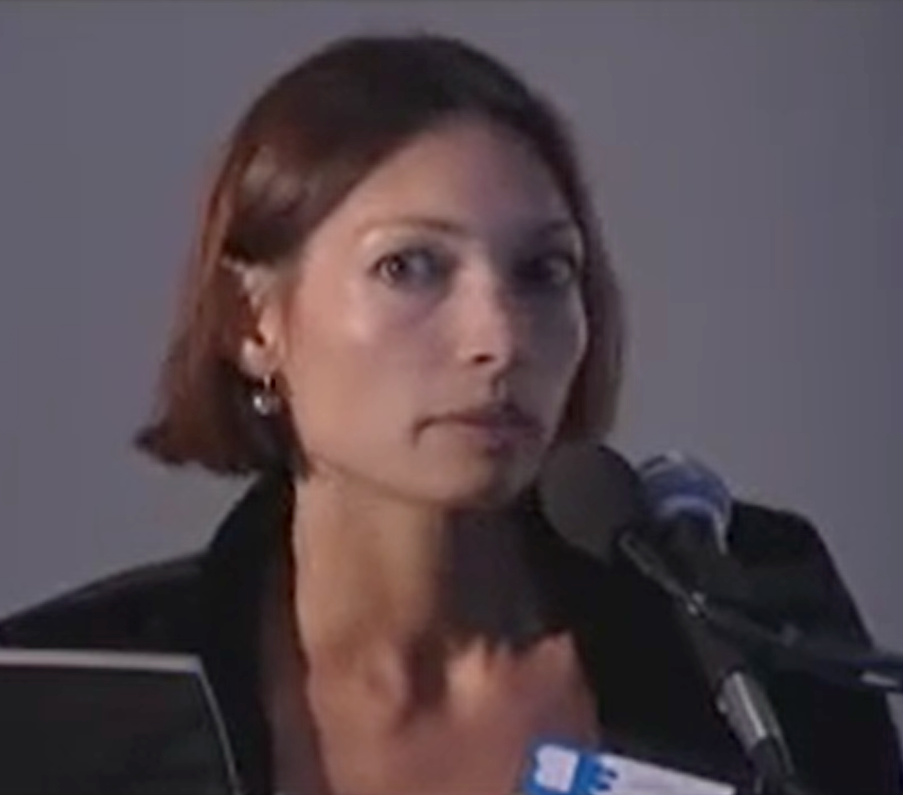
- At the Brooklyn Museum in 2007
- Born: 1970 (age 55–56); Hong Kong
- Education: Victorian College of the Arts
- Occupation: Artist

Kate Beynon (born 1970) is an Australian contemporary artist based in Melbourne.

== Early life and education ==
Beynon was born in 1970 to a Chinese–Malaysian mother and a Welsh father in Hong Kong. Her family emigrated from Hong Kong in 1974 and settled in Melbourne, Australia. She attended the University of Melbourne in 1989 and graduated from the Victorian College of the Arts in 1993 with a BFA.

== Art practice and career ==
Beynon's work addresses ideas of transcultural life, feminism, and notions of hybridity in today's world. She is known for her depictions of the Chinese heroine Li Ji, who is situated in a modern context. Through Li Ji, Beynon explores a hybrid Australian existence and a sense of belonging within a mixed and multi-layered identity.

Beynon has participated in-group exhibitions internationally and has held over 25 solo exhibitions. She has also participated in major feminist art shows, including Global Feminisms (2007) and The F–Word, Contemporary Feminist Art in Australia (2014). In 1995, Beynon travelled to Beijing to study Mandarin. While she was there, she discovered the story of Li Ji through a Chinese/English language textbook. In 2004, Beynon was awarded with the Professional Development Grant from the Visual arts funds of Australia council for a residency in Harlem, New York. She was also granted the Arts Victoria, International Program in 2012 to exhibit in India. Beynon has been an eight–time Archibald Prize finalist in 2006, 2010, 2011, 2012, 2014, 2016, 2017 and 2020.

Beynon is represented by Sutton Gallery in Melbourne, where she has been exhibiting since 1996, and Milani Gallery in Brisbane. Beynon's work is included in public collections across the world.

== Artwork ==
Having immigrated to Australia at the age of four, Beynon experienced a hybrid world of two cultures. Beynon's work is centered on her mixed heritage as an Australian with Welsh, English, Chinese, Malaysian, and Norwegian ancestry. Her art's narratives are inspired by ancient Chinese myths, which she adapts and situates in the modern world. At the start of her career, she experimented with Chinese calligraphy, questioning the notions of race and culture within her own family. Beynon also implements Eastern (manga) and Western comic book styles as a visual genre, and modern graffiti. Her interest in writing as an art form stems from her grandfather, who was a calligrapher and the last person in her family to read and write Chinese. Her first work, "the foolish old man moves the mountain", is a story taken from her grandfather's book.

=== Li Ji ===
Starting from 1996, Beynon's work revolved around a fictional character named Li Ji. The character is a heroine adapted from Chinese mythology, who has been transformed to examine hybridity and race. The myth itself is an ancient Chinese story written by Gan Bao, who recorded extraordinary feats imitating historical writing under the "strange tales" genre. The original story revolves around a young Chinese girl who steps out of her traditional, cultural role and saves her village by slaying a giant python. The art critic Maura Reilly states that through Li Ji, Beynon confronts issues about multiculturalism and immigration in contemporary Australian society. Beynon's work also tackles the modern issues of race and identity. In Where is Your Original Home (a video of Li–Ji journeying across a modern Melbourne Chinatown), Beynon explores the question asked to many non–Anglo Australians: "Where are you from?" She deconstructs how a conversational question can turn hostile caused by the underlying assumptions about belonging.

Beynon is also inspired by her personal experiences in other cultures. During her residency in Harlem, Beynon drew from the neighbourhood's styles and tastes and implemented them into her depictions of Li Ji (i.e. African hair braiding.) This transformation of Li Ji reflects her fluid, hybrid identity. Through this representation of Li Ji, Beynon explores issues of cultural identity and perceptions of race.

== Recognition and awards ==
- 2016: Geelong Contemporary Art Prize for the painting Graveyard scene/the beauty and sadness of bones

== Exhibitions ==
=== Solo ===
- 1993 Knots, Bats, Characters, Tala Gallery, Melbourne
- 1994 Kate Beynon, 1st Floor, Melbourne
- Li Ji, Sutton Gallery, Melbourne 1995 Old Story, 1st Floor, Melbourne
- 1996 Old Folktale, Bellas Gallery, Brisbane
- 1998 Intrinsic Defence, 200 Gertrude Street, Melbourne 1997 WHAT people, Sutton Gallery, Melbourne
- 1999 Happiness, Sutton Gallery, Melbourne Hope/Wish, Bellas Gallery, Brisbane
- 2000 Li Ji: Warrior Girl, Sutton Gallery, Melbourne Li Ji: Warrior Girl, Bellas Gallery, Brisbane
- Arts Centre, Sydney
- 2001 Chinese Calligraffiti, Studio 12, 200 Gertrude Street, Melbourne Li Ji: Warrior Girl, Gallery 4A, Asia-Australia
- Calligraffiti Wall, 1st Floor Artists' and Writers' Space, Melbourne
- Kate Beynon 1994–2002, Contemporary Art Centre of South Australia, Adelaide
- 2002 From the Dreams of Li Ji, Sutton Gallery, Melbourne
- Calligraffiti Wall, 1st Floor Artists' and Writers' Space, Melbourne
- From the Dreams of Li Ji, Sutton Gallery, Melbourne
- From the Lives of Li Ji, Bellas Gallery, Brisbane
- 2003 100 Forms of Happiness/From the Lives of Li Ji, Sutton Gallery, Melbourne
- Hybrid Life of Li Ji, Sutton Gallery, Melbourne
- 2005 Mixed Blood and Migratory Paths, The Physics Room, Christchurch, New Zealand 2004 Harlem to Noco: The
- 2006 Melbourne Art Fair, Sutton Gallery
- 2007 Espirito Transcultural/ Transcultural Spirit, Sutton Gallery, Melbourne
- 2008 Auspicious Charms for Transcultural Living, Level 2, Art Gallery of New South Wales, Sydney
- 2009 Transcultural Creatures, Milani Gallery, Brisbane
- 2010 Room of the Talismans, Sutton Gallery Project Space, Melbourne
- 2010 – Transcultural Icons, Sutton Gallery @ Depot, Sydney
- 2012 – Frida & Friends, Sutton Gallery, Melbourne
- 2015 – An-Li: A Chinese Ghost Tale, TarraWarra Museum of Art
- 2015 – Dance of the Spirits, Sutton Gallery, Melbourne

=== Group ===
- 1991 The Double Lucky Ho-Ho, with Wai-Ling Lai, Victorian College of the Arts, Melbourne
- Festival of Art – VCA at the Malthouse, The Malthouse, Melbourne
- 1992 Learning, curated by Jenny Zimmer and Gail Hastings, Monash Studios, Nextwave Festival, Melbourne
- Inside, with Maria Griffin and Megan Marshall, Victorian College of the Arts, Melbourne
- 1993 VCA Graduate Exhibition, Victorian College of the Arts, Melbourne
- 1st Floor Group Show Two, 1st Floor, Melbourne
- Read My Lips, curated by Shiralee Saul, M.R.C Ascent Gallery, Melbourne; and Union Gallery, Adelaide
- Intimate, with Maria Griffin and Megan Marshall, Nextwave Festival, Linden Gallery, Melbourne
- 1994 1st Floor Fundraiser Exhibition, 1st Floor, Melbourne
- Melbourne
- Kate Beynon, Maria Griffin, Megan Marshall, Jessica Rankin, Fringe Festival, 1st Floor,
- Floor, Melbourne
- 1995 Artist Editions, Sutton Gallery, Melbourne; and Bellas Gallery, Brisbane 1st Floor Fundraiser Exhibition, 1st
- S.W.I.M. Fundraiser, Project Space, RMIT, Melbourne
- Supermodels, Next Wave Festival, 1st Floor, Melbourne
- A Celebration: Recent Acquisitions of Heritage and Contemporary Art, Art Gallery of South Australia, Adelaide
- Adelaide Biennial of Australian Art, Art Gallery of South Australia, Adelaide
- Heirloom, Next Wave Festival, Monash University Gallery, Melbourne
- AERPHOST, The Debtors' Prison, Dublin, Ireland
- nationally
- Above and Beyond: Austral/Asian Interactions, Australian Centre for Contemporary Art, Melbourne; and touring
- Deacons Graham & James/Arts 21 Award, Ian Potter Gallery, The University of Melbourne
- 1996 Primavera 1996, Museum of Contemporary Art, Sydney
- 1st Floor Fundraiser, 1st Floor, Melbourne
- Now and Then, Bellas Gallery, Brisbane
- Moët & Chandon Exhibition, Queensland Art Gallery; and touring nationally Gallery 4A Fundraiser, Sydney
- 1997 Blackphoenix with Michael Pablo, 1st Floor, Melbourne
- Objectivity: International Objects of Subjectivity, Contemporary Art Centre of Virginia, USA
- 1st Floor Artists, The Physics Room, Christchurch, New Zealand
- Mr Big and Friends, Museum of Contemporary Art, Sydney
- Special Issue, 1st Floor, Melbourne
- 1998 The Expanded Field, Monash University Gallery, Melbourne Alter Point, 1st Floor, Melbourne
- Flux, Arts Victoria, Melbourne
- Look Again: Contemporary Prints and Drawings from the Collection, National Gallery of Victoria, Melbourne
- Caldwell House Gallery, Chijmes, Singapore
- Diaphanous, Span Gallery, Melbourne; and Nokia Singapore Arts Festival,
- The Queen is Dead, Stills Gallery, Edinburgh, Scotland
- Facsimile, curated by Stuart Koop, LAC Gallery, Venezuela
- 1999 Perspecta 99, Talkback: Living Here Now – Art & Politics, Art Gallery of New South Wales, Sydney
- Facsimile, Plimsoll Gallery, Hobart; and Bendigo Art Gallery, Victoria
- Gertrude Street Studio Artists 2000, 200 Gertrude Street, Melbourne
- Rent, Australian Centre for Contemporary Art, Melbourne; and Overgaden Gallery, Copenhagen, Denmark
- 2000 Pragmatics of Inscription: Wall Drawings, Linden Gallery, Melbourne
- 1st Floor Fundraiser, 1st Floor, Melbourne
- Bellas Gallery Group Exhibition, Bellas Gallery, Brisbane
- STOP/FRAME, New England Regional Art Museum, Armidale, New South Wales CACSA Fundraiser, Contemporary Art Centre of South Australia, Adelaide
- Gertrude Studio Artists 2001, 200 Gertrude Street, Melbourne
- MCA Unpacked, Museum of Contemporary Art, Sydney
- Paperworks: Australian artists exploring drawing and the printed image, Queensland Art Gallery, Brisbane
- Asia in Australia: Beyond Orientalism, QUT Art Museum, Brisbane
- Short Soup; Sydney Asia Pacific Film Festival, Sydney
- 31st Alice Prize, Araluen Centre, Alice Springs
- hybrid<life>forms: Australian New Media Art, Netherlands Media Art Institute, Amsterdam, the Netherlands
- 2001 Our Place: Issues of Identity in Recent Australian Art, Monash University in Prato, Palazzo Vaj, Italy
- Watching Ocean and Sky Together, Fourth Wall Liverpool, Liverpool Biennial, presented by The Public Art Development Trust, London, UK
- City of Hobart Art Prize, Tasmanian Art Gallery and Museum, Hobart
- No Worries! – Mai Pen Rai! Art From Australia and Thailand, Monash University Museum of Art, Melbourne
- Tales of the Unexpected, National Gallery of Australia, Canberra
- Monash University Museum of Art, Melbourne.
- Energy Fields: Selected Installations from the Monash University Collection,
- Fieldwork: Australian Art 1968 – 2002, The Ian Potter Centre: National Gallery of Victoria, Melbourne
- 2002 Upstream: 400 Years of the Dutch East Indies Company, Australian Representative, Amsterdam and Hoorn, The Netherlands
- The Arthur Guy Memorial Painting Prize, Bendigo Art Gallery, Victoria
- See Here Now: Vizard Foundation Art Collection of the 1990s, Ian Potter Museum of Art, The University of Melbourne
- The Future in Every Direction: Joan Clemenger Endowment for Contemporary Australian Art, The Ian Potter Centre: National Gallery of Victoria, Melbourne
- 2003 Synergies, Drill Hall, Australian National University, Canberra
- Curriculum Vitae 2016 – 2 –
- The Plot Thickens: Narratives in Australian Art, Heide Museum of Modern Art, Melbourne Home & Away: Place & Identity in Recent Australian Art, Faculty Gallery of Art & Design, Monash University, Melbourne
- Australia Response Gallery, Melbourne
- The Plot Thickens: Narratives in Australian Art, Heide Museum of Modern Art, Melbourne Home & Away: Place & Identity in Recent Australian Art, Faculty Gallery of Art & Design, Monash University, Melbourne
- Australia Response Gallery, Melbourne
- 2004 Xin Nian: Contemporary Chinese Australian Art, The Ian Potter Centre: National Gallery of Victoria, Melbourne
- Art for Science- fundraiser for Murdoch Children's Research Institute, Nellie Castan Gallery, Melbourne
- The Plot Thickens: Narratives in Australian Art, Ballarat Fine Art Gallery, Victoria
- Unscripted, Art Gallery of New South Wales, Sydney
- 200 Gertrude Street, Melbourne
- A Short Ride in a Fast Machine, Gertrude Contemporary Art Spaces 1985–2005,
- MCA Collection: New Acquisitions in Context, Museum of Contemporary Art, Sydney
- Pitch Your Own Tent: Art Projects/ Store 5/ 1st Floor, Monash University Museum of Art, Melbourne
- Identity and Desire, Art Gallery of South Australia, Adelaide
- 2005 C'town Bling: art and the youth demografik, Campbelltown Arts Centre, Sydney
- Meeting Place, Keeping Place, George Adams Gallery, Victorian Arts Centre, Melbourne
- Extra Aesthetic: 25 Views of the Monash University Collection, Monash University Museum of Art, Melbourne
- The 2006 Archibald Prize, Art Gallery of New South Wales, Sydney; Myer Mural Hall, Melbourne; and touring
- by Victoria Lynn, TarraWarra Museum, Yarra Valley, Victoria
- 2006 TarraWarra Biennial 2006 – Parallel Lives: Australian Painting Today, curated
- Gallery, Victoria
- Eye to I: the face in recent art, curated by Geoffrey Wallis, Ballarat Art
- Heading North – Contemporary Asian Artists of Australia, Maroondah Art Gallery, Victoria
- SHIFT: places changing, Lake Macquarie City Art Gallery, New South Wales
- 2007 Global Feminisms, Brooklyn Museum of Art, New York, USA

== Collections ==
- American University, Washington DC, USA Artbank, Sydney
- Art Gallery of New South Wales, Sydney Art Gallery of South Australia, Adelaide
- Art Gallery of Western Australia, Perth
- The Australia Council, the Federal Government's art funding and advisory body, Sydney Bendigo Art Gallery, Victoria
- BHP Billiton, Melbourne
- Curtin University, Perth
- Goldman Sachs JB Were, Sydney
- Griffith University, Brisbane
- Hamilton Art Gallery, Hamilton, Victoria
- Holmesglen Institute of TAFE, Melbourne
- Mercer Collection, Melbourne
- Michael and Janet Buxton Collection, Melbourne
- Monash University Collection, Melbourne
- Museum of Contemporary Art, Sydney
- The Museum of Modern Art (MMK), Frankfurt, Germany
- National Gallery of Australia, Canberra
- National Gallery of Victoria, Melbourne
- UQ Art Museum, Brisbane
- Queensland Art Gallery, Brisbane
- Vizard Foundation, The University of Melbourne
- Wesley Hospital, Brisbane
- Private collections in Australia, New Zealand and USA
