= Iluwanti Ken =

Aborginal Australian artist (born 1944)

Iluwanti Ken (born 1944) is an Aboriginal Australian artist, ngangkari, and elder of the Pitjantjatjara people.

== Early life ==
Iluwanti Ken was born in 1944 in Watarru, South Australia.

== Career ==
Ken was a co-founder of the APY Art Centre Collective (APYACC), which comprises artists and art centres from the Aṉangu Pitjantjatjara Yankunytjatjara (APY Lands) in South Australia.

She works at Tjala Arts in Amata, in the APY. She is known for her large-scale, monochromatic drawings of Tjilpul, or eagles. They are drawn in ink using punu (sticks).

In 2026 Ken co-created a sculpture titled manngu palapai ngura tjanampa ("Mother Eagle makes a nest and home") with fellow artists LeShaye Swan and Justine Anderson, made from clay, fibre, emu feathers, and wood. Ken carved the wooden pot, while Swan created the clay component and Anderson helped with the weaving. Ken explained that the work is a cultural story: "It is the story of the mother and father hunting for mai (food) and creating a shelter so their tjitji (children) can grow strong. This pot is tjitji ngura manngu — the children's nest and home".

Artist Richard Lewer, who first met Ken through a gallery in Brisbane around 2020, and whose portrait of her won the 2026 Archibald Prize, described the use of birds in her work "as teachers of care, protection, provision and resilience, particularly for women and children". He described Ken as having a "quiet authority" – "an ability to command a space with a sense of calm attentiveness".

== Other activities ==
Apart from her art, Ken is also a traditional healer, or ngangkari, and elder of the Pitjantjatjara people. She is a director of the board of Tjala Arts and also works for the NPY Women's Council.

== Recognition and awards ==
Ken is the subject of the winning entry of the 2026 Archibald Prize, by Richard Lewer.

Ken has been a finalist or winner of a number of art awards, including:

- 2020: Winner, 37th Telstra NATSIAA Works on Paper Award
- 2021 & 2023: Finalist, Dobell Drawing Prize
- 2026: Finalist, Wynne Prize, for manngu palapai ngura tjanampa
- 2026: Finalist, 43rd Telstra NATSIAAs, General Painting Award category

== Exhibitions ==
In 2012, Ken's work was displayed in a large exhibition of women artists' work, titled Contemporary Australia: Women, at Queensland Art Gallery: Gallery of Modern Art, Brisbane.

In 2020, several of Ken's works were displayed as part of Tarnanthi Open Hands, at the Art Gallery of South Australia.

== Collections ==
Ken's work is held by many major galleries, including:

- Art Gallery of New South Wales
- Art Gallery of South Australia
- Artbank
- National Gallery of Victoria
- QAGOMA
- Singapore Art Museum
