= Belynda Henry =

Australian artist

- Born: New South Wales
- Occupations: Painter, artist
- Years active: 1994–present
- Website: www.belyndahenry.com

Belynda Henry as a multiple Wynne and Archibald prize finalist is one of Australia’s leading landscape painters. She is also a member of Australian Watercolour Society.

== Reception ==
Henry is known for her 'evocative paintings' and her works have been exhibited over 30 solo shows. The Age recently included her in the feature story, ‘Seven Artists You Should Invest in Now’. In 2019 Henry has been featured in Thames & Hudson’s tome, ‘A Painted Landscape’ – featuring the works of landscape artists including, Elizabeth Cummings, John Olsen, Ann Thompson, Rick Amor among other notable landscape painters. Most recently in a sell-out show in New York, a majority of her works were acquired by style arbiter and collector Christian Louboutin.

== Notable works ==
In 2020 Henry's solo exhibition at the Australian Galleries featured the sounds of recorded bird calls from around the artist's studio as well as a suspended sculptural installation by floral artist Tracey Deep. The exhibition To Paint Is To Love was reported to be a 'sensory and immersive experience' for the audiences as Vogue mentioned, "Henry is creating an immersive show that will capture the sounds and sights of her rural Central Coast studio to give visitors a sense of where her pieces are formed and how she works".

== Selected solo exhibitions ==
- 2020 ‘to paint is to love’, Australian Galleries, Sydney
- 2020 ‘The Space Between’, Olsen Gruin, New York
- 2019 ‘Waterfalls and Waterholes’, Australian Galleries, Sydney
- 2019 ‘Reflections’, Flinders Lane Gallery, Melbourne
- 2018 ‘Landscape Lines’, Australian Galleries, Sydney
- 2017 ‘Wanderer’, Flinders Lane Gallery, Melbourne
- 2016 ‘Distance’, Flinders Lane Gallery, Melbourne
- 2016 ‘Living colour’, Olsen Irwin Works on Paper, Small Paintings and Sculpture, Sydney
- 2016 ‘Mountain Sky’, The Design Files, Sydney
- 2016 Flinders Lane Gallery, Melbourne
- 2015 ‘Higher’, Koskela, Sydney
- 2014 ‘Open House’, The Design Files, Melbourne
- 2014 ‘Overgrown’, The Design Files, Melbourne
- 2014 ‘Jigsaw’, Anthea Polson Art, Main Beach, QLD
- 2012 ‘Colour My World – New Sculptures and Paintings’, Richard Martin Art, Sydney
- 2010 ‘Overview’, Richard Martin Art, Sydney
- 2007 ‘Shimmer’, Greenhill Galleries, Perth
- 2007 ‘Shadows of Nature’, Richard Martin Art, Sydney
- 2006 ‘Recent Paintings’, Libby Edwards Galleries, Brisbane
- 2005 ‘Life and Paddocks’, Richard Martin Art, Sydney
- 2005 ‘New Paintings’, Gallery 460, Green Point, NSW
- 2005 ‘Driving’, Libby Edwards Galleries, Sydney
- 2004 ‘Still Life Paintings’, Libby Edwards Galleries, Melbourne
- 2004 ‘New Paintings’, Greenhill Galleries, Adelaide
- 2004‘New Paintings’, Greenhill Galleries, Perth
- 2003 Libby Edwards Galleries, Sydney
- 2002 Libby Edwards Galleries, Melbourne
- 2002 ‘Paddock Lines’, Greenhill Galleries, Adelaide
- 2001 ‘Floating Over Paddocks’, Von Bertouch Galleries, Newcastle, NSW
- 2001 ‘Light and Paddocks’, Avoca Fine Arts Gallery, Avoca, NSW
- 1999 ‘Love, Light and Paddocks’, Avoca Fine Arts Gallery, Avoca, NSW
- 1996 ‘And Anywhere Is’, Avoca Fine Arts Gallery, Avoca, NSW
- 1994 ‘Playing in the Secret Garden’, Avoca Fine Arts Gallery, Avoca, NSW

== Sources ==
- Art Almanac, April 2014, p. 54
- Feagins Lucy; "Jigsaw", The Design Files, March 2014
- Giles Auty; "After the Bald was over", The Weekend Australian, March 2000
- McClelland, Anna: “Celebrated artist Belynda Henry exhibits at Koskela”, Buro 24/7, March 2015
- Parker Loni; "Autumn Colours", Adore Home Magazine, March 2014
- Style curator, October 2014
- Vogue Living, July – August 2018, p. 36
- Vogue, July 2018, p. 76 – 77
- "Works on paper", Inside Out Magazine, August 2014, p. 40
