= Marikit Santiago =

Filipina-Australian artist

Marikit Santiago (born 1985) is a Filipina-Australian artist and winner of the 2020 Sir John Sulman Prize.

Santiago was born in Melbourne in 1985. She studied at the University of New South Wales, initially graduating with a Bachelor of Medical Science. She later completed Bachelor of Fine Arts for which she received the Dean's Award for Academic Excellence. She followed this with a Master of Fine Arts, this time winning an Australian Postgraduate Award.

Santiago's work has been said to "collapse the categories of the personal and the political, exploring how experiences of motherhood and marriage sit within broader historical constructs, including colonialism and organised faith" and "investigates a personal conflict of cultural plurality at the conjunction of Filipino ethnicity and Australian nationality."

Santiago was a 2016 Archibald Prize finalist for her work Blacklustre, a portrait of fellow artist Ramesh Mario Nithiyendran. She was awarded the 2020 Sulman Prize for her work The divine. Filipiniana (self-portrait in collaboration with Maella Santiago Pearl) was one of the 2021 Archibald Prize finalists.

Santiago has a studio in Parramatta. She has three children, who often contribute to her artwork.
