= Richard Lewer =

Australian painter

Richard Lewer (born 1970) is an Australian visual artist. He works mainly with painting and word art, but has also created installations using sound and video recordings and stills. He has won several major art prizes, including the Wallace Art Award in 2008, the Blake Prize for Religious Art in 2014, and the Basil Sellers Art Prize in 2016. He was awarded the 2026 Archibald Prize, having been a finalist for his portraits on three previous occasions.

== Early life and education ==
Richard Lewer was born in Hamilton, New Zealand, in 1970. He was brought up in the Catholic religion, and religion became an influence on his art works.

He completed a Bachelor of Fine Art at Elam School of Fine Arts at Auckland University from 1989 to 1992. He also holds a Master of Visual Arts, Victorian College of the Arts, from the University of Melbourne, 2000.

== Career ==
Lewer has exhibited regularly in Australia and New Zealand since the 1990s. He moved to Melbourne around 1996, and relocated to Perth, Western Australia, in 2012 after being awarded a three-year residency at the Fremantle Arts Centre.

For an exhibition at the Hugo Michell Gallery in Adelaide, with whom he started working around 2008, he created a series of works based around the Ten Commandments.

In 2024, the National Gallery of Australia in Canberra acquired Steve, an animated film comprising thousands of paintings created by Lewer during 2023-2024. The animation tells the story of Steve and his family as he develops dementia.

=== Art practice ===
Lewer works mainly with painting, often incorporating text in his works. He has been described himself as a social realist, largely driven by a desire to explain patterns and connections within crime, sport, and religion.

After his residence in New York in 2010, he created an installation for the Orexart stand at the Melbourne Art Fair, which comprised rebuilding his studio, with text all over the walls, and a sound recording of the NYPD police radio.

He said in 2013: "I guess I am drawn to the extreme, whether it's crime, sport, or religion". According to Phip Murray, "These big themes are, however, abstracted in both form and content to make them interestingly idiosyncratic and poetically resonant. A compelling aspect of Lewer's work is the tension between the literal and the poetic. He is in part a social realist, faithfully documenting suburban life, yet his paintings also evoke other, more ethereal and lyrical ideas". In 2026, he described himself as a storyteller, who never prepares for a painting.

== Awards and prizes ==
Lewer won the Wallace Art Award in 2008 for a painting from a series called Skill, Discipline, Training.

In 2009, he won the Maddocks Venice Art Award, which funded a study tour of the 2009 Venice Biennale.

In 2014, he was the 63rd recipient of the Blake Prize for Religious Art for his media work Worse Luck I’m Still Here.

Lewer was the winner of the Basil Sellers Art Prize in 2016, with his submission of a series of oil paintings titled The Theatre of Sports. The work comprised 12 paintings, showing some "public moments of failure experienced by sporting heroes". This was the fifth and final award in the series; Lewers had previously been a finalist in the biennial award, in 2008 and 2010.

He was an Archibald Prize finalist in 2017, 2021 and 2022.

Lewer was awarded the 2026 Archibald Prize for his synthetic polymer paint on canvas portrait of Iluwanti Ken, an Aboriginal artist, ngangkari (traditional healer), and elder, who co-founded the APY Art Centre Collective.

Other awards include:

- 2010: National Works on Paper Drawing Award, Mornington Peninsula, Victoria
- 2013: Black Swan Portraiture Award, Perth
- 2015: Albany Art Award, Albany, WA

== Residencies ==
Lewer was artist in residence at Colin McCahon House Trust in Titirangi, Auckland, New Zealand, in 2008, followed by a residency at Gertrude Contemporary in Melbourne from 2008 until 2010.

In 2010, he completed a six-month artist's residency with the International Studio & Curatorial Program (ISCP) in Brooklyn, New York, where he based his art works on listing to the NYPD police radio channels. He used the overheard conversations to create text art.

From 2012 to 2013 he was artist in residence at the Fremantle Arts Centre in Fremantle.

In 2014 Lewer was artist in residence with the Parnngurr Community (Martumili artists), Western desert, Western Australia.

in 2016, he undertook a residency at Vancouver Arts Centre in Albany, Western Australia.

== Other activities ==
Lewer has said that sport has always played an important part in his life, and that his personal mantra was "Skill, Discipline and Training" applied to both his art and his sporting activities.

From 2001 he was a member of the Northside Boxing Club in Preston in Melbourne, where he trained three times a week, later holding committee and trainer positions at the club. He was also a member of the Royal Park Tennis Club in Melbourne until 2012, when he moved to Fremantle. He became a member of the Fremantle Lawn Tennis Club and Gloveworkx Boxing Fitness Gym, and also surfed regularly there.

== Selected exhibitions ==
=== Solo ===
Lewer's solo exhibitions have included:

- Nobody likes a Show-Off, Monash University Museum of Art (2009)
- 10 Days in Gunbalanya, Hugo Michell Gallery, Adelaide (2009)
- I Must Learn To Like Myself, Waikato Museum, Hamilton, New Zealand (2010)
- The Sound of Your Own Breathing, Hugo Michell Gallery, Adelaide (2010)
- New York Stories, Melbourne International Art Fair
- OREX Gallery, Auckland (2010)
- Safe Travels, Fehily Contemporary, Melbourne (2011)
- Painters and Dockers, Hugo Michell Gallery, Adelaide (2011)
- I Only Talk to God When I Want Something, Geelong Gallery (2026)

=== Group ===
Lewer's work has also been exhibited in a number of group exhibitions, including at the National Gallery of Victoria (2011 and 2012); Perth Institute of Contemporary Arts (2012); Heide Museum of Modern Art (2010); Museum of Contemporary Art, Sydney (2009); and the Basil Sellers Art Prize at the Ian Potter Museum of Art (2010 and 2008).

== Collections ==
Lewer's work is held by many major galleries, including:

- Museum of Contemporary Art
- Art Gallery of New South Wales
- Art Gallery of South Australia
- Monash University Museum of Art
- Ian Potter Museum of Art
- Museum of New Zealand Te Papa Tongarewa
- National Gallery of Australia
- National Gallery of Victoria
- University of Auckland
- University of Waikato
- Victoria University, Wellington
- Waikato Museum

Awards
Preceded by Julie Fragar	Archibald Prize; 2026 for Iluwanti Ken	Incumbent
