= Tsering Hannaford =

South Australian artist

- Education: University of Adelaide
- Known for: painting

Tsering Hannaford is an Australian artist. In 2012 Tsering and her father Robert Hannaford were the "first father and daughter to show concurrently in Salon des Refusés, an exhibition of Archibald entries", and in 2015 they were the first father and daughter selected as finalists for the Archibald Prize. Tsering is a great-great-great-great-granddaughter of Susannah Hannaford.

== Early life and education ==
Tsering Hannaford was born to shoemaker Shirley Andris and artist Robert Hannaford, who were living in West Hindmarsh. Also in 1987, Robert Hannaford bought a disused farmhouse and outbuildings at Peters Hill in the Mid North of South Australia near Riverton and converted them into a house and studio.

Tsering grew up in Riverton and West Hindmarsh, and was educated at the University of Adelaide where she was awarded a Bachelor of Arts in Psychology in 2008 and a Graduate Diploma in Art History in 2011.

== Career ==
Tsering Hannaford has been painting since infancy; at age four her father set up a studio for her. However, she also has had many other interests.

After finishing at University, Hannaford concentrated on painting. She specializes in portraiture, landscapes and still life painting. She became a full time artist in 2012.

She has been a finalist in the Portia Geach Memorial Award three times (highly commended in 2014), a finalist in the A.M.E. Bale Travelling Scholarship and Art Prize, a semi-finalist in the Doug Moran National Portrait Prize, and hung twice (2012 & 2013) in the Archibald Salon des Refusés.

She was an Archibald Prize finalist in 2015, 2016, 2017, 2018, 2019, 2020 and 2021.

== Recognition ==
- 2012 – Archibald Salon des Refusés – Self-portrait
- 2012 – A.M.E Bale Art Prize (finalist)
- 2013 – Archibald Prize Salon des Refusés – Self-portrait
- 2013 – Portia Geach Memorial Award (finalist)
- 2013 – Inaugural RSASA Portrait Prize (finalist)
- 2013 – Helpmann Academy Emerging Artist Award (Winner)
- 2014 – Eran Svigos Award for Best Visual Art Adelaide Fringe (Winner)
- 2014 – Inaugural Kennedy Art Prize (finalist)
- 2014 – Portia Geach Memorial Award (finalist – Highly Commended)
- 2014 – A.M.E Bale Art Prize (finalist)
- 2014 – Doug Moran National Portrait Prize (Semi-finalist)
- 2015 – Lethbridge 10,000 Small Scale Art Award (finalist)
- 2015 – RSASA Biennial Portrait Prize (finalist)
- 2015 – Archibald Prize finalist – Objet démodé
- 2015 – Portia Geach Memorial Award finalist – Portrait of Julia Townsend
- 2016 – "Works from New York City" Exhibition – Kyle
- 2016 – Archibald Prize finalist – Self-portrait with magnolia
- 2017 – Archibald Prize finalist – Self-portrait
- 2018 – Archibald Prize finalist – Self-portrait
- 2019 – Archibald Prize finalist – Mrs Singh (Portrait of Anant Singh)
- 2020 – Archibald Prize finalist – Self-portrait after 'Allegory of Painting'
- 2021 – Archibald Prize finalist – Her Excellency the Honourable Margaret Beazley AC QC
- 2022 – Archibald Prize finalist – Sally Scales
- 2024 – Archibald Prize finalists – Meditation on seeing (portrait of Dad)
- 2025 – Archibald Prize finalist – Meditation on time (a left-handed self-portrait)
