= Louise Hearman =

Australian artist (born 1963)

Louise Hearman (born 1963) is an Australian artist from Melbourne who has been painting and drawing from a very young age. She mostly paints with oil on masonite, though she does work with pastel and charcoal from time to time.

== Education ==
At high school level she attended Tintern Church of England Girls Grammar School in Ringwood in East Victoria where she showed much ability in her art classes. She attended Victorian College of the Arts from 1982–1984.

== Life and career ==
Hearman first came to public notice in 1986 when she spent a year painting a mural on the inside of the concrete dome of the old gymnasium at the Missions to Seamen building in Flinders Street in Melbourne. The premises also served as her studio at that time.

In 1991, her work was exhibited at Australian National University's Drill Hall Gallery in a solo show, "The corpreal body", whilst in 1993 she was chosen by the curators for that year's Australia Perspecta exhibition. Her work next gained recognition through an appearance on the short-list for the 1999 Contempora 5 award, whilst in both 2000 and 2005 she was exhibited at the National Gallery of Australia; in 2000 appearing in the "Uncommon World; Aspects of Contemporary Australian Art" exhibition which ran from 15 July until 22 Oct; and in 2005 within the "Big Spooks" exhibition. In 2007 her piece Untitled #1158 was chosen for exhibition as part of the city of Sydney's Open Gallery exhibition, which described the roster of artists chosen as representing "leading Australian and international artists".

Her portrait, Bill-1383, won the 2014 Doug Moran National Portrait Prize; while in 2016, she won the Archibald Prize for her portrait of entertainer, satirist, painter and Dadaist, Barry Humphries.

== Influences ==
Growing up in suburban Croydon, Hearman took to painting and drawing at a young age. As a child she had limited ability to travel, so her initial subjects were the landscape around her. Landscapes have subsequently formed the basis of many of her works.

Clarice Beckett has been identified by Australian arts writer, critic and broadcaster Bruce James as a possible influence on Hearman, James writing in The Sydney Morning Herald in 2002 that "Hearman's interest in uncanny situations and mind states can surely trace its pedigree back to Beckett's twilight zone.".

There has been some speculation that Hearman was influenced by the television show The X-Files. Hearman denies this, stating that she watches very little television, and has not seen the series.

Awards
Preceded by Nigel Milsom	Archibald Prize; 2016 for Barry Humphries	Succeeded by Mitch Cairns
