= Guy Warren (artist) =

Australian painter (1921–2024)

Guy Warren AM
- Born: Guy Wilkie Warren; 16 April 1921; Goulburn, New South Wales, Australia
- Died: 14 June 2024 (aged 103)
- Occupation: Painter
- Known for: Winning the 1985 Archibald Prize
- Notable work: Flugelman with Wingman

Guy Wilkie Warren AM (16 April 1921 – 14 June 2024) was an Australian painter who won the Archibald Prize in 1985 with Flugelman with Wingman. His works have also been exhibited as finalists in the Dobell Prize and he received the Trustees Watercolour Award at the Wynne Prize in 1980.

== Military service ==
Warren served in the Australian Army during World War II from 15 May 1941 until 3 April 1946. During his service outside Australia in New Guinea and Bougainville Island with the 136 Advance Supply Depot he rose to the rank of Staff Sergeant.

Many of Warren's creative influences can be traced to his Army service, especially his service in southeast Queensland.

== Artistic career ==
At the end of World War II, Warren undertook art training at the National Art School. During this time, he met other veteran artists who had also served in World War II, and who took advantage of the British Commonwealth's post-war training scheme. On completing this program, he travelled to England to pursue landscape painting where a chance meeting with a young veteran and naturalist, Sir David Attenborough, provided the opportunity to continue his passion for the jungle through photos Attenborough provided from his own travels to New Guinea.

Warren's work has been the subject of numerous solo exhibitions. In 2016, the S. H. Ervin Gallery held Genesis of a painter: Guy Warren at 95, which focused on works from the 1950s and 60s together with works painted late in his life. The intention of the exhibition was to show his "enduring imagery of the relationship between the figure and background". At least two exhibitions were held at the time of his hundredth birthday, From the Mountain to the Sky, held by the National Art School; and Hills and Wings: A Celebration of Guy Warren and his Work, at the University of Wollongong, where he was previously the director of the University's art collection.

=== Modeling ===
Warren was a sitter for portraits on several occasions, including for four or five artists painting for Australia's premier portraiture competition, the Archibald Prize. In the early 2000s he posed for Ann Cape, for her work Figure within the landscape: Guy Warren, that hung in the 2004 prize exhibition. Then in 2021, the 100th year of the Archibald Prize, painter Peter Wegner won the award for his portrait of Warren – who was, like the prize, in his hundredth year.

Warren sat for his portrait for the Australian National Veterans Arts Museum’s (ANVAM) photographic portrait series, Persona: Contemporary Veteran Artists, in 2020. The curator was ANVAM founder, Tanja Johnston, and the photographer Michael Christofas.

== Death ==
Warren died on 14 June 2024, at the age of 103.

== Honours and awards ==
Warren was awarded the Medal of the Order of Australia in 1999 and was made a Member of the Order of Australia for "significant service to the visual arts as a painter, teacher, mentor and competition judge" in 2014.

Awards
Preceded by Keith Looby	Archibald Prize; 1985 for Flugelman with Wingman	Succeeded by Davida Allen
