= Euan Macleod =

New Zealand artist (born 1956)

- Born: 1956 (age 69–70); Christchurch, New Zealand
- Education: Canterbury University, Christchurch NZ
- Known for: Painting
- Awards: Archibald Prize; 1999 Self portrait/head like a hole Blake Prize for Religious Art; 2006 Untitled Landscape with Figure

Euan Macleod (born 1956) is a New Zealand-born artist. Macleod was born in Christchurch, New Zealand and moved to Sydney, Australia in 1981, where he lives and works. He received a Certificate in Graphic Design from Christchurch Technical College in 1975 and a Diploma in Fine Arts (Painting) from the University of Canterbury in 1979. As well as pursuing his art he also teaches painting at the National Art School in Sydney.

== Style ==
Macleod deals mostly with landscapes and the human presence within it. The lone, anonymous figure is a common symbol in his work that embodies both the artist's self-portrait and the "Everyman" or universal experience of emptiness, worthlessness and impotence. He has been described as both an expressionist and a symbolist and his dense, textured and sculptural use of paint has become a consistent feature of his work. Macleod is not limited when it comes to the landscapes he paints, feeling equally at home in the picturesque New Zealand countryside and the harsh and flat Australian outback and often painting a hybrid of both landscapes.

== Exhibitions ==
Throughout his career, Macleod has exhibited frequently. In 1980 he was involved in his first exhibition Tar Paint Plastic at the Settlement Gallery, Wellington, New Zealand with artists Debra Bustin and Alison Clouston, which was hailed as an "impressive debut" by reviewer Neil Rowe. Since then he has held over 100 solo shows and been involved in over 200 group shows. He exhibits most frequently with Niagara Galleries, Melbourne; Watters Gallery, Sydney; and Bowen Galleries, Wellington. Macleod has been involved in the Melbourne Art Fair since 2004 as well as the Auckland Art Fair since 2007.

== Collections ==
Macleod's work is featured in public and private collections across Australia and overseas. In Australia he is included in the collections of the National Gallery of Victoria, National Gallery of Australia, Heide Museum of Modern Art and Art Gallery of Western Australia as well as state, regional, university and private collections. Internationally Macleod's work is featured in the Metropolitan Museum of Art, New York and collections throughout New Zealand, including the Chartwell Collection, Saatchi & Saatchi and the Centre for Contemporary Art, Christchurch.

== Awards ==
Macleod was a finalist in the Wynne Prize in 1998 with a 3m wide work "Seascape through Figures" then again in 1999 and 2003 and won the Archibald Prize in 1999, with his painting titled Self portrait/head like a hole. He was a finalist in the Sulman Prize in 1996, 1998, 1999 and 2000, before winning the prize in 2001, with the painting titled Exquisite Corpse with Fire. Macleod won the Blake Prize for Religious Art in 2006 and the Gallipoli Art Prize in 2009. He was the Archibald Prize finalist in 2018, 2019 and 2021. In 2021 he won the Dobell Drawing Prize with a pastel-on-paper work entitled Borderlands.

Awards
Preceded by Lewis Miller	Archibald Prize; 1999 for Self portrait/head like a hole	Succeeded by Adam Cullen
