= Peter Wegner (Australian artist) =

Australian painter (born 1953)

Peter Wegner (born 1953) is a Melbourne-based figurative painter, sculptor, and draughtsman. His work hangs in many galleries in Australia, and he is known for winning the Archibald Prize in 2021.

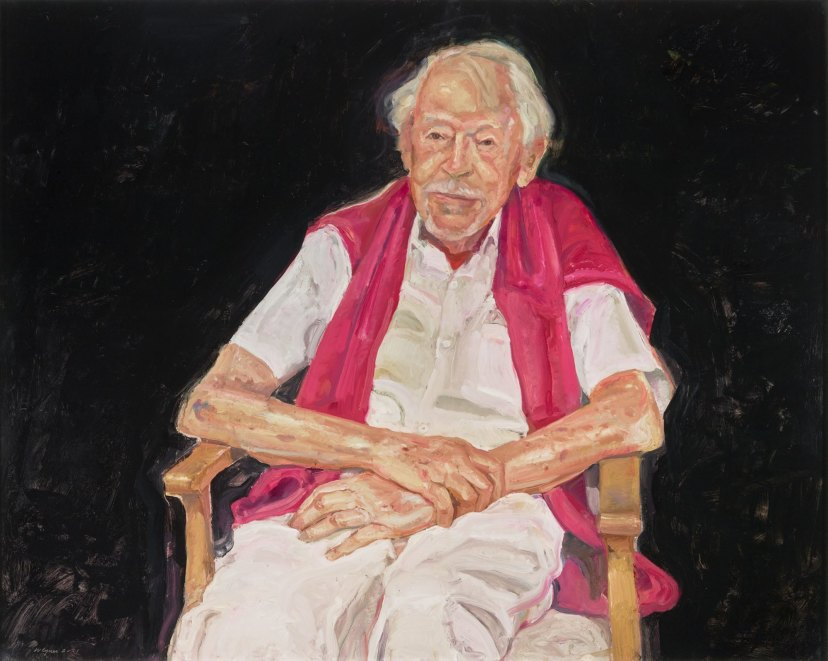
Wegner's 2021 Archibald Prize-winning portrait of Guy Warren

== Early life and education ==
Peter Wegner was born in 1953.

He gained a fine arts degree in 1985, and obtained a postgraduate diploma in 1988 from the Phillip Institute of Technology. In 2007 he completed a Master of Fine Arts at Monash University.

== Career ==
After Wegner exhibited his work in a in group exhibition in 1977, having had no training in art, he was awarded a two-year A.M.E. Bale residential painting scholarship under Sir William Dargie.

After gaining his degree and diploma, he started lecturing in the Drawing Department of Ballarat University, and has also since been a visiting lecturer at La Trobe, Monash and RMIT universities.

== Exhibitions ==
Wegner has held many solo exhibitions since 1982 and his work has been included in many group exhibitions.

- Dobell Prize for Drawing, Art Gallery of New South Wales, 2012
- BP Portrait Prize, National Portrait Gallery, London and Edinburgh, 2012
- Archibald Prize finalists, 2011
- Archibald Prize finalists, 2020
- Archibald Prize winner, 2021

== Awards ==
- 2021 Winner Archibald Prize
- 2016: Rick Amor Prize for small drawings, Art Gallery of Ballarat, for Three Days with EM
- 2013: Winner, Gallipoli Art Prize
- 2006: Doug Moran National Portrait Prize, for Wounded Poet 2006 (Graham Doyle)
- Four-time finalist in the Archibald Prize.
- 1978-1980: A.M.E. Bale residential painting scholarship under Sir William Dargie

== Public collections ==
Wegner's work is held in public collections including:

- National Portrait Gallery (Canberra)
  - Don Argus (2004)
  - Jacques Miller (2002)
  - Victor Smorgon (2000)
  - Graeme Clark (2000). As an etching, profile, and portrait.
  - John Marsden (1998)
- Art Gallery of New South Wales
- National Library of Australia
- Tasmanian Museum and Art Gallery
- Heide Museum of Modern Art, Melbourne
- State Library of Victoria
- Castlemaine Art Museum

Awards
Preceded by Vincent Namatjira	Archibald Prize; 2021 for Portrait of Guy Warren at 100	Succeeded by Blak Douglas
