= Lewis Miller (Australian artist) =

Australian painter and visual artist (born 1959)

Lewis Miller (born 1959 in Melbourne) is an Australian painter and visual artist, known for his portraits and figurative works.

== History ==
Miller's father Peter Miller was a painter in the social realist tradition. His sister Lisa Miller is an Australian singer-songwriter.

He studied painting at the Victorian College of the Arts in Melbourne from 1977 to 1979, and then travelled to London, Europe and Malaysia. He held his first solo exhibition in 1986 and is represented in the National Gallery of Australia, state and private galleries. In 1998, he won the Archibald Prize, which brought him greater prominence and led to many further commissions. He has travelled widely, including to the US in 1998, 2000, 2003 and 2005.

In 2003 and 2005, Miller was commissioned to produce a series of portraits of the scientists and technicians involved in the mapping of the human genome.

His other commissioned portraits include Australian rules football coach Ron Barassi, mountaineer Sir Edmund Hillary and scientist James D. Watson. In 2003, he travelled to Iraq as Official Australian War Artist.

By 2005, he had entered the Archibald prize 17 times and had been a finalist 13 times. He was interviewed in the 2005 Peter Berner documentary Loaded Brush.

As of 2022, Miller has been a finalist in the Archibald prize 18 times, including with his portrait of Deborah Conway.

He currently lives in Melbourne with his wife and one son.

== Awards ==
- 1982 – Hugh Ramsay Portrait Prize
- 1998 – Archibald Prize – Portrait of Allan Mitelman No 3
- 2000 – Art Gallery of New South Wales, Sporting Portrait Prize – Ronald Dale Barassi
- 2017 – Rick Amor self-portrait prize

Awards
Preceded by Nigel Thomson	Archibald Prize; 1998 for Portrait of Allan Mitelman No 3	Succeeded by Euan MacLeod
