= Jude Rae =

Australian artist

- Born: 1956 (age 69–70); Sydney, Australia
- Education: Julian Ashton Art School, University of Sydney, University of New South Wales, University of Canterbury
- Awards: Bulgari Award (2016), Portia Geach Memorial Award (2005 and 2008)
- Website: www.juderae.com

Jude Rae (born 1956) is an Australian artist. She has exhibited, predominantly in Australia and New Zealand, since the 1980s, and is famous for her still life paintings, large scale interiors, and portraits.

== Biography ==
Jude Rae was born in Sydney in 1956. Her father, David Rae, was a realist painter, who is also exhibited in the collection of the Art Gallery of New South Wales. She attended Julian Ashton Art School alongside her secondary school education from age 11 or 12. Both of her parents also trained at Julian Ashton Art School.

Rae has completed a Bachelor of Arts in Fine Arts, focusing on Art History at the University of Sydney (1993) having started enrolled in Biochemistry. Rae went on to achieve a Graduate Diploma in Professional Art Studies, University of New South Wales (1984), and Master of Arts (Painting), University of Canterbury, Christchurch, New Zealand (1993).

Rae began exhibiting in the 1980s, and was first included in 12 Contemporary Women at the Bathurst Regional Art Gallery. In 1987, Rae then began showing with Painters Gallery, Sydney. In 1989, after receiving the Australia Council Residency in Paris and working in London, she came to New Zealand and lived in Christchurch. She returned to Australia in 2003, and in the early 2000s, Rae won several awards including the Portia Geach Memorial Award in both 2005 and 2008.

She has also taught in both Australia and New Zealand, including at Australian National University.

== Exhibitions ==
Rae has been exhibited in both solo and group exhibitions across Australia and New Zealand since the 1980s. Recent exhibitions have included:

- Know My Name, in 2021, at The National Gallery of Australia included Rae in their major survey of Australian women artists.
- Jude Rae: A Space of Measured Light, in 2017 at the Drill Hall Gallery at the Australian National University, Canberra (curated by Terence Maloon).
- Jude Rae: Still Lifes, in 2010 at Canberra Museum and Gallery (curated by Mark Van Veen).
- Idle Hours, in 2009-2010 at National Portrait Gallery included one of her portraits as a key artwork.

== Artworks ==
Rae is known for her still lifes, large scale interiors, and portraits, several of which have been award-winning. Her artworks are found in collections across Australia and New Zealand, including the Art Gallery of New South Wales, Auckland Art Gallery Toi o Tāmaki, National Gallery of Australia, Parliament House Art Collection, National Portrait Gallery, Te Papa Tongarewa as well as private collections.

Rae is frequently commissioned to paint portraits. Her portraits have included several famous Australians and New Zealanders:

- Saul Griffith in 2022
- Sian Elias, first female Chief Justice in the Supreme Court of New Zealand, in 2019 for the New Zealand Law Society.
- Linda Burney, first Aboriginal woman elected to the House of Representatives, in 2018 for the Parliament of Australia.
- Terry Snow in 2017 for the National Portrait Gallery of Australia.
- Susan Kiefel, Chief Justice of Australia, in 2017 for the High Court of Australia.
- The Honourable Anna Bourke AO, Speaker of the Australian House of Representatives, in 2015 for the Parliament of Australia, which was the first portrait of a female subject painted by a female artist in the Australian Parliamentary Collection.
- Owen G. Glenn in 2009 for the University of Auckland.
- Frank Fenner in 2007 for the National Portrait Gallery of Australia.

== Awards ==
Rae has won several awards including:

- The Bulgari Award, Art Gallery of New South Wales, in 2016 for SL 359 2016.
- The Portia Geach Memorial Award, S. H. Ervin Gallery, in 2008 for Self Portrait 2008 (The Year My Husband Left).
- The Portia Geach Memorial Award, S. H. Ervin Gallery, in 2005 for Large Interior (Micky Allan).

Rae has also been the finalist in:

- Wynne Prize, Art Gallery of New South Wales, in 2022 for The white fig (Ficus virens), Royal Botanic Garden, Sydney.
- Highly Commended, Archibald Prize, Art Gallery of New South Wales, in 2022 for The big switch – portrait of Dr Saul Griffith.
- Sulman Prize, Art Gallery of New South Wales, in 2021 for On the beach (Malua Bay, NYE 2019).
- Highly Commended, Archibald Prize, Art Gallery of New South Wales, in 2021 for Inside Out.
- Highly Commended, Archibald Prize, Art Gallery of New South Wales, in 2019 for Sarah Peirse as Miss Docker in Patrick White's 'A cheery soul' .
- Highly Commended, Archibald Prize, Art Gallery of New South Wales, in 2014 for Sarah Peirse.
- Dobell Drawing Prize, Art Gallery of New South Wales, in 2012 for Untitled 102.
