= Blak Douglas =

Australian artist

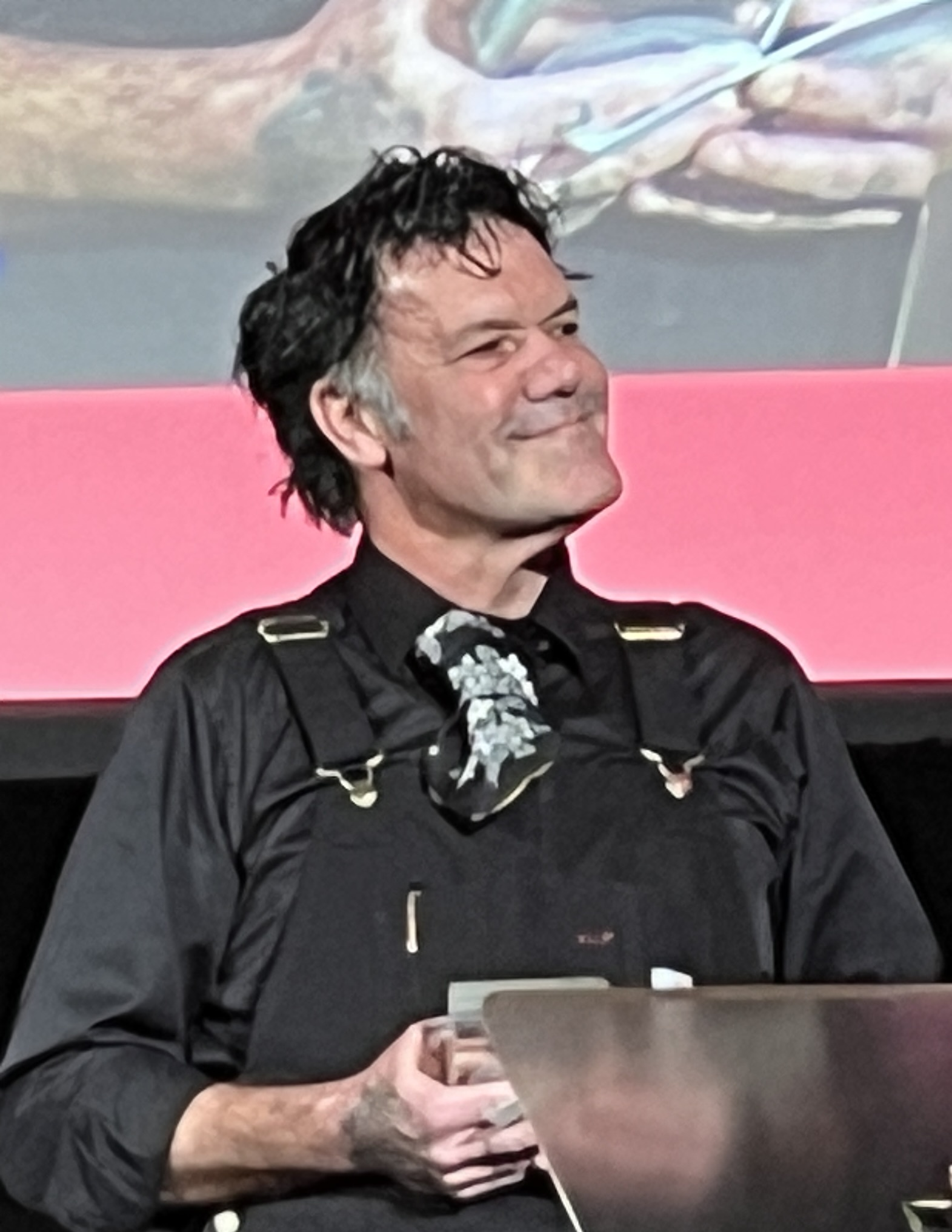
- Douglas at the 2023 NSW Premier's Literary Awards
- Born: 1969 or 1970 (age 56–57); Sydney, Australia
- Occupation: Artist

Blak Douglas (born 1969 or 1970), formerly known as Adam Douglas Hill, is an Aboriginal Australian artist and musician. As of May 2026 he is based in Sydney, New South Wales.

== Early life and education ==
Blak Douglas was born Adam Douglas Hill in 1969 or 1970 in the western Sydney suburb of Blacktown and raised in Penrith. His parents were Bob and Yvonne Hill. He is a Dhungatti man, with Irish, Scots, English, and German ancestry.

He was classically trained in playing the didgeridoo, but taught himself how to create visual art.

== Career ==
=== Art ===
Douglas has a background in graphic design and drawing. He became a full-time artist in around 2002.

As Adam Hill, he created the exterior artwork on the new recording studios and offices of the Gadigal Information Service, which opened in 2008.

=== Music ===
Douglas has played the didgeridoo in performances across Australia and internationally, including accompanying Christine Anu, Emma and Casey Donovan, Jessica Mauboy, Jenny Morris, Jane Rutter, and Peter Sculthorpe.

== Recognition and awards ==
Douglas was a finalist for the Archibald Prize in 2015 (Smoke and mirrors – Uncle Max Eulo) and 2018 (Uncle Roy Kennedy).

A portrait of Douglas by Euan Macleod was finalist for the 2021 Archibald Prize.

He won the 2022 Archibald Prize for his portrait of Wiradjuri artist Karla Dickens, having been a finalist five times. The painting is titled Moby Dickens, and depicts Dickens standing calf-deep in floodwaters in her hometown of Lismore. He said that it was a political statement, "a call to vote out the Morrison government.

== Exhibitions ==
A free exhibition of Douglas' work, titled Home Flown, is mounted on the Reconciliation Wall at NSW Parliament House until 25 June 2026.

== Collections ==
His work is held in the National Gallery of Australia and the Art Gallery of New South Wales.

== Personal life ==
Douglas changed his name to avoid confusion with Australian comedian Adam Hills.

Awards
Preceded by Peter Wegner	Archibald Prize years=2022 for Portrait of Karla Dickens	Succeeded by Julia Gutman
