= Lucy Culliton =

Australian artist (born 1966)

- Born: 1966 (age 59–60); Sydney, Australia
- Education: National Art School, graduating in 1996
- Known for: painting
- Notable work: Bibbenluke (2007)
- Website: https://www.janmurphygallery.com.au/artist/lucy-culliton/

Lucy Culliton (born 1966) is an Australian artist, based in Bibbenluke. She is known for her paintings of landscapes and still life.

== Early life and education ==
Culliton was born in Sydney in 1966. She studied fine art at the National Art School, graduating in 1996.

== Career ==
Culliton joined the Ray Hughes Gallery in 1999 and is currently represented by King Street Gallery on William. She is a regular finalist in the Archibald, Wynne and Sulman Prizes. Her work is represented in the collections of the National Gallery of Australia and Parliament House, Canberra, as well as in many private collections. She lives and works in Bibbenluke, on the NSW Monaro.

In 2013 she illustrated a picture book

In 2016 Culliton is a participant in the Sydney Art of Music exhibition.

== Exhibitions ==
Lucy Culliton has exhibited widely throughout her career. Her work was first shown at the Level Gallery in 1998, after which she began exhibiting at the Hughes Gallery. In 2016 Culliton moved to King Street Gallery on William in Sydney.

Her exhibitions focus on a single subject from the 'Food Paintings' of 2000 through 'Cactus' (2004) to the much loved 'The Show' (2007), which focuses on the arts, crafts, and cooking at country shows. Her last trilogy of exhibitions, 'Bibbenluke', 'Home' and 'Bibbenluke Flowers', and the upcoming 'Weeds of the Monaro' are a personal series of works about her home and gardens on the NSW Monaro.

Culliton's love of landscape painting, and her skill at capturing the essence of a place at different times of the day and season, has been shown in a number of group exhibitions. She was part of artist expeditions to Flinders Ranges (the works exhibited at 'On the Heyson Trail' at the SH Ervin Gallery in 2008), The Kimberleys ('Six Artists, Seven Days,' Mary Place Gallery, 2013) and New Zealand ('On This Island', NG Gallery, 2010). She has regularly exhibited alongside fellow leading landscape artists Joe Furlonger and Jun Chen in the 'Australian Landscapes' exhibitions presented at the Hughes Gallery since 2000.

The artist's career was celebrated through the survey exhibition 'Eye of the Beholder: The Art of Lucy Culliton,' at the Mosman Art Gallery from 20 September – 30 November 2014.

In 2015 her art was included in a traveling exhibition entitled "The Art of Shakespeare".

== Awards ==
Lucy Culliton won her first award, the Conrad Jupiters Art Prize, in 1999 - the year she graduated from the National Art School. A series of prizes followed: In 2000 she won the Mosman Art Prize, in 2001 the Rydel Show Prize, and in 2004 the Kedumba Drawing Prize. In 2006 Culliton won the Portia Geach memorial award, the Dubbo Lexis Mortima Prize and the Nowra Nudes Art Show Prize. She has been a regular finalist in the Archibald, Wynne, Sulman and Dobell prizes since the beginning of her career.

== Major collections ==
- National Gallery of Australia, Canberra
- Queensland University Art Museum, Brisbane
- Australian Parliament House, Canberra
- Macquarie Bank
- Gold Coast Arts Centre
- Mosman Art Gallery
