= Kim Leutwyler =

Australian artist

Kim Leutwyler is an artist based in Sydney, Australia. The artist has exhibited in multiple galleries across both Australia, Europe and the United States. While creating a collection of pieces that utilize different mediums, Leutwyler most frequently displays paintings that focus on progressive ideas of gender and beauty, as well as people who identify as queer.

== Personal life and education ==
Born in the United States, Kim Leutwyler spent their formative years traveling and did not spend a substantial amount of time in any given area; the artist briefly lived in Chicago, Illinois, Arizona, and Connecticut. Leutwyler planned to study accounting after finishing their high school education, but an impulse led them to enroll in the art history and fine arts programs at Arizona State University. Leutwyler focused almost exclusively on ceramics and printmaking, receiving bachelor's degrees in both Studio Art and Art History. Seeking to further their education, they later graduated from the School of the Art Institute of Chicago with a Painting and Drawing degree as well. Leutwyler’s time spent studying abroad at the University of Auckland in New Zealand left a deep impression, leading them to migrate to Australia in late 2012.

In 2024 Leutwyler underwent gender-affirming surgery. The artist was painted for a 2025 Archibald finalist portrait by friend and fellow artist, Solomon Kammer. The nude portrait features Leutwyler’s chest surgery.

For both Kammer and Leutwyler, this portrait ‘celebrates Kim reclaiming themself, but acknowledges that it’s not without a cost. They advocate for the depoliticisation of trans bodies and lives so that trans people may access their right to live safe, joyful, thriving lives.’

== Career ==
Leutwyler has created works using a variety of mediums, including installation, ceramics, drawing, and printmaking. Predominately focusing on LGBT-identified and allied women, trans, and gender nonconforming people, the artist’s large-scale paintings stimulate dialogue in both mainstream and feminist art worlds. Leutwyler’s portraiture series features a mix of notable activists and artists, including musician and drag queen Trixie Mattel, marriage equality activist Sally Rugg, Olympic athlete Michelle Heyman and DJ, writer and actor Faustina Agolley.

Leutwyler has a deep desire to contribute to the destabilization of gender borders. As the artist often explains, their work tends to explore the fine lines between objectification, glorification, and modification. Both the fluidity and overall complexity of identity continue to inspire the artist. With a particularly unique aesthetic, Leutwyler's work features bold and bright blocks of colour that meld with the subjects. As the artist elaborates in an interview:

The 'ideal' female anatomy has changed over time, with varying aesthetics that metamorphose based on age, race, geography and time period. For centuries, humans have embraced body modification as a means of expression, rites of passage, religious beliefs and cultural aesthetics. I paint my friends and the people that I care about most, who embrace a small fraction of current cultural aesthetics and modifications. Body art, plastic surgery and piercings are not uncommon among the women you see in my work.

It was the historical use of patterns to contemplate concepts like beauty, piety, and justice that provides inspiration for much of Leutwyler's work. In fact, many of the subjects in their works are depicted before their favorite patterns. It was this fascination that led the artist to the discovery of Kehinde Wiley, an artist whose highly naturalistic work displays individuals posed before patterns of various cultures.

Realizing that that other artists were exploring similar boundaries, Leutwyler sought further inspiration by investigating art history. This led to a love of artists like Caravaggio who utilized tenebrism, painting only where the light bounced off of the subject. Inspired by such techniques, Leutwyler adopted the practice of blending bright and vivid patterns where the shadows of the subject might be.

Another great inspiration was Robert Rauschenberg, an artist whose body of work and legacy garnered Leutwyler's attention. He contributed a substantial amount of money and time to the establishment of organizations that supported such things as human rights and world peace.

Such philanthropic efforts were something that Leutwyler admired. The artist’s desire to impact the world through artistic vision remains their ultimate goal, and has led them to the founding of a project, PhilanthropART. Leutwyler periodically donates a portion of the proceeds from their artwork to this project; the proceeds are then donated to different non-profit organizations.

Leutwyler was a finalist for the 2015, 2017, 2018, 2019, 2021, 2022 and 2023 Archibald Prize. Making them a seven time Archibald finalist, as of 2023.

=== Collections ===
- Brooklyn Art Library, Brooklyn, New York
- Printmaking Student Association Collection, Arizona State University
