= Bawden =

Bawden is an English surname. Notable people with the surname include:

- Bob Bawden (1917–1980), Australian football player
- Carly Bawden (born 1988), English actress
- Charles Bawden (1924–2016), professor of Mongolian, University of London
- David Bawden (1959–2022), American sedevacantist claimant to the papacy
- Edward Bawden (1903–1989), English painter, illustrator and graphic artist
- Frederick Charles Bawden (1908–1972), British plant pathologist and virologist
- Grace Bawden (born 1992), Australian singer
- Jeff Bawden (1924–2006), English rugby player
- Kevin Bawden (born 1946), Australian Paralympics competitor
- Lionel Bawden (born 1974), Australian visual artist
- Louise Bawden (born 1981), Australian beach volleyball player
- Nick Bawden (born 1996), American football player
- Nina Bawden (1925–2012), English novelist and children's writer
- Peter Bawden (1929–1991), Canadian businessman and politician
- Russell Bawden (born 1973), Australian rugby player
- William Bawden (1563–1632), English Jesuit implicated in the Gunpowder plot
