= John Dahlsen =

- Born: 1958 (age 67–68); Sydney
- Education: Victorian College of the Arts and Melbourne College of Advanced Education and Charles Darwin University
- Known for: Environmental art
- Movement: Environmental Art
- Awards: 2000 Wynne Prize
- Website: http://www.johndahlsen.com/

John Dahlsen is an Australian contemporary environmental artist. He uses found recycled objects, primarily ocean litter plastics, from predominantly Australian beaches in his work.

== Biography ==
Dahlsen studied art from 1977 to 1979 at the Victorian College of the Arts and in 1989 at the Melbourne College of Advanced Education. He completed his PhD at Charles Darwin University in 2016. In addition to his art, he also lectures at Australian universities and at environmental symposiums around the world. He has exhibited work in many solo and group exhibitions since 1979. Dahlsen currently lives in Byron Bay, New South Wales, Australia.

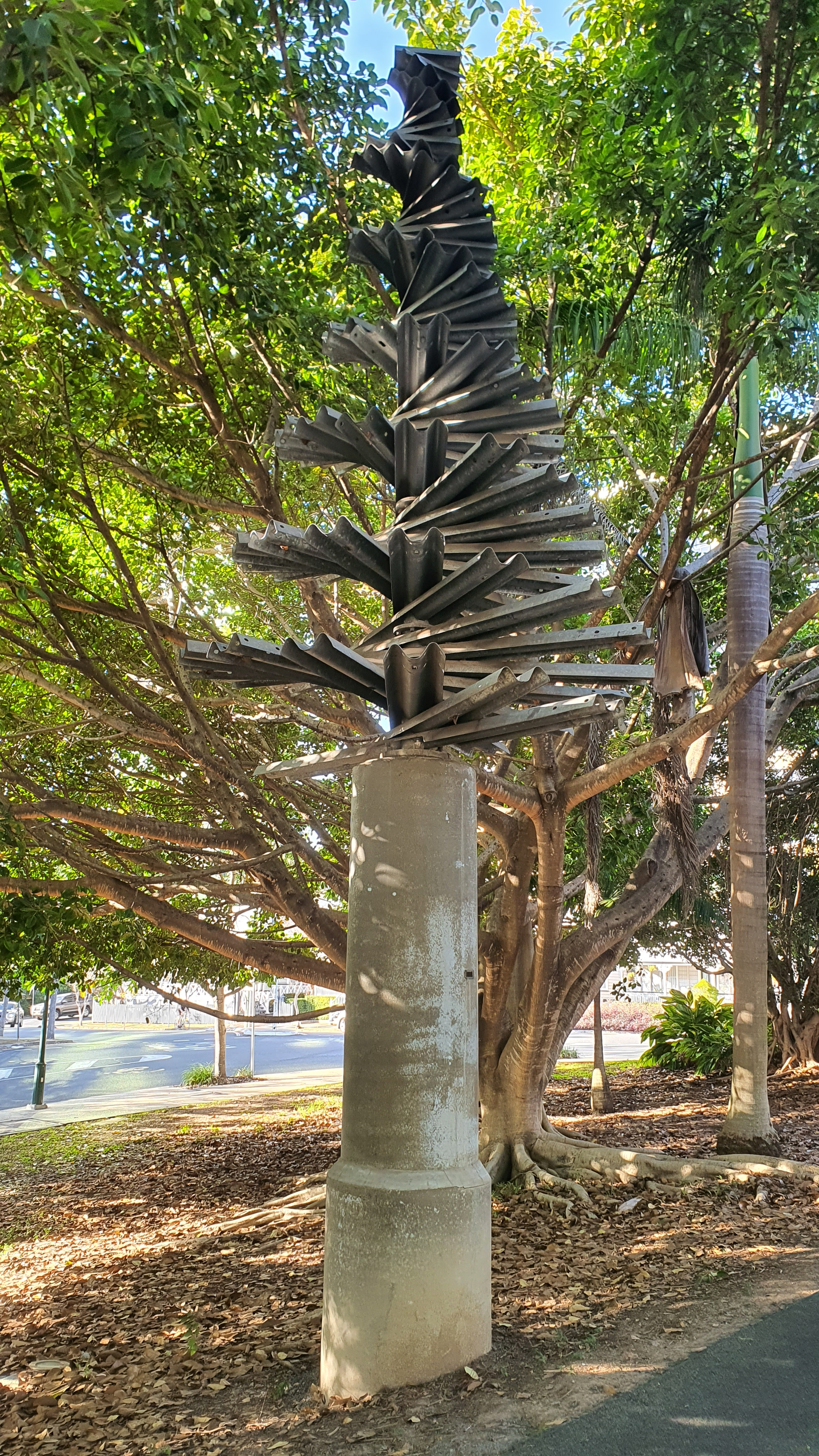
Guardian sculpture in Kangaroo Point, Brisbane

== Awards ==
In 2000, Dahlsen won the Wynne Prize from the Art Gallery of New South Wales for his piece Thong Totems. He was also a finalist in both 2003 and 2004. In 2006 he was a finalist for the Sir John Sulman Medal from the Art Gallery of New South Wales and the second prize winner of the Signature of Sydney Art Prize. He has also won many other awards, such as the 2003 award for mixed media/new media at the Florence Biennial of Contemporary Art, Environmental Art Awards at the Swell Sculpture Exhibition in 2009 and 2010, and the Peoples Choice Award in the ArtsCape Biennial Sculpture Exhibition in 2010.

Dahlsen’s practice examines the relationship between humanity and the natural landscape, using discarded materials to address beauty, degradation, and the passage of time. His work mobilizes the boundaries between the synthetic and the natural—taking artificial materials reclaimed by the tides and transforming them into balanced aesthetic compositions.

Dahlsen has led a varied life in different locations. He spent time living in Indian ashrams, exploring Eastern philosophy and meditation. This background informs the quiet, meditative rhythm in his wall sculptures and installations.

Discipline, Wellness & Coastal Life Based in Byron Bay, New South Wales, Dahlsen emphasizes the connection between physical vitality and creative endurance. He maintains a disciplined daily routine involving cycling, weight training, and morning walks along the Cape Byron Lighthouse trail. In an interview on his website, he stressed that maintaining physical fitness and resilience is essential for artists to weather the natural ebbs and flows of a creative career.

Core Philosophy: The Three Pillars In his doctoral thesis at Charles Darwin University, titled Environmental Art: Aesthetics, Activism, and Transformation, Dr. Dahlsen articulated the three core tenets that guide his work:

Aesthetics (Beauty): Rather than confronting viewers with grim or shocking imagery, Dahlsen intentionally crafts visually captivating, harmonious compositions. The beauty serves as an inviting gateway.

Activism (Social Conscience): Once drawn in by the colors and textures, the viewer experiences a secondary realization: the artwork is made entirely from human trash. This inspires dialogue on consumerism, waste, and marine conservation without guilt-tripping the audience.

Transformation: The alchemical process of taking discarded "rubbish" and elevating it into fine art, inviting viewers to reflect on renewal and positive stewardship in their own lives.

Dahlsen earned a PhD from Charles Darwin University in 2016. His blends art sales with academic papers, keynote lectures, educational school resources, and self-published guidebooks. His artsyle is versatile, from original museum-grade resin assemblages and public sculptures to limited-edition fine art prints, hotel commissions, and books.

Conceptual Consistency vs. Market Evolution: Dahlsen’s core concept: transforming discarded flotsam into structured, colour-coded aesthetics, was groundbreaking in the late 1990s and early 2000s. As environmental art and sustainability themes became more mainstream across the global art world, his foundational work remained an influential precursor. Broadening of Reach: While the initial shock value of working with ocean trash has matured into an established genre, Dahlsen's reach transitioned from conventional commercial gallery spaces into broader educational, civic, and public art spheres (including public commissions, international symposiums, and academic publications). Quality of Work: Rather than receding, his craft has diversified. By incorporating printmaking, digital abstractions of natural textures, and large-scale public installations alongside his classic assemblages, he has maintained a refined aesthetic standard that continues to bridge fine art with environmental activism.

Dahlsen's recent microplastic series and techniques:

John Dahlsen’s shift toward microplastics marks an intentional bridge between his early roots as a painter and his long-running career in environmental assemblage. While his early work tackled large, recognizable debris (bottles, ropes, and flip-flops (things), his recent series address the unseen, systemic crisis of plastic broken down to grain-sized fragments.

Key Microplastic Series 1. The Pacific Garbage Patch & Gyre Series Cartographic & Satellite Inspiration: Instead of isolated beach debris, these works use satellite data and thermal mapping of the oceanic gyres—particularly the Great Pacific Garbage Patch. Abstract Topography: Dahlsen models swirling oceanic vortexes where millions of tiny plastic flecks drift suspended in resin, representing both the vast scale of the open ocean and the microscopic density of the pollution. 2. Interior / Ingestion & Self Portrait Series Bio-accumulation: Inspired by ecological and medical studies showing humans ingest microplastics weekly (roughly the equivalent of a credit card), Dahlsen turned the focus inward. Human Forms: In pieces like Self Portrait with Unintended Ingested Micro Plastics and Interior Detail, Dahlsen draws figurative silhouettes using ink, charcoal, and gesso on raw linen, filling the inner flesh areas entirely with hundreds of suspended microplastic particles. Techniques & Artistic Process Dahlsen refers to this workflow as "painting with an environmental palette." Rather than physically nailing or arranging large objects behind glass, he treats plastic as pigment: Sourcing & Sifting: Dahlsen collects fine coastal detritus along Northern New South Wales (extensively around Byron Bay). He has collected material from beaches in areas such as Victoria’s east coast, the Northern Territory, Far North Queensland, as well as internationally including Europe, China and Indonesia. He currently screens and sorts fragments down to sizes under 1–5 mm, classifying them by tone, density, and colour value. Sustainable Plant-Based Resins: To avoid the ecological contradiction of using petroleum-heavy synthetic epoxies, he binds and suspends the microplastics in ecologically sustainable, clear plant-based resin. Brush Application on Belgian Linen: He applies the resin-plastic slurry directly onto stretched Belgian linen. The resin serves dual roles: it functions as a fluid medium for the brush and dries with optical clarity, giving the micro-particles depth and translucency without dulling their weathered coastal colours. Mixed-Media Layering: Dahlsen combines the resin applications with traditional mark-making—such as gesso and clear grounds, charcoal shading, and inks—reintegrating classical studio techniques with contemporary environmental materials.

Through this evolution, Dahlsen moved beyond the straightforward "beach clean-up" narrative to confront how synthetic materials have permanently integrated into global food chains, marine currents, and human biology.

He has also been awarded several grants from the Australian government as well as private groups including winning a Churchill Fellowship in 2015.

== See also ==
- Art of Australia
