= Sali Herman =

Swiss-born Australian artist

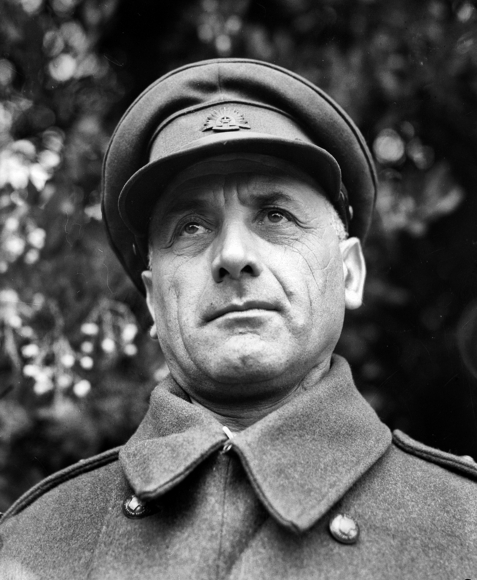
- Sali Herman as a captain in 1945
- Born: 12 February 1898; Switzerland
- Died: 3 April 1993 (aged 95)
- Known for: war artist
- Notable work: Sleeping Cat, Lane at the Cross, Yetta
- Awards: Sulman Prize (1946, 1948), Wynne Prize (1944, 1962, 1965, 1967)

Sali Herman CMG (né Yakubowitsch; 12 February 1898 – 3 April 1993) was a Swiss-born Australian artist, one of Australia's Official War Artists for the Second World War.

== Life and career ==
Herman arrived in Melbourne in 1937 and enlisted in the Australian Army in 1941. In 1945, he was appointed an Official War Artist, painting at several places in the Pacific such as Rabaul. He submitted 26 paintings to the Australian War Memorial.

Sali Herman was known for paintings of inner city streets and slums in Sydney. He was awarded the Sulman Prize in 1946 for Natives carrying wounded soldiers, and also in 1948 for The Drovers. He won the Wynne Prize four times; in 1944 for McElhone Stairs; in 1962 for The Devil's Bridge, Rottnest; again in 1965 for The Red House; and in 1967 for Ravenswood I.

== Collections ==
- Art Gallery of New South Wales including Sleeping Cat (1983), Summer night, Mullerup (1975), Lane at the Cross (1946), and Yetta (1919).
- Art Gallery of Western Australia
- Australian War Memorial including Native compound at Lae (1945), Surrender (1946), and Back Home (1946).
- Benalla Art Gallery
- Cbus Collection of Australian Art
- National Gallery of Australia including McElhone Stairs (1944), The Drovers (1947), and Saturday Morning (1948).
- National Gallery of Victoria including Kirribilli (1959), and The Law Court (1946).
- Newcastle Art Gallery
- Rockhampton Museum of Art

== Exhibitions ==
=== Group ===
- Aspects of Australian Figurative Painting 1942-1962: Dreams, Fears and Desires, S. H. Ervin Gallery, Sydney (1984), part of the 5th Sydney Biennale, painting exhibited: Reconstruction (1950)
- Swiss Artists in Australia: 1777-1991 Art Gallery of New South Wales, Sydney (1991), paintings exhibited: Surry Hills Backyards (1958), Fremantle Brewery (1963), Ming (1963), Surry Hills Lane (1965), The Red House (1966), Balmain (1968), B.H.P. (1969), Summer Night, Mullerup (1975), Forum, Rome (1976), Sydney 1942 (1981), My World (1990).
