= Albert J. Hanson =

Australian artist

Albert John Hanson
- Born: September 28, 1867; Paddington, Sydney, Australia
- Died: July 11, 1914 (aged 46); Haberfield, Sydney, Australia
- Education: Royal Art Society's school
- Occupation: Artist
- Known for: Landscape painting; winner of the 1905 Wynne Prize
- Notable work: The Blue Noon (1905); Pacific Beaches (1898); The Low Lispings of the Silvery Waves (1892)

Albert John Hanson (28 September 1867 – 11 July 1914) was an Australian artist, winner of the 1905 Wynne Prize.

He died at his home in Haberfield on 11 July 1914.
