= Proposal for landscaped cosmos =

2010 painting by Sam Leach

- Artist: Sam Leach
- Year: 2010
- Medium: oil and resin on wood
- Dimensions: 30 cm × 30 cm (12 in × 12 in)
- Location: Private collection

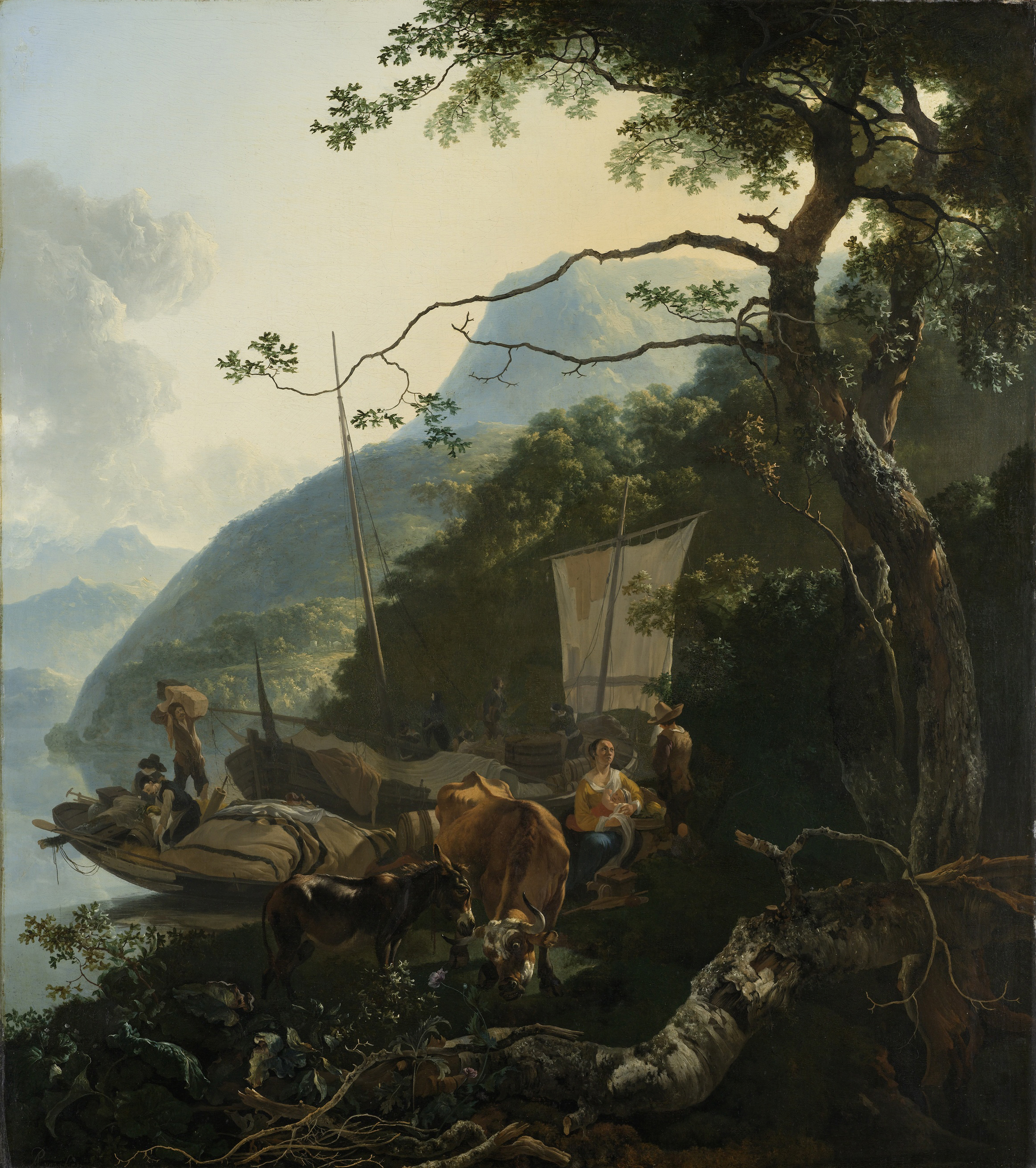
Adam Pynacker - Boatmen Moored on the Shore of an Italian Lake, said to have been the template for Proposal for landscaped cosmos

Proposal for landscaped cosmos is a 2010 painting by Australian artist Sam Leach. The work "heavily references" a 1660 painting by Dutch master Adam Pynacker, Boatmen Moored on the Shore of an Italian Lake.

The Art Gallery of New South Wales awarded the work the Wynne Prize for landscape painting in 2010. Leach became only the third artist - after William Dobell and Brett Whiteley - to win the Wynne Prize and the Archibald Prize for portrature in the same year.

This award was controversial as the Wynne Prize is awarded for Australian landscapes and Leach's painting was described as an 'almost exact replica" of Pynacker's painting of an (imagined) Italian scene. Leach was also criticised for not acknowledging his source. Ted Snell, chair of the visual arts board of the Australia Council said "Without referencing the original, it runs very close to breaching ethical practice". Professor Linda Williams from RMIT University said "Leach seems to me to be an artist who approaches 17th-century culture and science with respect. I wouldn't call him a copy-cat and I wouldn't call him a genius. I would call him an excellent artist".

The Sydney Morning Herald noted that "Leach has removed the figures from the composition and added some touches of his own. In the top left-hand corner there a grid of neatly arranged stars, in the bottom corner, there is a mirror grid of red LED lights". When asked why he did not reference the work's connection Leach said "If I put 'After Pynacker' in the title, then all of a sudden the painting becomes more about Pynacker, but that's not where my focus is."

My ideal thing would be to see the paintings side by side somewhere ... I'm not necessarily interested in trying to come up with my own personal interpretation of a landscape, I'm more interested in the construction of landscape in painting in art history. I've done similar things with still life.

— Leach,

The work is part of a private collection.
