= Sam Leach (artist) =

Australian artist

- Born: Adelaide, South Australia
- Known for: Painting
- Awards: Archibald Prize; 2010 Tim Minchin; Wynne Prize; 2010 Proposal for landscaped cosmos
- Website: www.samleach.net

Sam Leach is an Australian contemporary artist. In 2010 he won the Archibald Prize and the Wynne Prize at the Art Gallery of New South Wales, becoming only the third artist to do so in the same year.

== Early life and education ==
Sam Leach was born in Adelaide, South Australia.

He began studying for a degree in economics in Adelaide. In 2000 he enrolled in the Diploma of Art program at RMIT in Melbourne, Victoria, before transferring to its Bachelor of Fine Art degree course. He completed a Masters in Fine Arts at RMIT in 2004.

== Career ==
Leach's work has been exhibited in several museum shows. In 2008, it was included in Optimism at the Queensland Art Gallery and Neo Goth at the University of Queensland Art Museum The following year, his work was selected for the Shilo Project at the Ian Potter Museum of Art at the University of Melbourne and Horror Come Darkness at the Macquarie University Art Gallery.

In 2007, Leach's work portrait of former Victorian premier Jeff Kennett was selected as a finalist for the Archibald Prize at the Art Gallery of New South Wales. In 2008, his self-portrait wearing a Nazi uniform and adopting a famous pose by Hitler, titled Self in Uniform, also selected as an Archibald finalist, was criticised as offensive by the Jewish community in Melbourne.

In 2010 his work was included in Still at Hawkesbury Regional Gallery.

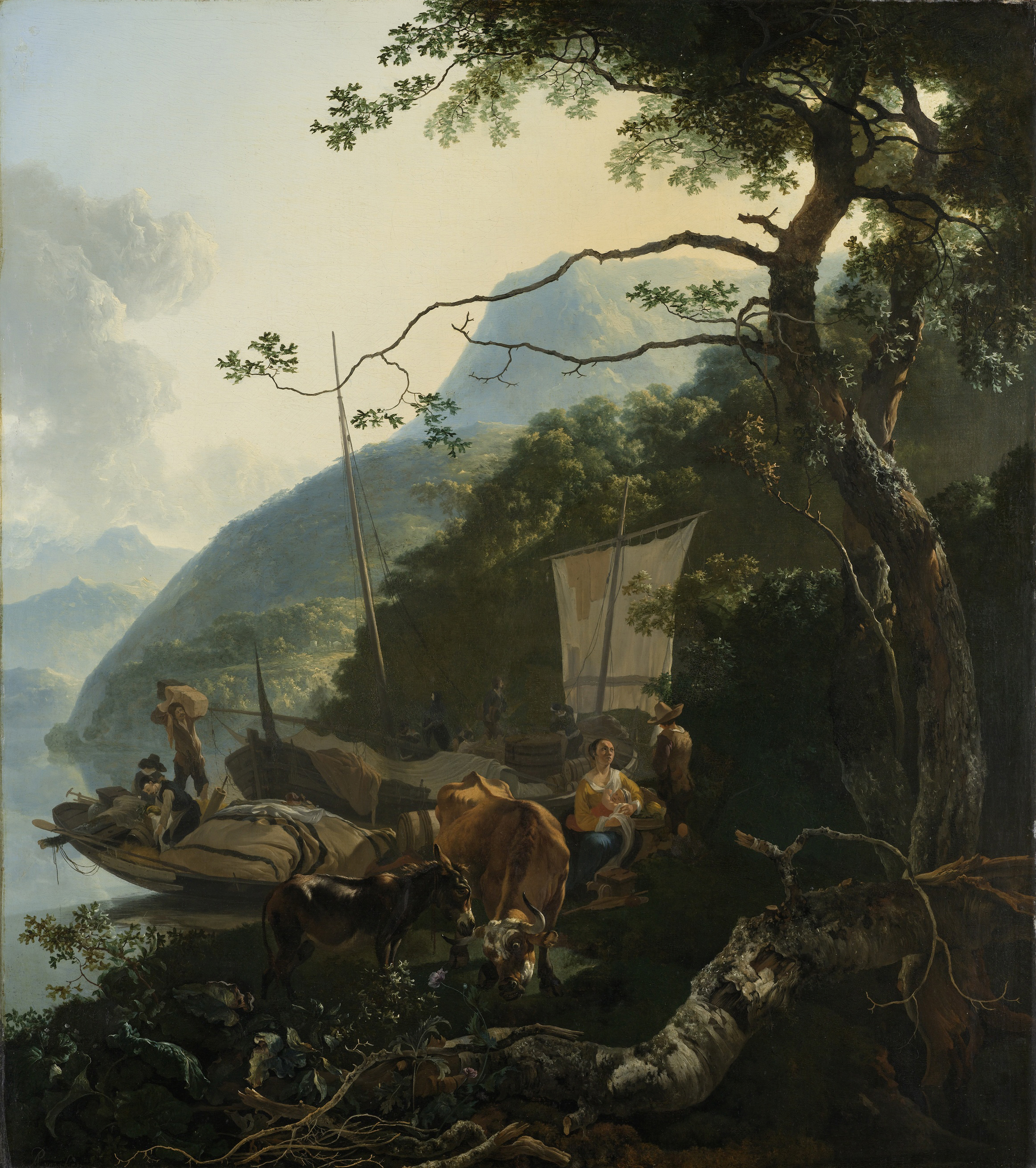
Boatmen Moored on the Shore of an Italian Lake, by Adam Pynacker, which served as inspiration in 2010

Leach's portrait of musical comedian Tim Minchin won the Archibald Prize in 2010. In the same year, he won the Wynne Prize for his landscape Proposal for landscaped cosmos. In doing so he became only the third artist after William Dobell and Brett Whiteley to win the Archibald portrait prize and the Wynne landscape prize in the same year. The award generated some controversy due to the similarities, acknowledged by Leach, between his work and Boatmen Moored on the Shore of an Italian Lake, by seventeenth-century Dutch artist Adam Pynacker.

In 2022, Leach's painting of the farm Harewood, near Meadows, South Australia, was a finalist in the Wynne Prize. The painting, which was assisted by AI, was based on his childhood memories of having spent much time on the farm, which had been once owned by Sir Douglas Mawson and later by his grandparents and then aunt.

== Recognition and awards ==
- 2024: Finalist, Archibald Prize, Art Gallery of New South Wales
- 2022: Finalist, Wynne Prize, Art Gallery of New South Wales
- 2010: Winner, Archibald Prize, Art Gallery of New South Wales, Sydney, winner
- 2010: Winner, Wynne Prize, Art Gallery of New South Wales, Sydney
- 2010 Winner, RMIT Alumnus of the Year Award, RMIT University, Melbourne
- 2009 Finalist, Eutick Memorial Still Life Award, Coffs Harbour Regional Gallery, Coffs Harbour
- 2009 Finalist, Royal Bank of Scotland Emerging Artist Award, Sydney
- 2009 Finalist, University of Queensland Self Portrait Prize, Brisbane
- 2009 Finalist, Arthur Guy Memorial Prize, Bendigo Art Gallery, Bendigo
- 2009 Finalist, Waterhouse Natural Science Art Prize, South Australian Museum, Adelaide
- 2008 Finalist, Archibald Prize, Art Gallery of New South Wales, Sydney
- 2008 Finalist, Stan and Maureen Duke Gold Coast Art Prize, Gold Coast City Gallery, Gold Coast
- 2008 Commendation, Waterhouse Natural Science Art Prize, South Australian Museum, Adelaide
- 2008 Winner, Fleurieu Biennale, Art of Food and Wine and Water Prize, McLaren Vale
- 2008 Finalist, ABN Amro Emerging Artist Award, Sydney
- 2008 Finalist, Archibald Prize, Art Gallery of New South Wales, Sydney
- 2007 Winner, Siemens Fine Art Award, RMIT University, Melbourne
- 2007 Finalist, Eutick Memorial Still Life Award, Coffs Harbour Regional Gallery, Coffs Harbour
- 2007 Finalist, Stan and Maureen Duke, Gold Coast Art Prize, Gold Coast City Gallery, Gold Coast
- 2007 Finalist, Metro5 Art Award, Metro Gallery, Melbourne
- 2007 Finalist, Archibald Prize, Art Gallery of New South Wales, Sydney
- 2006 Winner, Fletcher Jones Contemporary Art Prize, Geelong Gallery, Art Geelong
- 2006 Winner, Metro5 Art Award, Metro Gallery, Melbourne
- 2005 Finalist, Siemens Fine Art Award, RMIT University, Melbourne
- 2004 Finalist, Siemens Fine Art Award, RMIT University, Melbourne

== Collections ==
Leach's work is held in public collections of regional galleries of Geelong, Gold Coast, Coffs Harbour, Newcastle and Gippsland and the collections of La Trobe University and the University of Queensland.

== Exhibitions ==
=== Solo exhibitions ===
- 2014 Theriophily and Substance, ART14 London
- 2013 Careening Meteorites and the Early Mind, Future Perfect, Singapore
- 2013 Sam Leach, Future Perfect, Singapore
- 2011–12: Sam Leach: The Ecstasy of Infrastructure, TarraWarra Museum of Art, Healesville
- 2010 Platonia, COMODAA, London, UK
- 2010 Cosmists, 24HR ART, Northern Territory Centre for Contemporary Art, Darwin
- 2005 The Lift, Spacement, Melbourne
- 2005 The Longed for Departure, Bus Gallery, Melbourne

=== Group exhibitions ===
- 2014 Conquest of Space, COFA Galleries, Sydney, curated by Andrew Frost
- 2014 The Medium is the Message, La Trobe University Museum of Art, Victoria
- 2013 Melbourne Now, National Gallery of Victoria, Melbourne
- 2013 Australia: Contemporary Voices, The Fine Art Society Contemporary, London, UK
- 2013 SkyLab, La Trobe Regional Gallery, Victoria
- 2013 New Horizons, Gippsland Art Gallery, Sale
- 2013 Wonderworks, Cat Street Gallery, Hong Kong
- 2012 Haunts and Follies, Linden Centre for Contemporary Art, Melbourne
- 2012 Animal/Human, University of Queensland Art Museum, University of Queensland, Brisbane
- 2012 Lie of the Land: New Australian Landscapes, Embassy of Australia, Washington, D.C., US
- 2011 Imagining the Future, RMIT Gallery, RMIT University, Melbourne
- 2011 Unknown Pleasures, Gippsland Art Gallery, Sale
- 2011 The Rapture of Death, Gippsland Art Gallery, Sale
- 2011 The New Arcadia, Lismore Regional Gallery, Lismore
- 2011 First Life Residency in Landscape, Xin Dong Cheng Space for Contemporary Art, Beijing, China
- 2011 Together in Harmony, Korean Foundation Cultural Centre, Seoul, South Korea
- 2009 Horror – Come Darkness, Macquarie University Art Gallery, Sydney
- 2009 The Shilo Project, Ian Potter Museum of Art, University of Melbourne, Melbourne and touring
- 2009 Nature ID, Jan Manton Gallery, Brisbane
- 2009 Australia Now, Bedfordbury Gallery, London, UK
- 2009 Surveying the Field, Moreland City Art Gallery, Melbourne
- 2009 Mute Relics and Bedevilled Creatures – Constructing an Antipodean Curio Cabinet, Moreland City Art Gallery, Melbourne
- 2008 Contemporary Australia: Optimism, Queensland Gallery of Modern Art, Brisbane
- 2008 The Year of the Bird, Hawkesbury Regional Gallery, Sydney
- 2008 Heat: Art and Climate Change, RMIT Gallery, RMIT University, Melbourne
- 2008 Neo Goth: Back in Black, University of Queensland Art Museum, Brisbane
- 2008 Bal Tashchit: Thou Shalt Not Destroy – The Environment in Biblical and Rabbinic Sources, Jewish Museum of Australia, Melbourne
- 2007 Momento Mori, Blkmrkt, Brisbane
- 2007 Sincerity of Detail, Wardlow Studios, Melbourne
- 2004 8, RMIT Gallery, RMIT University, Melbourne
- 2004 Melbourne Commonwealth Games Village, Melbourne

Awards
Preceded by Guy Maestri	Archibald Prize; 2010 for Tim Minchin	Succeeded by Ben Quilty
