= Wynne Prize =

Australian art prize

The Wynne Prize is an Australian landscape painting or figure sculpture art prize. As one of Australia's longest-running art prizes, it was established in 1897 from the bequest of Richard Wynne. Now held concurrently with the Sir John Sulman Prize and the Archibald Prize at the Art Gallery of New South Wales in Sydney.

It is awarded annually for "the best landscape painting of Australian scenery in oils or watercolours or for the best example of figure sculpture by Australian artists completed during the 12 months preceding the [closing] date".

Many of Australia's most famous artists have won the prize, including William Dobell, Brett Whiteley, Hans Heysen, Gloria Petyarre, Lloyd Rees, Fred Williams, William Robinson, Eric Smith, Nyapanyapa Yunupingu, and Sali Herman.

In 2010, the prize awarded was A$25,000, but the painting by Sam Leach which was awarded the prize, was later revealed to be a close copy of the 17th-century painting Boatmen Moored on the Shore of an Italian Lake by Adam Pijnacker. Concern was expressed that the prize had been awarded to a painting which did not fulfil the prize's criteria. Nevertheless, the trustees of the Art Gallery of New South Wales decided that the award would stand.

== List of winners ==
Image	Title	Year	Artist	Technique	Dimensions (cm)	Gallery
	The Storm	1897	Walter Withers	oil on canvas on hardboard	119.8 x 179.5	Art Gallery of New South Wales
	The last gleam	1898	W. Lister Lister	oil on canvas	183 x 274.5	
	Across the black soil plains	1899	George Washington Lambert	oil on canvas	91.6 x 305.5	Art Gallery of New South Wales
	Still Autumn	1900	Walter Withers			
	Thunderstorm on the Darling	1901	William Piguenit			
	In Defence of the Flat	1902	James White			
	Glenora	1903	Edward Officer			
	Mystic Morn	1904	Hans Heysen			
	A Blaze of Blue Noon	1905	Albert J. Hanson	watercolour		
	The Golden Splendour of the Bush	1906	W. Lister Lister	oil on canvas	239.8 x 190.5	Art Gallery of New South Wales
	Portrait, H. Garlick, Esq.	1907	G. W. L. Hirst			
	Noontide, Burnside	1908	Will Ashton			
	Summer	1909	Hans Heysen	watercolour		Art Gallery of New South Wales
	Mid Song of Birds and Insects Murmuring	1910	W. Lister Lister			
	Hauling Timber	1911	Hans Heysen	oil on canvas	102.0 x 135.0	Art Gallery of New South Wales
	Sydney Harbour, Overlooking Taylors Bay	1912	W. Lister Lister			
	Federal Capital Site	1913	W. Lister Lister	oil on canvas	159.0 x 284.0	Historical Memorials Collection
	Landscape	1914	Penleigh Boyd			
	Knowledge, Fine Art and Commerce	1915	John Christie Wright			
	Morning Light	1916	Elioth Gruner	oil on canvas on cardboard	51.7 x 56.9	Art Gallery of New South Wales
	The Wind-swept Marsh Lands	1917	W. Lister Lister			
	The Grey Road	1918	W. B. McInnes	oil on canvas	123.2 x 154.6	Art Gallery of New South Wales
	Spring Frost	1919	Elioth Gruner	oil on canvas	157.5 x 206.3	Art Gallery of New South Wales
	The Toilers	1920	Hans Heysen	watercolour on paper	73.0 x 86.0	Art Gallery of South Australia
	Valley of the Tweed	1921	Elioth Gruner	oil on canvas	142.2 x 172.7	Art Gallery of New South Wales
	The Quarry	1922	Hans Heysen	watercolour	51.0 x 66.7	Art Gallery of New South Wales
	Head of an Old Man	1923	G. W. L. Hirst			
	An Afternoon in Autumn	1924	Hans Heysen			
	A Bush Track	1925	W. Lister Lister			
	The Farmyard, Frosty Morning	1926	Hans Heysen			
	Head	1927	Rayner Hoff			
	Afternoon Light, Goulburn Valley	1928	Arthur Streeton	oil on canvas mounted on composition board	51.0 x 76.0	National Gallery of Australia
	On the Murrumbidgee	1929	Elioth Gruner	oil on canvas	101.6 x 123.2	Art Gallery of New South Wales
	Kosciusko	1930	Will Ashton			
	Red Gums of the Far North	1931	Hans Heysen			
	Brachina Gorge	1932	Hans Heysen			
	Youth	1933	Lyndon Dadswell	sculpture		Art Gallery of NSW
	Murrumbidgee Ranges, Canberra	1934	Elioth Gruner	oil on canvas	51.6 x 89.0	National Gallery of Australia
	Winter Morning	1935	James Muir Auld	oil on canvas on paperboard	41.3 x 46.3	Art Gallery of New South Wales
	Landscape	1936	Elioth Gruner			
	Weetangera, Canberra	1937	Elioth Gruner	oil on canvas on cardboard	88 x 100.9	Art Gallery of New South Wales
	The Approaching Storm	1938	Sydney Long			
	Morning Light, Middle Harbour	1939	Will Ashton			
	The Lake, Narrabeen	1940	Sydney Long			
	Valley Farms	1941	Lorna Muir Nimmo			
	Backyards	1942	Douglas Watson			
	The Hilltop	1943	Douglas Dundas			
	McElhone Stairs	1944	Sali Herman			
	Old Grain Stores, Greenaugh, W. A.	1945	Douglas Watson			
	January Weather	1946	Lance Solomon			
	Sofala	1947	Russell Drysdale	oil on canvas on hardboard	71.7 × 93.1	Art Gallery of New South Wales
	Storm Approaching Wangi	1948	William Dobell	oil on cardboard on composition board	32.5 × 55.5	
	Two Rivers	1949	George Lawrence			
	The Harbour from McMahon's Point	1950	Lloyd Rees			
	Never Never Creek, Gleniffer	1951	Charles Meere			
	Summer at Kanmantoo	1952	Charles Bush			
	The River Bend	1953	Lance Solomon			
	Cooktown	1954	Arthur Evan Reed			
	Townsville Waterfront	1955	Charles Bush			
	The Chicory Kiln, Phillip Island	1956	L. Scott Pendlebury			
	Constitution Dock, Hobart	1957	L. Scott Pendlebury			
	The Cliff	1958	Ronald Steuart			
	Harbour Cruise	1959	Reinis Zusters			
	Dairy Farm, Victoria	1960	John Perceval			
	Landscape, Hill End	1961	David Strachan			
	The Devil's Bridge, Rottnest	1962	Sali Herman			
	Sandhills on the Darling	1963	Sam Fullbrook			
	Trees in a Landscape	1964	Sam Fullbrook (joint winner)			
	Landscape	1964	David Strachan (joint winner)			
	The Red House	1965	Sali Herman			
	Upwey Landscape V	1966	Fred Williams			
	Ravenswood I	1967	Sali Herman			
	Road to Whistlewood	1968	L. Scott Pendlebury			
	The Chasing Bird Landscape	1969	John Olsen			
	Redfern, Southern Portal	1970	Frederic Henry Bates			
	Karri Country	1971	Margaret Woodward			
	Falling Bark	1972	Eric Smith			
	Dry Landscape	1973	Clem Millward			
	Redfern Landscape	1974	Eric Smith			
	Murchison Sand Plain	1975	Robert Juniper			
	Mt Kosciusko	1976	Fred Williams			
	The Jacaranda Tree (On Sydney Harbour)	1977	Brett Whiteley			
	Summer at Carcoar	1978	Brett Whiteley			
	Flood Creek	1979	Robert Juniper			
	A Waterfall (Strath Creek)	1980	William Delafield Cook			
	Hills of Ravensdale	1981	David Voight			
	Morning on the Derwent	1982	Lloyd Rees			
	Life Along the Coast	1983	David Rankin			
	The South Coast After Rain	1984	Brett Whiteley			
	The Road to Clarendon, Autumn	1985	John Olsen			
	Torso	1986	Rosemary Madigan			
	Landscape Painting II	1987	Ian Bettinson			
	Fire and Drought near Old Junee	1988	Elwyn Lynn			
	Landscape Painting IV	1989	Ian Bettinson			
	The Rainforest	1990	William Robinson			
	Maschera Femina	1991–92	Peter Schipperheyn			
	Open Cut	1993	George Gittoes			
	Waratahs Wedderburn Series	1994	Suzanne Archer			
	Season of Drought	1995	David Aspden			
	Creation Landscape Earth and Sea	1996	William Robinson			
	Nandi Moon	1997	John Peart			
	Yellow Sound	1998	Ann Thomson			
	Leaves	1999	Gloria Tammere Petyarre			
	Thong Totems	2000	John Dahlsen			
	Piatra	2001	Aida Tomescu			
	Remembering Rain	2002	Angus Nivison			
	Seated Figure	2003	Tim Kyle			
	Untitled	2004	George Ward Tjungurrayi			
	The Road to Utopia	2005	Jenny Sages			
	The Gap	2006	John Beard			
	Winter Nocturne IV	2007	Philip Wolfhagen			
	The River is Calm	2008	Joanne Currie Nalingu			
	The Amorphous Ones (The Vast Colony of Our Being)	2009	Lionel Bawden			
	Proposal for Landscaped Cosmos	2010	Sam Leach	oil and resin on wood	30 × 30	
	Co-Isolated Slave	2011	Richard J. Goodwin			
	Waterfall (After Williams)	2012	Imants Tillers			
	Namatjira	2013	Imants Tillers			
	Oceania High Low	2014	Michael Johnson			
	Biophilia	2015	Natasha Bieniek			
	Seven Sisters	2016	Ken Family Collaborative			
	Antara	2017	Betty Kuntiwa Pumani	acrylic on linen	250 x 200	
	Untitled	2018	Yukultji Napangati	acrylic on linen	244.5 x 183	
	Seven sisters	2019	Sylvia Ken	acrylic on linen	200 x 240	
	Tjoritja	2020	Hubert Pareroultja	acrylic on canvas	183 x 244	
	Garak – night sky	2021	Nyapanyapa Yunupingu	earth pigments on board	244.2 x 244.2	
	Eora	2022	Nicholas Hardling	oil on linen	196.5 x 374.8	
	Inma	2023	Zaachariaha Fielding	acrylic on linen	198.5 x 306.2	
	Nyalala gurmilili	2024	Djakaŋu Yunupiŋu	natural pigments on bark	263 x 154	
	Pre-dawn sky over Port Botany container terminal	2025	Jude Rae	oil on linen	200 x 150.4	
