= Sylvia Ken =

Aboriginal Australian artist

Sylvia Kanytjupai Ken (born 14 March 1965, Amata, South Australia) is an Aboriginal Australian Artist. Her painting Seven Sisters won the 2019 Wynne Prize awarded by the Art Gallery of New South Wales.

== Life ==
Silvia Ken was born in Amata community in the Anangu Pitjantjatjara Yankunytjatjara lands on 14 March 1965. She was schooled in Amata and began painting after leaving school, working also on batik printed on silk.

== Art ==
Since 1999, Ken creates her Tjukurpa paintings, which means Creation stories. She began exhibiting in 2000 as her painted stories have attracted attention. In 2013, 2014 and 2018 Ken was a repeat finalist in the Telstra National Indigenous Art Award. In 2016, Ken’s Seven Sisters exhibited at Short Street Gallery, Broome. Ken’s works were featured in several exhibitions at key galleries and museum, including Olsen Gallery in Sydney and the Jan Murphy Gallery, and were offered at the auctions multiple times with the record price $5,102 USD for Seven Sisters sold at Deutscher & Hackett, Melbourne in 2018.

In 2019, her painting Seven Sisters won the Wynne Prize awarded by the Art Gallery of New South Wales. The painting is a Creation story about the constellations of Pleiades and Orion. The sisters are the constellation of Pleaides travelling across the night sky to avoid the unwanted attention of Orion, or Nyiru, depicted as an older man. Ken’s work has been exhibited throughout Australia and in Singapore and is represented in national and international collections.

In March 2020, it was planned to exhibit her works on the fair at Hong Kong Convention and Exhibition Centre, however the event was cancelled due to the spread of coronavirus COVID-19.

== Collections ==
- Art Gallery of South Australia
- Art Gallery Of New South Wales
- Maroondah Art Gallery Marshall Collection
