= Lionel Bawden =

Australian artist

- Born: 1974 (age 51–52)
- Died: Sydney, Australia

Lionel Bawden (born Sydney, Australia, 1974) is an Australian visual artist. He lives and works in Sydney, Australia.

== Art ==
Bawden showed a keen interest in visual art and drama from a young age. Bawden's early artwork held a strong focus on drawing and he studied at The Phillip St Theatre, Peter Williams School of Dramatic Art from age nine to thirteen. Bawden completed a Bachelor of Arts in Painting at the Canberra School of Art The Australian National University between 1992 and 1997. In 1995 Bawden spent six months studying traditional European Oil Painting at The China National Academy of Fine Art, Hangzhou, China, a very formative experience for the young artist- developing a sense of the importance and power of beauty in art (as a transformative quality), through conversation with his Chinese peers. Bawden's graduation work explored the suppression and emergence of homosexual desire, making work spanning graffiti, mixed media paintings and a street poster project incorporating at least 2000 photocopies pasted up on the streets of Sydney and Canberra, like a dog marking his territory. Bawden was included in 'Hatched-National Graduate Show', [Perth Institute of Contemporary Art] in 1998. Between 1996 and 1998 Bawden was a member of ACME performance group, (initiated by the inspirational, late sculptor David Watt,) performing simultaneous, individual performance with 17 fellow students and graduates of Canberra School of Art, engaging aspects of the absurd, object performance and site specific works.

== Career ==
Bawden's sculptural-installation 'esque-thoughts brought forth by our fingers' gained him his first wide exposure in the '2001 National Sculpture Prize and exhibition' at the National Gallery of Australia, Canberra. This series of work formed Bawden's first solo show at GRANTPIRRIE, Sydney in 2002. This exhibition led to the collection of four of Bawden's works by Queensland Art Gallery and inclusion in their 2003 exhibition 'Colour'. In 2003 Bawden was invited to the 'Creative New Zealand' residence at Dunedin Public Art Gallery, New Zealand, producing the exhibition 'the spring tune'. In 2004 Bawden was awarded the inaugural ABN AMRO Emerging Artist Award with his sculpture 'Striated landscape- sunset' recalling the slowly evolving pinnacles and striking colours of the Central Australian landscape. Bawden returned to Beijing in late 2005 sharing a 3-month studio residency at Red Gate Gallery, artist in residency program, with Sydney artist Nell. During this Beijing residency Bawden performed a site specific work 'to hold a bowl of water level' at the exhibition, 'Demolish? Demolish. Demolish!' protesting at the Suo Jia Cun artist village Beijing. The simple performance explored the poetics of the Chinese language, enacting the literal meaning of the expression 'to hold a bowl of water level'- a metaphor meaning 'to see things from both sides.' During 2007 Bawden was included in two major surveys of contemporary Australian Art, touring Australia: 'Strange Cargo'- works from the Newcastle Region Art Gallery and 'Artbank- celebrating 25 years' (which included Bawden's sculpture 'the monsters (the spirit of the beehive)' collected by the Australian government initiative Artbank in 2004.) In 2009 Bawden was awarded The Wynne Prize at Art Gallery of New South Wales for his sculpture 'the amorphous ones (the vast colony of our being)' 2008, whilst showing simultaneously in 'I Walk the Line - New Australian Drawing' at the Museum of Contemporary Art, Sydney.

== Collections ==
- Artbank, Sydney.
- Newcastle Region Gallery, NSW.
- Queensland Art Gallery.
- National Gallery of Australia, Education lending collection.
- Macquarie Bank.
- Dunedin Public Art Gallery, New Zealand.
- ABN Amro, Sydney.
