= Wladyslaw Dutkiewicz =

Polish-Australian artist and theatre director

Władysław Dutkiewicz (21 February 1918 – 2 October 1999) was a Polish-born Australian artist and theatre director. Known for his expressionist and abstract paintings, in the 1950s and 1960s, Dutkiewicz was widely regarded as a leader of the modernist movement in Adelaide, South Australia.

== Early life and education ==
Wladyslaw Dutkiewicz was born on 21 February 1918 in Stara Sil (then in Poland, now Ukraine). Two of four brothers were also artists: Jan Dutkiewicz (1911–1985, Poland) and Ludwik Dutkiewicz (1921–2008, Australia).

He studied at the Academy of Fine Arts in Kraków, Poland, from 1935 to 1937, and then at the École des Beaux-Arts in Paris, France, from 1937 to 1938.

In 1939, he joined the Grand Theatre, Lwów, in Poland (now Lviv in Ukraine).

== Career ==
Dutkiewicz emigrated to Australia in 1949.

He was a painter, sculptor, actor, stage designer, and theatre director. On arriving in Adelaide, South Australia, he designed sets for several plays, then from 1956, following injuries received in a traffic accident for some years was forced to give up painting and returned to stage production.

Drawing on war-time experience as a director of the Grand Theatre, and of his own theatre in DP camps in Bavaria after the war, he formed the Art Studio Players in Adelaide, working with the "Method", from 1959 to 1962. He also directed two plays for the University of Adelaide Theatre Guild, in 1959 and 1967, and later appeared as an actor in several television dramas for Crawford Productions in Melbourne.

In the 1950s and 60s he was widely regarded as a leader of the modernist movement in Adelaide. He was a member of the Royal South Australian Society of Arts (RSASA).

== Awards ==
Dutkiewicz

- 1951: Winner, Cornell Prize (Contemporary Art Society of South Australia
- 1953: Runner up, Cornell Prize
- 1955: Finalist, Dunlop Prize
- 1956: Finalist, Blake Prize for Religious Art
- 1956: Co-winner, The Advertiser Prize, with Erica McGilchrist
- 1958: Finalist, Helena Rubinstein Travelling Art Scholarship Exhibition

He was also awarded gold and silver medals at the Royal Adelaide Exhibitions 1952 in 1957, and was awarded grants from the South Australian Government in 1976 and 1993.

== Exhibitions ==
Between 1946 and 1990, his work was included in 90 solo and group exhibitions, among the latter in Germany, 1946; England, 1954, 1961; and the United States in 1961. His work was included in an exhibition for the 1956 Summer Olympics held in Melbourne, at the National Gallery of Victoria (NGV). Most of his exhibited works were expressionist and abstract paintings.

Other exhibitions included: Survey 1, NGV, 1958; 1st Helena Rubinstein Travelling Art Scholarship, Art Gallery of New South Wales, 1958; Tasmanian Museum and Art Gallery, 1959; Heide Museum of Modern Art, Melbourne, 1961, 1996–1997; New Directions, Newcastle City Art Gallery in Newcastle, New South Wales, 1962; Critics' Choice, Contemporary Art Society of South Australia, Adelaide, 1967; South Australian painters, Adelaide Festival Centre, 1974; 50 Years of SA Art, Art Gallery of South Australia (AGSA), 1978; Painting in South Australia Today, AGSA, 1981; Five Polish Artists in Adelaide, Adelaide Festival Centre, 1986; Polish-Australian Artists, Adelaide Festival Centre 1994–1995; Charles Nodrum Gallery, Melbourne, 1985, 1990; Adelaide Town Hall, 1993–94; 20th Century Style: Furniture, AGSA, 2003; and two or three person exhibitions at Royal SA Society of Arts Gallery, Adelaide, 1951; University of Adelaide, 1966; and Kensington Gallery, Adelaide 1991.

He held retrospective exhibitions at RSASA in 1961; at Lidums Gallery, Adelaide, 1974; Greenhill Galleries, 1989; Hilton International Hotel, 1991; RSASA in 1993 and 2005; and BMG Art in 1996.

== Personal life and death ==
Throughout World War II, Dutkiewicz worked for the Polish Resistance, and was taken prisoner by both the Soviets and the Nazis.

Dutkiewicz died on 2 October 1999 in Adelaide.

He had five children, three of whom have careers as artists: Michal (born 1955; illustrator and comic book artist); Adam (born 1956; art critic, historian, and painter), and Ursula Dutkiewicz (installation artist, ceramist, and sculptor).

Adam Dutkiewicz founded WAV Publications in the 1980s. He has worked as art critic for The Advertiser, Business Review Weekly, Art Monthly Australasia, and The Independent Weekly in Adelaide. He specialises in post-war modernism in South Australia, and has authored several monographs on the topic, including one about his father, titled A Matter of Mind: an Introduction to the Art of Wladyslaw Dutkiewicz (1918-1999), published in 2006. He has also held several exhibitions of his own paintings.
