= List of Australian art awards =

Main art awards by organisations based in Australia

This List of Australian art awards covers the main art awards given by organisations based in Australia. Most are for Australian art but some are open to artists from elsewhere.

Award	Sponsor	Notes
Archibald Prize	Art Gallery of New South Wales	First major prize for portraiture in Australian art
Australian Photographic Portrait Prize	Art Gallery of New South Wales	Discontinued in 2007
Bald Archy Prize	Museum of the Riverina, Wagga Wagga	Parody of the Archibald Prize
Basil Sellers Art Prize	Basil Sellers Exhibition Centre, Moruya	A national biennial acquisitive art prize for Australian artists working in painting, drawing and printmaking, established in 2004.
Blake Prize	Casula Powerhouse Arts Centre	Focus on spiritual arts
Bowness Photography Prize	Monash Gallery of Art	
Brett Whiteley Travelling Art Scholarship	Art Gallery of New South Wales	Includes three-month residency at the Cite Internationale des Arts in Paris
the churchie emerging art prize	Institute of Modern Art	Since 1987; formerly at Griffith University Art Gallery (now Museum)
Clemenger Contemporary Art Award	Art Gallery of New South Wales	1993-2009 (no longer awarded)
Cornell Prize	Cornell family	South Australia, from 1951 to 1965
Dobell Prize	Art Gallery of New South Wales	No longer awarded
Doug Moran National Portrait Prize	Doug Moran	Annual Australian portrait prize
Fleurieu Art Prize	South Australia wineries	Named for the Fleurieu Peninsula
Fremantle Print Award	Little Creatures Brewery	
Gallipoli Art Prize	Gallipoli Memorial Club	Acquisitive art prize commemorating the Gallipoli campaign of the First World War, awarded annually.
Glover Prize	John Glover Society	For paintings of the landscape of Tasmania
Gold Coast Art Prize	Gold Coast City Art Gallery	
Helen Lempriere National Sculpture Award	Helen Lempriere Bequest	Defunct since 2009
Helena Rubinstein Portrait Prize	Helena Rubinstein Foundation)	no longer awarded
Helpmann Awards	Live Performance Australia	For live entertainment and performing arts
Impact Awards	Performing Arts Connections Australia	Presenter/venue & Producer Awards (Performing Arts)
Josephine Ulrick and Win Schubert Photography Award	HOTA Gallery	Biennial acquisitive award for contemporary Australian photography.
John Fries Award	Copyright Agency	Emerging visual artists
Kennedy Prize	Kennedy Arts Foundation	Annual Australian arts award of $25,000
Kilgour Prize	Newcastle Art Gallery	$50,000 figurative and portrait art competition
The Ledger Awards		Named after pioneering Australian cartoonist Peter Ledger (1945–1994)
Mandorla Art Award	New Norcia Monastery Museum and Art Gallery	Christian art
John McCaughey Prize	National Gallery of Victoria; Art Gallery of New South Wales	1957–
Melrose Prize	South Australian Society of Arts	Prize for portraiture instituted in 1921
Mornington Peninsula Regional Gallery Works on Paper Award	Mornington Peninsula Regional Gallery	Contemporary art made on, or with, paper
Mosman Art Prize	Mosman Town Council	
Muswellbrook Art Prize	Muswellbrook Regional Arts Centre	
National Aboriginal & Torres Strait Islander Art Award	Museum and Art Gallery of the Northern Territory	
National Capital Art Prize	ACT	Prizes in four categories: Open, First Nations, Landscape and Student
National New Media Art Award	Gallery of Modern Art, Brisbane	
National Photographic Portrait Prize	National Portrait Gallery (Canberra)	
Portia Geach Memorial Award	The Trust Company, Perpetual	Prize for Australian female portraitists
Ramsay Art Prize	Art Gallery of South Australia	$100,000 prize for contemporary artists under 40 years old
Ranamok Glass Prize	Andy Plummer and Maureen Cahill	Defunct from 2015
Salon des Refusés (Archibald)	S.H. Ervin Gallery	Rejected submissions to the Archibald Prize
Sculpture by the Sea	Sculpture by the Sea	
Sidney Myer Performing Arts Awards	Sidney Myer Fund	
Sir John Sulman Prize	Art Gallery of New South Wales	
Solar art prize	Royal Society of the Arts, South Australia	Climate change themes
South Australian Ruby Awards	Government of South Australia	Named for Dame Ruby Litchfield
Stanley Award	Australian Cartoonists' Association	Annual comics award
Stencil Art Prize	Marrickville Council etc.	Includes international stencil artists
Waterhouse Natural Science Art Prize	South Australian Museum	For art with a science theme
Wynne Prize	Art Gallery of New South Wales	Landscape painting or figure sculpture art prize

== See also ==
- Lists of art awards
