= Kennedy Award =

Kennedy Award(s) or Kennedy Prize may refer to:

- Harrison H. Kennedy Award, an American high school football award in West Virginia
- Kennedy Awards (journalism), Australian journalism awards
- Kennedy Prize (art), an Australian art prize, see List of Australian art awards

== See also ==
- Brian Kennedy Award, a UK award for contribution to gay and lesbian communities
- Byron Kennedy Award, an Australian award for technical achievement in film and TV, part of AACTA Awards
- Edward M. Kennedy Prize for Drama, of which the inaugural prize was won by Robert Schenkkan
- Graham Kennedy Award for Most Outstanding Newcomer, an Australian award, one of the Logie television awards
- Jimmy Kennedy Award, one of the Ivor Novello Awards for musical composition
- John F. Kennedy Award, awarded at the Holyoke Saint Patrick's Day Parade in Holyoke, Massachusetts, U.S.
- Ken Kennedy Award, an American computing award established in 2009
- Robert F. Kennedy Award for Excellence in Public Service, awarded at the Harvard Kennedy School to a graduating student each year
- Robert F. Kennedy Journalism Award, an American award for journalism established in 1968
- Robert F. Kennedy Human Rights Award, an American human rights award created in 1984
- Serena McDonald Kennedy Fiction Award, an American literary award
- Thomas Kennedy Award, an award honoring former members of the Maryland House of Delegates
