= Ian Gentle =

Australian artist (1945–2009)

Ian Robertson Gentle (28 September 1945 – 30 December 2009) was an Australian artist who won the Blake Prize in 1979. Gentle's primary medium was eucalyptus branches, which he used to create sculptural installations that mimic drawing in the air.

== Early life and training ==
Ian Gentle was born in Preston on 28 September 1945 to Jack and Phyllis Gentle. In 1958 the family moved to Healesville, Victoria, where his father built the family home. Gentle attended Lilydale High School, followed by Healesville High School, leaving school in 1964.

In the 1960s Gentle traveled to Mt Isa, Queensland, to play football and work in the mines. By the 1970s he traveled south and moved to Sydney, where he lived in his car in Kings Cross and enrolled in Bankstown TAFE for a year. During this time he completed his HSC.

In 1974 Gentle enrolled in St George TAFE in the National Arts School course when PM Gough Whitlam introduced free tertiary education in Australia. In 1976, Gentle began studying at the National Art School, Darlinghurst, graduating with a Diploma of Fine Art in 1978.

Gentle was awarded a Master of Creative Arts from the University of Wollongong in 1995, and later was admitted as an Honorary Fellow at the University of Wollongong in 2008.

== Career ==
As an artist, Gentle took inspiration from Arte Povera, which makes sculptural assemblages from everyday found materials. Gentle worked across multiple mediums, including sculpture, drawing, painting, printmaking and installation. Gentle's signature style were sculptural installations constructed from scavenged eucalyptus branches that were fused using wire, nails and putty into elegant stick drawings.

Gentle's work is held in many public and private collections both nationally and internationally, including the Art Gallery of New South Wales, the Art Gallery of South Australia, Sydney College of the Arts, Wollongong City Gallery, University of Wollongong, Griffith University, the Art Gallery of Western Australia, Artbank, Snowy Mountains Authority, Sydney College of Advanced Education, IBM Collection, Neiman Marcus (Dallas, USA), and Taipei Fine Arts Museum (Taiwan).

Gentle had his first exhibition in a commercial gallery in 1975 at Stairs Gallery, on Crown Street in Wollongong, and also won the Ashfield Art Award. In 1977 he won the United Telecasters Sculpture Prize, and in 1979 he won the Blake Prize for Religious Art, an Australian art prize awarded for art that explores spirituality. It was during this time that Gentle moved to the New South Wales South Coast, living in Jamberoo, next to painter Guy Warren and sculptor Bert Flugelman.

During the 1980s, Gentle taught at West Wollongong TAFE Art School and the National Art School East Sydney TAFE. Gentle exhibited widely throughout the 1980s in solo and group exhibitions, both nationally and internationally, including in Dallas and Houston, Texas, in the United States. In 1982, Gentle won the Visual Arts Board Grant, exhibited in the Adelaide Festival and was artist in residence at Contemporary Art Society Gallery, represented by Macquarie Galleries. In 1983, Gentle was the artist in resident at Praxis Contemporary Art Space, Freemantle, Western Australia, and in 1984, he won the Randwick Art Prize.

In 1986, Gentle moved to Clifton School of Arts, a two-story building that was constructed by the community of Clifton in 1911. Nestled at the foot of the Illawarra escarpment, it overlooks the ocean near the current day Seacliff Bridge. At the time, another prominent artist from Sydney, painter Brett Whiteley, had inquired about the space, however, the Clifton School of Arts Committee offered the place to Gentle. Here, Gentle set up his living quarters downstairs and studio upstairs, with his time at the Clifton School of Arts being one of the most productive and influential periods of his career. Gentle transformed this space, with bundles of sticks that he used in his sculptures piled against the walls or suspended from the ceiling, with sticks that were in the process of metamorphosing into sculptures making an interconnect network across the space.

Gentle was artist in residence at Long Bay Metropolitan Remand Centre in 1987. In 1988, Gentle had a solo exhibition at Wollongong City Gallery and was the Bi-Centennial Project Artist at Wollongong City Gallery. In 1989 Gentle won the Half Standard Grant and was held the King's School Residency in 1990.

In 1991, Gentle became the Head of Sculpture, in the Faculty of Creative Arts, University of Wollongong, where he would teach until 1997. Gentle's approach to education was free-spirited, seemingly contradictory to the academic format of a university. However, Gentle had a profound influence on those he taught, with many students becoming successful artists, curators, lecturers, and gallery directors who have worked at the highest levels in state, national and international institutions, including Lias Havilah, who is CEO of the Powerhouse Museum, and Glenn Barkley, who was Senior Curator at Museum of Contemporary Art Australia (2008–2014). During 1991, gentle also exhibited in 'Identities: Art from Australia', an international exhibition held in Taipei.

In 1992, Gentle held a major retrospective exhibition of his work at Wollongong City Gallery. It was during this time that Gentle was also awarded a Master of Creative Arts from the University of Wollongong.

In 1994, Gentle was the Bundanon artist in residency, and in 1995, Gentle spent time in the Northern Territory, where he was artist in residence at Yirrkala, in Arnhem Land.

In 1996, Gentle moved from his home and studio in the Clifton School of Arts, as the heritage building was facing demolition. Gentle hoped that the building could be saved and would remain in the hands of the local community, supporting the newly formed School of Arts Committee, which was tasked with fundraising and lobbying for the restoration of the building.

In 2000, Gentle bought a home in East Nowra, where he continued to create art until his death on 30 December 2009, at his home in East Nowra.
