= Mobile Cook's Galley, Museum of the Riverina =

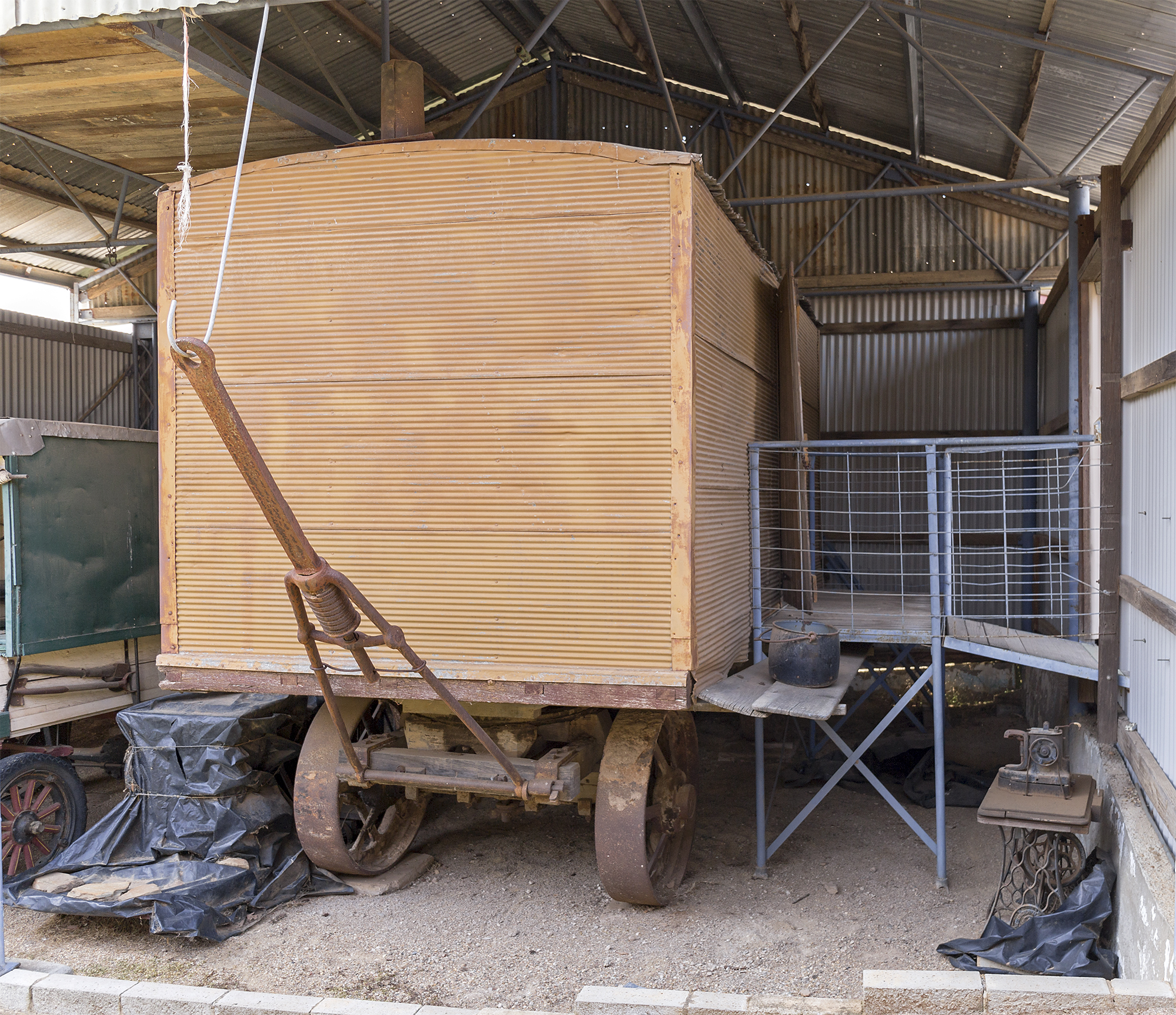
- Mobile Cook's Galley located at the Museum of the Riverina

- Location within New South Wales Location within Australia
- 35°07′40″S 147°22′03″E
- Location: Wagga Wagga Botanic Gardens, Baden Powell Drive, Wagga Wagga, City of Wagga Wagga, New South Wales, Australia

History
- Built: 1934

Site notes
- Architect(s): Jim McGilvray and Harold Fife
- Owner: City of Wagga Wagga

New South Wales Heritage Register
- Official name: Mobile Cook's Galley, Museum of the Riverina; Chaff cutting train
- Type: State heritage (movable / collection)
- Designated: 24 December 2004
- Reference no.: 1722
- Type: Kitchen
- Category: Farming and Grazing
- Builders: Jim McGilvray and Harold Fife

The Mobile Cook's Galley, part of the Museum of the Riverina, is a heritage-listed former mobile field kitchen and now museum collection and museum exhibit located in the Wagga Wagga Botanic Gardens, Baden Powell Drive, Wagga Wagga, in the Riverina region of New South Wales, Australia. It was designed and built in 1934 by Jim McGilvray and Harold Fife. It is also known as the Chaff cutting train. The property is owned by City of Wagga Wagga. It was added to the New South Wales State Heritage Register on 24 December 2004.

== History ==
The Cook's Galley was a mobile kitchen used to prepare food to feed the chaff cutting team owned and run by the Fife family during the 1930s and 1940s. Jim McGilvray (carpenter) and Harold Fife made it from recycled materials in 1934.

It consists of a carriage of four steel wheels with a drawbar for towing. The drawbar was attached to the back of a Roden or McClaren traction engine. On top of the carriage a rectangular cabin was fitted with two single full-length doors and a small window at one end. The kitchen contains a coal stove for cooking, a wooden cupboard for storage (below) and food preparation (above). Elsewhere in the kitchen are a number of wooden packing cases, food bins, cooking and eating utensils, fire tools and pitching forks.

=== History of the Fife family business ===
The origins of this particular branch of the Fife family go back to William Fife (1802-1880) who lived on a moderate 4.9-hectare (12-acre) farm at Drumcullion, County Fermanagh, Ireland. All five surviving children of his first marriage to wife Bessie (née Nixon 1807-1850) immigrated to New South Wales, Australia between 1859 and 1865. The aftermath of the Great Famine, the death of their mother, their father remarrying and better prospects in an overseas colony were all contributing to factors to them leaving Ireland.

The Keenan family, their neighbours in Ireland, had a daughter in Goulburn, New South Wales, who agreed to sponsor the new migrants - Faithy (1836-1903), Nixon (1840-1916), John (1838-1874), George (1848-1916) and Eliza (1846-1939). Their ages on arrival were 23, 19, 24, 14 and 19 respectively. Harold's great grandfather, Nixon started work as a yardman in a hotel, then became a carrier driving a bullock team between Sydney and Cooma. Later he bought and worked land in the vicinity of Goulburn. He married Elizabeth Cole (1849-1879) in 1870 who bore him six children.

Harold's grandfather, William (1871-1956), the eldest son of Nixon, was the first of the family to operate a chaff cutting business. He also bred horses, worked as a railway line contractor during lean times, and a farmer in later life. He suffered the unfortunate accident of having his left foot crushed by the Buffalo Pitts Traction engine which drove his chaff cutting plant. He married Mary Jane Whittaker (1874-1904) in 1896 and they had two sons William Clyde (1897-1971) and James Nixon (1898-1972), Harold's father and uncle respectively who played a major role in the family's chaff cutting, produce store and bakery businesses in Wagga Wagga.

It was while working on his father's (William's Snr) chaff cutting plant at Sherwin's Flat, Tarago, that Harolds' father met his future wife, and Harold's mother, Myrtle Wyatt.

In about 1919 Harold's father, William Clyde, moved to Wagga Wagga to work for Les Howard who operated a chaff cutting plant. (Howard also originated from Goulburn). He was paid one shilling per ton and had an average weekly wage of 2 pounds 8 shillings. James Nixon (1898-1972), William's younger brother and Harold's uncle, joined him. Initially they camped in the Jockey's Room at the pony racecourse where Norton Street is now located and on the site which in years to come would house their Chaff Mill and Bulk Store.

Harold and his mother joined his father and uncle in Wagga and with good prospects in the chaff industry persuaded their Uncle Tom, who lived in Goulburn, to purchase Les Howard's chaff cutting plant. For a number of years they worked for Uncle Tom before buying the plant from him and establishing Fife Bros in 1925. Tom Fife still lived in Goulburn so the sale to his nephews suited him. For almost three decades the family business travelled rural New South Wales cutting hay under contract to James Dunn Ltd., Stockman and Kleinig & Co., Kerridge & McMahon Ltd., and E.D. McMahon & Co.

Chaff cutting at the time was a huge industry as motor trucks were only starting to become widespread and there were big markets for chaff in Sydney, in the coal fields of New South Wales and Roma Street, Brisbane. In these centres household deliveries were still done by horse-drawn vehicles and as the mines were not fully mechanised pit ponies were still in use. With increasing prosperity the family bought their first of three Cliff and Bunting chaff cutters in 1927 and featured it at the Wagga Wagga Show.

Their first vehicle was a Model T Ford which Clyde used in the evenings, after completing his daily stint on the plant, to travel between plants to deliver spare parts, bags, provisions and meat. A Chevrolet Utility was purchased from Minty's Dealership, Wagga Wagga in 1927.

Crop failures, labour strikes and the depression brought difficult times and the chaff cutting plant stood in the backyard of the family's No.9 Shaw Street home for many years. During these tough times Harold's father took labouring work on the roads with the Wagga Wagga Municipal Council and as a fettler with the New South Wales Railways. His mother collected the fat from the Galley and made it into soap and also sold it to the soap works in town to earn much needed income. Around 1940 the brothers purchased the Swan Bakery and soon owned and operated four shops drawing on the labour of various family members.

Irene Wealand, Harold's aunt, remembers his mother making attractive and warm Wagga rugs from chaff bags for the household beds. The chaff bags were opened and filled with old woollen garments, sandwiched together sewn together and then covered with a heavy patterned material.

In 1949 the brothers dissolved their business partnership. Harold and his father held onto the chaff cutting plant and the produce store, which had been established in 1945, at 45 Baylis Street, while his uncle (James) took over the two bakehouses and four retail outlets and formed J. N. Fife and Sons with his boys, Ken and Edgar (Ned). The business was expanded with new partners and later known as the Riverina Baking Co. A large bakehouse was built in Edward Street behind the Wagga Flour Mill. A chaff mill was established at The Rock in 1945. This was a result of criticism levelled at the chaff cutters whose machinery due to their heavy steel wheels damaged the roads. A second mill was established at a site in Norton Street which lasted for about five years as difficulties were still experienced with transporting hay from the farms to the mill the authorities been particularly strict on over wide loading. The focus of the business shifted to the produce store and fertiliser.

At the age of thirteen Harold joined his father in the chaff cutting plant. In his father's words, If he won't go to school, he might as well go to work! Harold started as a lunch boy and by his fourteenth birthday had moved to the chaff cutter been taught the ropes by the older men. At the age of eighteen (1937) a second plant was purchased and Harold put in charge. The plant was in Blayney when news of the outbreak of the World War II was made known. Harold enlisted and served for three years. In 1944 he was discharged under the Manpower Act and returned to the cutter. In later years he followed in the footsteps of his father and became a City Councillor and a Deputy Mayor of Wagga Wagga both serving for a period of 21 years. Harold's younger brother Wallace Clyde Fife (1929- ) went into politics and became the Member for Farrer.

Harold's uncle, James, was badly burnt, in 1939, when the steam box exploded he was working on. Painted with Gentian Violet he spent many weeks recuperating at home.

=== Regional context and details of chaff cutting industry ===
Chaff, as petrol is today, was a much-needed fuel when the horse was the primary source of power and transport on Riverina farms between the late 19th century and the end of Second World War. Horse numbers reached their peak in 1919 when there were two million horses in Australia - one horse for every two head of population. Over the next three decades the tractor gradually replaced them. To maintain their health and strength working horses needed to be fed three times per day. The most convenient form of fed was to cut hay into chaff and then mix it with other grains such as oats. One horse consumed about 5.1 tonnes (5 long tons) of feed per year. As a result, most farmers kept a proportion of their crops for feed which would amount to 81 tonnes (80 long tons) per annum if they had two 8-horse teams. Others are known to have cut more than 200 tonnes (200 long tons) a year.

Chaff was also stocked piled for periods of drought and used to feed cattle and sheep as well as horses. Additional demands for chaff came from teamsters and townspeople that used horses for transport. As a result of these demands for horse feed chaff cutting became a profitable business with a number of firms, of which the Fife brothers were one, operating in the Riverina.

The hay season usually stretched from early November until the end of January the following year. With the use of 1.5-to-2.4-metre (5 to 8 ft) binders, pulled by three horses, the hay was cut, tied into sheaves, and bundles of about ten sheaves, tied together to form a stook and left to dry. The stooks were then collected and carted to a site for the building of a haystack. Chaff cutting teams cut the hay into chaff either directly from the stooks in the paddock or from the haystacks. The Fife family plant consisted of a Roden or McLaren 8 horse power, two-cylinder traction engine, cook's galley, cliff and bunting chaff cutter, dobbin (or wagon), steam box, and water cart.

Linked together in this order they formed a train which moved from one farm to another around the district. On arriving at a farm the plant was set up next to the haystack(s). The farmer had to supply the wood and water for the steam traction engine which had a capacity of 300 gallons. Up to four Furphy carts of water were used per day. The ratio of wood needed per ton of chaff cut was 114,000 tonnes (112,000 long tons) of wood for one tonne of chaff. The wood was cut to 84-centimetre (2 ft 9 in) lengths for feeding into the furnace.

Stackmen, armed with pitching forks, passed the sheaves to a man at the steam box who cut the twine holding them together and feed the loose hay, with the help of a conveying mechanism, through the steam box 76 centimetres (30 in) long and 56 centimetres (22 in) wide. Steaming the hay before it was cut prevented it from breaking and greatly improved its quality. The steam was supplied from the steam engine through a pipe. When the hay reached the Chaff Cutter it was fed through a pair of rollers and cut. The cut hay fell onto a type of sieve, called a riddle board, which fed it onto an elevator taking it to a double chute of bagging cylinders. Long pieces of uncut hay fell onto a caving elevator which took it back through the cutters.

There were two bag sewers who in turn filled and sewed alternate bags. The machine would cut 1 or 2 bags of chaff per minute which after being sewn up were loaded straight onto a truck which depending on its size was allowed to carry 152, 184 or 220 bags. The blades of the cutter had to be sharpened or replaced at regular intervals and Harold prides himself at been able to change and set six knives within three minutes.

The traction engine supplied the steam box with steam as well as the power for driving the cutter. The pulley belt turning the drive wheels was 30 metres (100 ft) long and 1.8 metres (6 ft) wide and made of a compound of two or three ply leather sewn together with copper rivets. It cost A£100 (a pound a foot). It also generated a considerable amount of static electricity which made ones hair stand upright if you stood beneath it. The dobbin was either a three-wheel or four-wheel cart used to carry new bags, tarpaulins, sleeping equipment and spare parts. A horse drawn Furphy Cart was used to bring dam water to the engine for steaming purposes.

Drinking water and water used for cooking was stored in a 450-litre (100 imp gal) tank and two 200-litre (44 imp gal) drums were brought separately to the galley by Clyde Fife. The tank and drums were placed at the back of the galley.

Time spent on a farm varied from as short as a day to a week. On average the plant cut 41 tonnes (40 long tons) a day but they could reach 61 tonnes (60 long tons) if pushed to the limit.

The normal routine was an eleven-hour day, starting at 7:00am, stopping for a short smoke break at 9:00am, dinner between 12 noon and 1:00pm, a ten-minute tea break at 3:00pm and calling it a day around 6:00pm. The business operated for all but two weeks in the year and in good times the Fife family owned and operated two plants.

The routine of the cook was as follows: The wood stove was fired at 5:45am for a 6:30am breakfast to facilitate a 7:00am start. Because of the heavy labour involved breakfast consisted of one pound of sausage per man with toast and tea. Dinner consisted of roast meat, potatoes, carrots, parsnips and turnips with a sweet to end. The evening meal was usually cold meats and salads. Scones, jam tarts and biscuits were served during the mid-morning and mid-afternoon breaks. Tea appeared at all meals.

When the chaff cutting plant was in full production sixteen men were fed from the galley. When out in the field provisions were usually delivered on a Monday supplemented with fresh bread and meat on a Wednesday due to the absence of refrigeration.

Rates of pay for the various labourers were as follows:

- Water Joey: 4 pence plus food
- Stackmen: 4 pence plus food
- Steam Box Feeder: 4 pence plus food
- Cutter/Feeder: 5 pence plus food
- Bag Sewers: 6 pence plus food
- Cook: 2 pounds, 1 shilling per week, plus three pence per ton
- Driver: Retainer (not disclosed)
- Hammocks for the Cook and Engine Driver were strung beneath the Galley (chains still present) while the rest of the men made makeshift mattresses from bales of hay. Wagga Rugs were the principal source of warmth.

== Description ==
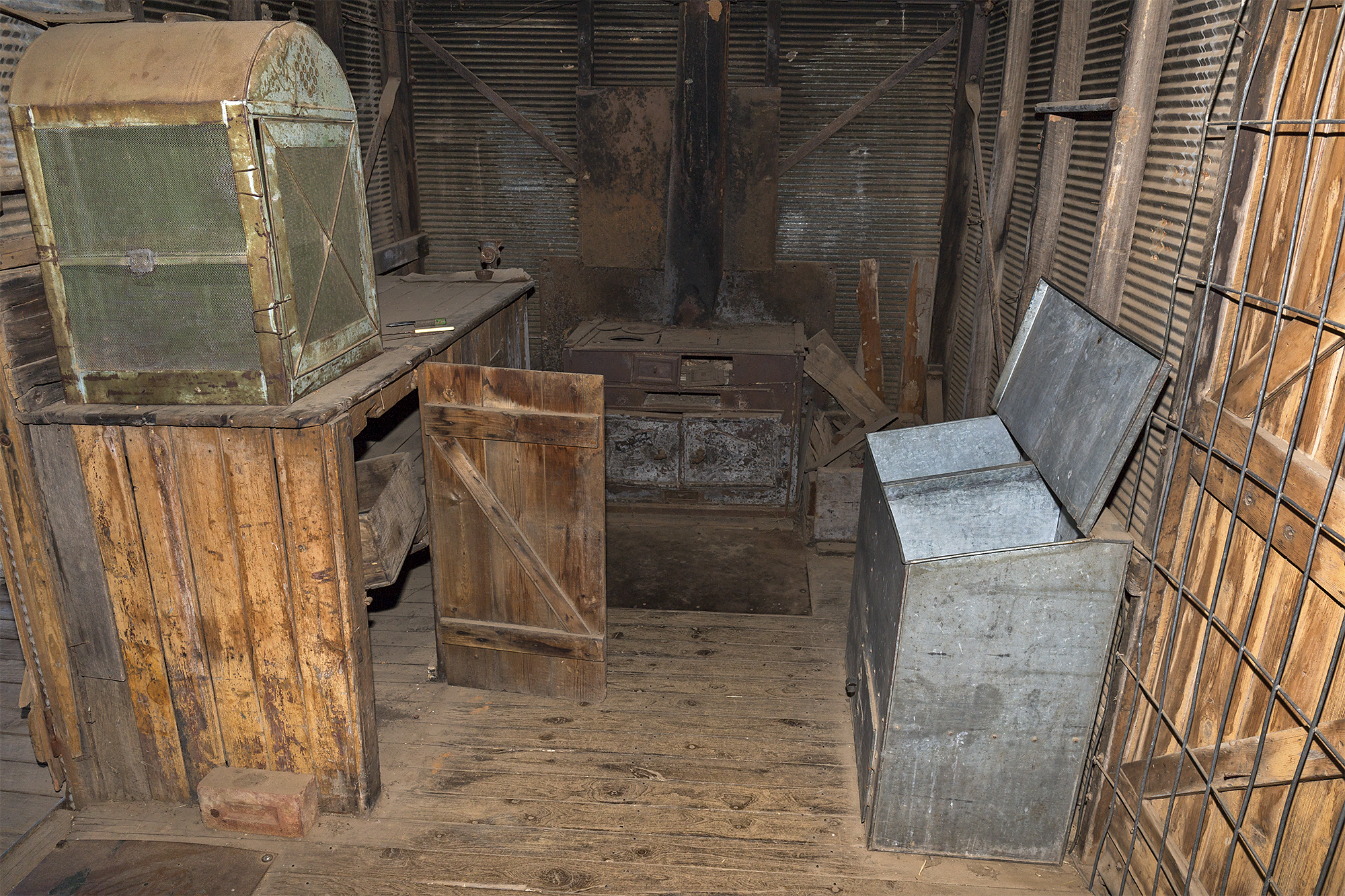
Interior of Mobile Cook's Galley

It consists of a carriage of four steel wheels with a drawbar for towing. The drawbar was attached to the back of a Roden or McClaren traction engine. On top of the carriage a rectangular cabin was fitted with two single full-length doors and a small window at one end. The kitchen contains a coal stove for cooking, a wooden cupboard for storage (below) and food preparation (above). Elsewhere in the kitchen are a number of wooden packing cases, food bins, cooking and eating utensils, fire tools and pitching forks.

The galley was built in 1935 and operated until 1954.

=== Condition ===
As at 22 October 2004, the item was intact and in a good, sound condition. With the exception of a number of new wooden planks on its rear platform, a material foot plate at its entrance, and a small number of nuts and bolts in the doors, it remains in original condition. This adds considerably to its value and importance as its surfaces and features retain their unique working characteristics.

The mobile galley is believed to be one of only two retained in NSW and has been retained substantially in its original built and used condition.

== Heritage listing ==
As at 14 June 2006, the Cook's Galley, as an element of the Fife family chaff cutting plant, was a significant item representing a historical phase of grain harvesting in the Riverina. It represents a period between the 1880s and 1940s that saw the dominance of horse-drawn power for rural farm operations and transport generally throughout NSW.

Chaff cutting provided fuel for horses which were the principle form of power and transport on farms and the cities during the late 19th and early 20th Centuries. They pulled the drays, wagons or a variety implements for the sowing, harvesting or transporting of wheat, machinery, for mining operations, and delivery of other produce.

With the rest of the chaff cutting plant having been broken up, the Cook's Galley remains a tangible example of the Fife chaff cutting business and about the men who worked this and similar machines on a number of farms in rural New South Wales. The family, great-grandchildren and grandchildren of Irish migrants, contributed to the rural economy and political life of the Riverina.

The item retains a high level of integrity and significant display and educational roles.

Mobile Cook's Galley, Museum of the Riverina was listed on the New South Wales State Heritage Register on 24 December 2004 having satisfied the following criteria.

The place is important in demonstrating the course, or pattern, of cultural or natural history in New South Wales.

The Cook's Galley was part of a larger chaff cutting plant owned and operated by the local Wagga Wagga Fife family. It represents a distinct stage in the NSW economy where horses played a seminal role in rural, manufacturing, mining and transport industries. In the days before motorised machinery such as tractors and lorries, securing chaff for horse feed was a critical task in servicing the State's animal labour force.

The place has a strong or special association with a person, or group of persons, of importance of cultural or natural history of New South Wales's history.

The Fife family chaff cutting "trains", that included a mobile cook's galley, played an important role in the harvesting of chaff for a thirty-year period. The teams were a common fixture on rural properties throughout the Riverina, Central West and North West of NSW.

The place is important in demonstrating aesthetic characteristics and/or a high degree of creative or technical achievement in New South Wales.

The Mobile Galley was an element in a travelling "train" that comprised a steam-powered traction engine that towed the kitchen, a chaff cutting machine, a dobbin (wagon), a steam box and a water cart. Collectively, the "train" showed a marked level of local ingenuity in the adaptation of existing vehicle types for a specific rural technological need. The mobile galley was hand built from an original stone wagon, with the introduction of a cabin area fitted out specifically to cook and store food in remote farm areas. It had to be self-contained and provide 3+ meals a day for periods extending up to seven days. While subject to harsh conditions, the survival of the vehicle in a near-original form is testimony to the inventiveness and skills of its builders, Jim McGilvray (carpenter) and Harold Fife of Wagga.

The place has a strong or special association with a particular community or cultural group in New South Wales for social, cultural or spiritual reasons.

Originating from Ireland and settling in Goulburn between 1859 and 1865, the Fife family remain a prominent family in the Riverina district. The Fife Brothers company was formed in Wagga during 1925, although family members had already settled and been working in the chaff industry there. The successful family business operated throughout NSW for some thirty years, surviving the Depression years and World War Two. The family diversified into chaff mill, bakery and produce areas, and several members played prominent roles in local and Federal politics.

Life in the chaff cutting industry involved long hard labour, and the provision of meals and refreshments through the mobile 'canteen's' played an important social role in the servicing and support of the local labour market.

The galley's integrity and retention by the original family which built and operated the vehicle contributes to its social significance values.

The place has potential to yield information that will contribute to an understanding of the cultural or natural history of New South Wales.

The Cook's Galley and original chaff cutting "train" has been effectively researched and interpreted and it is unlikely that significant new insights will be documented regarding its impact on past farming and agricultural practices.

The place possesses uncommon, rare or endangered aspects of the cultural or natural history of New South Wales.

The Cook's Galley is unique in NSW being one of only two known retained examples of a mobile farm kitchen and retains a high level of integrity. Now a fixture of the respected Museum of the Riverina, the Cook's Galley offers a unique opportunity to examine a past, defunct, way of rural life - the harvesting of chaff to provide feed for the working horse population of NSW. The importance of this industry is identified with the State's horse population of 1919 being 2.5 million - one for every two people in the State. With the widespread introduction of mechanized machinery on the farm, particularly following World War Two, the chaff industry was lost to the tide of petroleum and other fuel needs.

The place is important in demonstrating the principal characteristics of a class of cultural or natural places/environments in New South Wales.

The mobile cook's galley is today representative of a once commonplace rural activity in the grain harvesting areas of NSW. The growing, cutting, storage and processing of grains for chaff, supplied necessary horse feed and stock food reserves. The industry therefore played a significant underlying role in the development and support of the State's rural and general economies at a time that depended on horse-drawn power for many sectors of industry.
