= Dutkiewicz =

Dutkiewicz is a Polish surname. Notable people with the surname include:

- Adam Dutkiewicz (born 1977), American musician
- Adam Dutkiewicz (artist) (born 1956), Australian artist and art historian, son of Wladyslaw Dutkiewicz
- Adriana Dutkiewicz, Australian sedimentologist
- Edward Dutkiewicz (1961–2007), British artist
- Michal Dutkiewicz (born 1955), Australian illustrator, son of Wladyslaw Dutkiewicz
- Pamela Dutkiewicz (born 1991), German athlete
- Rafał Dutkiewicz (born 1959), Polish politician
- Ursula Dutkiewicz (born 1958), Australian ceramist, sculptor, daughter of Wladyslaw Dutkiewicz
- Wladyslaw Dutkiewicz (1918–1999), Polish-Australian artist and playwright
