= Blake Prize =

Australian art prize for spiritual art

- Date: 1951; 75 years ago
- Country: Australia
- Hosted by: The Blake Society (1951-2016); Casula Powerhouse (since 2016)
- Reward: A$35,000

Highlights
- Most awards: Eric Smith (six times)
- Inaugural winner: Justin O'Brien (1951)
- Website: Blake Prize

The Blake Prize, formerly the Blake Prize for Religious Art, is an Australian art prize awarded for art that explores spirituality. Since the inaugural prize in 1951, the prize was awarded annually from 1951 to 2015. Since 2016 it has been awarded biennially.

As of 2021, the non-acquisitive prize, awarded since 2016 by the Casula Powerhouse Arts Centre (CPAC), is worth A$35,000. In addition, CPAC awards the Blake Emerging Artist Prize, an acquisitive prize of A$6,000 (formerly the John Coburn Emerging Artist Award), and the Blake Established Artist Residency, which includes a residency and solo exhibition hosted by CPAC.

== History ==
The prize was established in Sydney in 1949 as an incentive to raise the standard of religious art and to find suitable work to decorate churches. It was founded by Jewish businessman Richard Morley, the Reverend Michael Scott SJ, a headmaster of Campion Hall, Point Piper, and subsequently rector of Aquinas College (a Catholic residential college for university students in North Adelaide), and lawyer M. Tenison. The Blake Prize is named after the artist and poet, William Blake. The inaugural Blake Prize was awarded by the Blake Society in 1951 to Justin O'Brien.

The Blake exhibitions have been a regular travelling exhibition around Australia, visiting various major cities and provincial galleries.

The award of the Blake Prize to Charles Bannon in 1954 for his Judas Iscariot was one of the most controversial in its history; this opened controversy over what constituted religious art and over "abstract expressionism" which threatened to overwhelm the exhibition.

In 2000, the prize shifted its focus from strictly religious art to an exploration of spirituality, and some of the entries proved controversial. In 2007, former prime minister John Howard and former Catholic archbishop of Sydney George Pell expressed disapproval of art works showing the Virgin Mary in a burqa, and a hologram of Christ morphing with Osama bin Laden. In 2008, The Australian's art critic Christopher Allen resigned from the judging panel over an entry by Adam Cullen showing the crucifixion of Christ.

The prize was known as the Blake Prize for Religious Art until its 56th edition in 2007, and was based at the National Art School in Darlinghurst at this time. For its 57th edition in 2008, it was rebranded the Blake Prize, subtitled "Exploring the spiritual and religious in art".

In 2008 the Blake Society, in collaboration with the New South Wales Writers' Centre (now Writing NSW), established the Blake Poetry Prize to link art and literature and to give Australian poets new possibilities to explore the nature of spirituality in the 21st century.

In 2011, Australian art historian, educator and exhibition curator Rosemary Crumlin authored a book documenting 60 years of the Blake Prize.

In 2012, the National Art School was replaced as exhibition partner by the National Trust's S. H. Ervin Gallery in Observatory Park, in Sydney's city centre, for the 61st edition of the awards.

In 2014 there were new commercial sponsors, and the venue partner became UNSW College of Fine Arts (now UNSW School of Art & Design).

The prize was administered by the Blake Society up till and including 2015. After the 63rd edition of the prize in January, chair Rod Pattenden said that it would not be able to continue owing to lack of sponsorship, suggesting that the prize was seen as "too open-minded" by religious organisations and "too religious" by secular people. In July, the Casula Powerhouse Art Centre (CPAC) and Liverpool City Council announced that they would be funding and managing the prize, with the exhibition and awards moving to Casula in Western Sydney. They promised that A$25,000 would be available in perpetuity.

In 2016 CPAC took over the prize for the 64th Blake Prize, and it became a biennial award. It now focuses on the broader spiritual arts rather than religious art. The Casula Powerhouse took over the Blake Poetry Prize in the same year.

== Blake Prize for Human Justice ==
From 2009 until 2014, the Blake Prize for Human Justice, worth A$5,000, was sponsored by the Maritime Union of Australia. The winners were:

- 2009: Dianne Coulter
- 2010: Fiona White
- 2011: Abdul Abdullah
- 2012: Saif Almurayati, a former refugee
- 2013: Franz Kempf AM
- 2014: Hedy Ritterman

== Current prizes ==
As of 2021, there are three prizes awarded by Casula Powerhouse:

- The Blake Prize, a non-acquisitive prize of A$35,000
- The Blake Emerging Artist Prize, an acquisitive prize of A$6,000 (formerly the John Coburn Emerging Artist Award)
- The Blake Established Artist Residency, a residency and solo exhibition, hosted by Casula Powerhouse

== List of winners ==
Ordinal	Year	Winner(s)	Name of work(s)	Notes
1	1951	Justin O'Brien	The Virgin Enthroned	
2	1952	Frank Hinder	Flight into Egypt	In the collection of the Art Gallery of Western Australia
3	1953	Michael Kmit	The Evangelist John Mark	
4	1954	Charles Bannon	Judas Iscariot	
5	1955	Donald Friend	St John and Scenes from the Apocalypse	
6	1956	Eric Smith	The Scourged Christ	
7	1957	Elwyn Lynn	Betrayal	
8	1958	Eric Smith	The Moment Christ Died	
9	1959	Eric Smith	Christ is Risen	
10	1960	John Coburn	Triptych of the Passion	
11	1961	Stanislaus Rapotec	Meditating on Good Friday	
12	1962	Eric Smith	Eucharistic Landscape	
13	1963	Leonard French	Ancient Fragments	
14	1964	Michael Kitching	Last Supper-Premonition	
15	1965	Asher Bilu	I Form Light and Create Darkness-Isaiah 45:7	
16	1966	Rodney Milgate	Ascension	
17	1967	Desiderius Orban	Hosanna	
18	1968	Roger Kemp	The Cross	
19	1969	Eric Smith	The Assassin's Creed	
20	1970	Roger Kemp	Denial	
20	1970	Eric Smith	Christ's Flesh: Living, Suffering and Resurrected	
21	1971	Desiderius Orban	Transition to Christianity	
22	1972	Joseph Szabo	Black Friday	
23	1973	Keith Looby	Your Motel Calvary Still Life Flowers	
24	1974	Stuart Maxwell	Christ at Emmaus	
24	1974	Ken Whisson	Tobias and the Angel	
25	1975	Rodney Milgate	Thoughts on Holy Thursday	
26	1976	David Voigt	Blue Requiem	
27	1977	John Coburn	Hozanna	
27	1977	Rodney Milgate	Tree	
28	1978	Noel Tunks	The First Friday Retreat	
29	1979	Ian Gentle and; Alex Trompf	Roadside Altar Piece Comas	
30	1980	Leonard French	Instruments for a Drama Meditation	
31	1981	David Voigt	Meditation	
32	1982	Mary Anne Coutts	In Mockery of Christ	
32	1982	Suzie Marston	Sunday School Work Books	
33	1983	Geoffrey Harvey and; Ann Taylor	The Offering	
34	1984	Mary Hall	The Spirit of God hovered brooding over the face of the waters	
35	1985	John Gould	Votives to Passion	
36	1986	Roger Akinin	The Day of Atonement, Scapegoat and Apostate	
37	1987	Ian Grant	The Monks Cloak	
37	1987	Alan Oldfield	A High and perpetual shewing of Christ's mother according to Julian of Norwich	
38	1988	Lise Floistad	This sign is a hidden treasure which desires to be known	
39	1989	Warren Breninger	Hail Mary	
40	1990	Gillian Mann	The Chest	
41	1991	Alan Oldfield	Raft III	
41	1991	Rosemary Valadon	Before the Fall	
42	1992	George Gittoes	Ancient Prayer	
43	1993	John Davis	Some Thoughts on a Miracle	
44	1994	Hilarie Mais	Veiling Silence	
45	1995	George Gittoes	The Preacher – Kibeho Massacre Series, Rwanda	
46	1996	Rachel Ellis	Woman at Jesus' feet	
47	1997	Thomas Spence	Christmas Day 1914 (God's Truce)	
48	1998	John Adair	One Dark Night (from St John of the Cross Poem Dark Night of the Soul)	
−	1999	not awarded		
49	2000	Frances Belle Parker	The Journey	
50	2001	Lachlan Warner	Vitrine of lightweight (Sunyata), disposable (annica) Buddhas, in a range of festive colours, postures and mudras	
51	2002	Hilton McCormick	The Harvest	
52	2003	Shoufay Derz	Linking Back (Part 1)	
53	2004	AñA Wojak	Pieta (Dafur)	
54	2005	James Powditch	God is in the Details (Intelligent Design)	
54	2005	Louise Rippert	Dance	
55	2006	Euan Macleod	Untitled Landscape with Figure	
56	2007	Shirley Purdie	Stations of the Cross	
57	2008	David Tucker	A Local Girl Comes Home	
58	2009	Angelica Mesiti	Rapture (silent anthem)	
59	2010	Leonard Brown	If you put your ear close, you’ll hear it breathing	
60	2011	Khaled Sabsabi	Naqshbandi Greenacre Engagement	(3 channel video)
61	2012	Fabian Astore	The Threshold	
61	2012	Eveline Kotai	Writing on air	
62	2013	Trevor Nickolls	Metamorphosis	
63	2014	Richard Lewer	Worse Luck I'm Still Here	
Changed to biennial award
64	2016	Yardena Kurulkar	Kenosis 2015	
65	2018	Tina Havelock Stevens	Giant Rock	
66	2020 (2021)	Leyla Stevens	Kidung, a 3-channel video work	Awarded 13 February 2021, due to the COVID-19 pandemic
67	2022	SJ Norman	Cicatrix	
68	2024	Shireen Taweel	Shoe Bathers	
69	2026	Tarik Ahlip	On Her Return (Facial Burns and a Garland of Flowers)	

== See also ==
- Phoenix Prize for spiritual art
- Art of Australia
