= Luke Cornish =

Australian stencil artist (born 1979)

- Born: 1979 (age 46–47); Canberra, ACT, Australia
- Style: Street art
- Website: elkstencils.art

Luke Cornish (born 1979) is an Australian stencil artist, also known as E.L.K. In 2012 Cornish became the first stencil artist to become a finalist in the Archibald Prize. He was also awarded the Holding Redlich People's Choice Award at the Archibald Prize Salon des Refusés in 2017, the Churchill Fellowship in 2013 and was a finalist in the Sulman prize in the same year. In 2011, he was a finalist in the Metro Art Prize, won the Australian Stencil Art prize in 2010, and in 2008 he won the most popular stencil at Melbourne Stencil Festival. In 2012, Cornish's short film, 'Me- We', which documented the process and construction of his portrait of Father Bob Maguire for entry into the 2012 Archibald Prize, was shortlisted in the Tropfest Awards Film Festival. Other notable achievements include being selected for 2012's Project 5 charity auction, a large involvement in 2011's Outpost Project. Cornish has exhibited his work in capital and regional cities in Australia, and in major international cultural centres, including Paris, London, Rome, Los Angeles and Amsterdam.

== Career ==
Growing up in Canberra, Cornish worked as a sign writer and landscape designer before taking up stencil art as a hobby in the early-2000s. All of his work is done by hand through cutting out sheets of recycled acetate with a scalpel. Some of Cornish's stencils contain over 100 layers and up to 243 colours. The subject of his 2012 Archibald final work, Father Bob Maguire, contains over 30 layers and the work was influenced by Cornish's association of Maguire with his own grandfather.

Cornish has made multiple visits to Syria, Lebanon and Iran. In early 2017 he co-founded the 'For Syrias Children' Charity organisation, which works in conjunction with Non-Government Organisations on the ground in Syria, raising funds for Syrian children affected by conflict. In 2017 Cornish curated an urban art auction to raise funds for the children of Syria.

== Exhibition history (solo shows) ==
- 2026: Luke Cornish (E.L.K): two decades of stencil art, Deakin University Art Gallery, Melbourne
- 2025: Terminal Lucidity, Precinct 75, Sydney
- 2023: Dissimulation, Oshi Gallery, Melbourne
- 2022: Edge of Chaos, Barangaroo, Sydney
- 2022: Stamp Duty Blues, Black Box Artspace, Wollongong
- 2021: Don't Shoot the Messenger, aMBUSH Gallery, Canberra
- 2019: Have a Go, aMBUSH Gallery, Canberra
- 2019: The Sea, Bondi Pavilion Gallery, Sydney
- 2018: The Sea, Lock Up Gallery, Newcastle
- 2018: (In)Appropriate, Metro Gallery, Melbourne
- 2018: No place like home, Tuggeranong Arts Centre, Canberra
- 2017: Zero to the left, Metro Gallery, Melbourne
- 2017: Road to Damascus, Nanda\Hobbs Contemporary, Sydney
- 2016: Vanishing Point, Nanda\Hobbs Contemporary, Sydney
- 2016: Concrete Jungle, Metro Gallery, Melbourne
- 2014: Louder than words, Stolen Space, London
- 2014: Clusterfuck, Metro Gallery, Melbourne
- 2014: Sex & Death, w/ Will Coles, Art Equity, Sydney
- 2013: Before Afghanistan, Art Equity, Sydney
- 2012: Not with it..., Metro Gallery, Melbourne
- 2011: Look what you made me do...., Brunswick Street Gallery, Melbourne
- 2011: This is why we can't have nice things..., Oh Really Gallery, Newtown, Sydney
- 2010: How you like me now Bitch?, Front Gallery, Canberra

== Awards and collections ==
- 2025: Archibald Prize, AGNSW, Finalist
- 2025: Deakin University Collection, Melbourne (acquisition)
- 2024: Gallipoli Art Prize, winner
- 2019: Archibald Prize, Finalist
- 2018: Salon de Refusés, SH Ervine Gallery, Sydney
- 2017: Salon de Refusés, SH Ervine Gallery, Sydney (Winner: Holding Redlich People's Choice Award)
- 2016: Australian War Memorial, Canberra (acquisition)
- 2015: Gold Coast Art Gallery, QLD (acquisition)
- 2014: Bond University Collection, QLD
- 2014: Corrigan Collection
- 2013: Churchill Fellowship, Awardee
- 2013: National Portrait Gallery, Canberra (acquisition)
- 2013: Sulman prize, Finalist
- 2012: Moran Portrait prize, semi-finalist
- 2012: Archibald prize, Finalist
- 2012: Tropfest, shortlisted
- 2011: Metro Art Prize, Finalist
- 2010: Australian Stencil Art Prize, Winner
- 2009: Ballarat Gallery of Modern Art (acquisition)
- 2009: Australian Stencil art prize, Runner up
- 2008: Melbourne Stencil Festival, People's choice
