= Jacqueline Hick =

Australian artist (1919-2004)

- Born: 8 December 1919; Adelaide, Australia
- Died: 11 May 2004 (aged 84); Adelaide, Australia
- Education: Girls' Central Art School; Adelaide Teachers College
- Known for: Painting, printmaking
- Movement: Social Realism, Surrealism
- Awards: Melrose Memorial Prize, Cornell Prize

Jacqueline Hick (8 December 1919 – 11 May 2004) was an Australian painter, known for her work depicting human figures and the Australian landscape. She is the subject of the 2013 book Jacqueline Hick: Born Wise, and her work is held in the permanent collections of many galleries in Australia.

== Early life and education ==
Jacqueline Hick was born on 8 December 1919 in Adelaide, South Australia, the first child of Horace Barnett Hick and Julia Caroline Hick-Thomson.

Hick studied at the Girls' Central Art School from 1934 to 1927 (a school within the school that became the South Australian School of Art. in her 3rd year in 1937 She did her teachers training at Adelaide Teachers' College in 1939-40

She also studied at the Central School of Art and Design in London, and the Académie Montmartre in Paris. Her time in England, France, and Italy spanned the period between 1948 and 1950.

== Career ==
Hick taught at her alma mater, the South Australian School of Arts and Crafts, from 1941 to 1945, where she was noted for being one of three teachers "instrumental in introducing students to modernism", before resigning to work full-time as an artist.

She was a founding member of the Contemporary Art Society of South Australia in 1942. In January 1943, one of her works was exhibited in an "all Australian anti-Fascist" art exhibition in the South Australian National Gallery. Along with two others, her painting was acquired by the gallery.

In the 1950s, Hick worked in the Hexagon group with fellow Australia artists John Dowie, David Dridan, Francis Ray Thompson, Douglas Roberts, and Pam Cleland. Dowie sculpted a bronze of Hick that was in the National Gallery of Victoria, and wrote a poem in her honor. She also trained with the Australian artist Ivor Hele, and in the 1960s studied in the USA and Mexico.

From 1968 until 1976 Hick was a trustee at the Art Gallery of South Australia, the second woman to hold this position after Ursula Hayward.

== Art practice and themes ==
Hick was influenced by the art of Mary P. Harris and John Goodchild, and inspired European artists Goya, Honoré Daumier, and Käthe Kollwitz as well as Australian painters William Dobell and Russell Drysdale. She identified with Australian artists working on the themes of "isolation, drought, exploration, pioneers, and colonial crime". Her work ranges from landscape to portrait. She increasingly showed the human suffering of the Indigenous Australians, and the adverse effects of metropolitan life on its inhabitants.

She was primarily a figure painter in oils, but also created prints, set designs, and enamels.

== Recognition and honours ==
In 1953 Hick won a prize in a Dunlop competition for her watercolour works, and won again in 1955 and 1956.

In 1958, she won the Melrose Memorial Prize, a prize for portraits given by the South Australian Society of Arts. She won the Cornell Prize twice, in 1958 for her piece Horse Destroyed, and in 1960 for Corridor.

In 1960 she also won the Caltex prize at the Adelaide Festival of the Arts.

In 1962 and again in 1964 she won the Maude Vizard-Wholohan Prize.

In 1991, Hick's life and work were the subject of an MA thesis by Flinders University student Paula Furby.

In the 1995 Queen's Birthday Honours in Australia, she was awarded a Member of the Order of Australia, "For service to art as an artist and teacher".

Hick's work is mentioned multiple times in art historian Bernard Smith's 2001 book on Australian painting.

In 2000, one of her pieces sold for $27,600, a new record for her work.

In 2013 a book covering Hick's life, Catherine Hick: Born Wise_{,} was published.

== Exhibitions ==
Since 1940, Hick's art been presented in both solo and group exhibitions in all states in Australia as well as in the UK, US, and Netherlands.

Her work was included in a 1962 exhibition entitled Commonwealth Art Today at the Commonwealth Institute in London.

A solo exhibition of her work was held at the Royal South Australian Society of Arts gallery, 2–30 March 1994,

== Collections ==
Hick's work is part of the permanent collection of the following art museums in Australia:

- National Gallery of Australia
- National Gallery of Victoria
- Art Gallery of South Australia
- Art Gallery of New South Wales

Her work is also found in the London Guildhall, as well as in the Mertz Collection and the Raymond Burr Collection in the United States.

== Personal life ==
Hicks married Frank Galazowski (d. 1987), and the couple had four children.

She lived in Brisbane, Queensland, from 1978 until 1990.

She died on 11 May 2004 in Adelaide.
