= Museum of the Riverina =

Local history museum in Wagga Wagga, NSW, Australia

Coordinates: 35°7′42.20″S 147°22′4.08″E

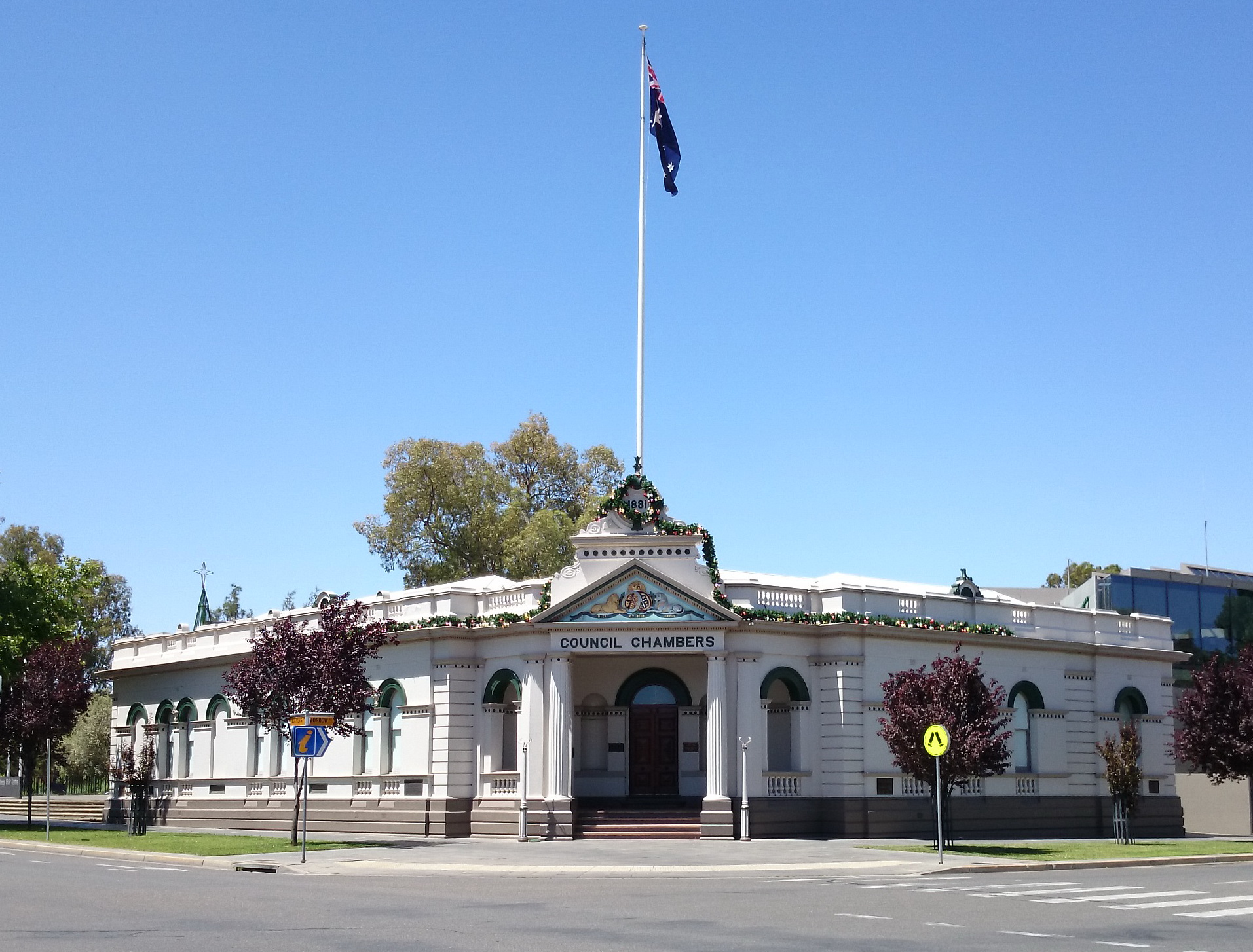
- Established: 1967
- Location: Wagga Wagga, New South Wales
- Website: www.museumriverina.com.au

The Museum of the Riverina is a local history museum in Wagga Wagga, New South Wales, Australia. The Riverina is the region in south-western New South Wales in which Wagga Wagga is located. The museum was established by Wagga Wagga and District Historical Society in 1967 (Morris, p. 241) in premises near the Wagga Wagga Botanic Gardens on Lord Baden Powell Drive.

In the late 1990s, Wagga Wagga City Council took over the operation of the museum, and merged the buildings of the Lord Baden Powell Drive into one. In 1999 the Historic Council Chambers, on the corner of Baylis and Morrow Streets, were converted into a second site for the museum following the opening of the new Wagga Wagga Civic Centre. The Historic Council Chambers site hosts travelling exhibitions while the Botanic Gardens site is home to the Sporting Hall of Fame and the museum's permanent collection, including a set of figurines from the Tichborne case.

The museum provides a regional outreach service to 38 Riverina museums.

== Sporting Hall of Fame ==
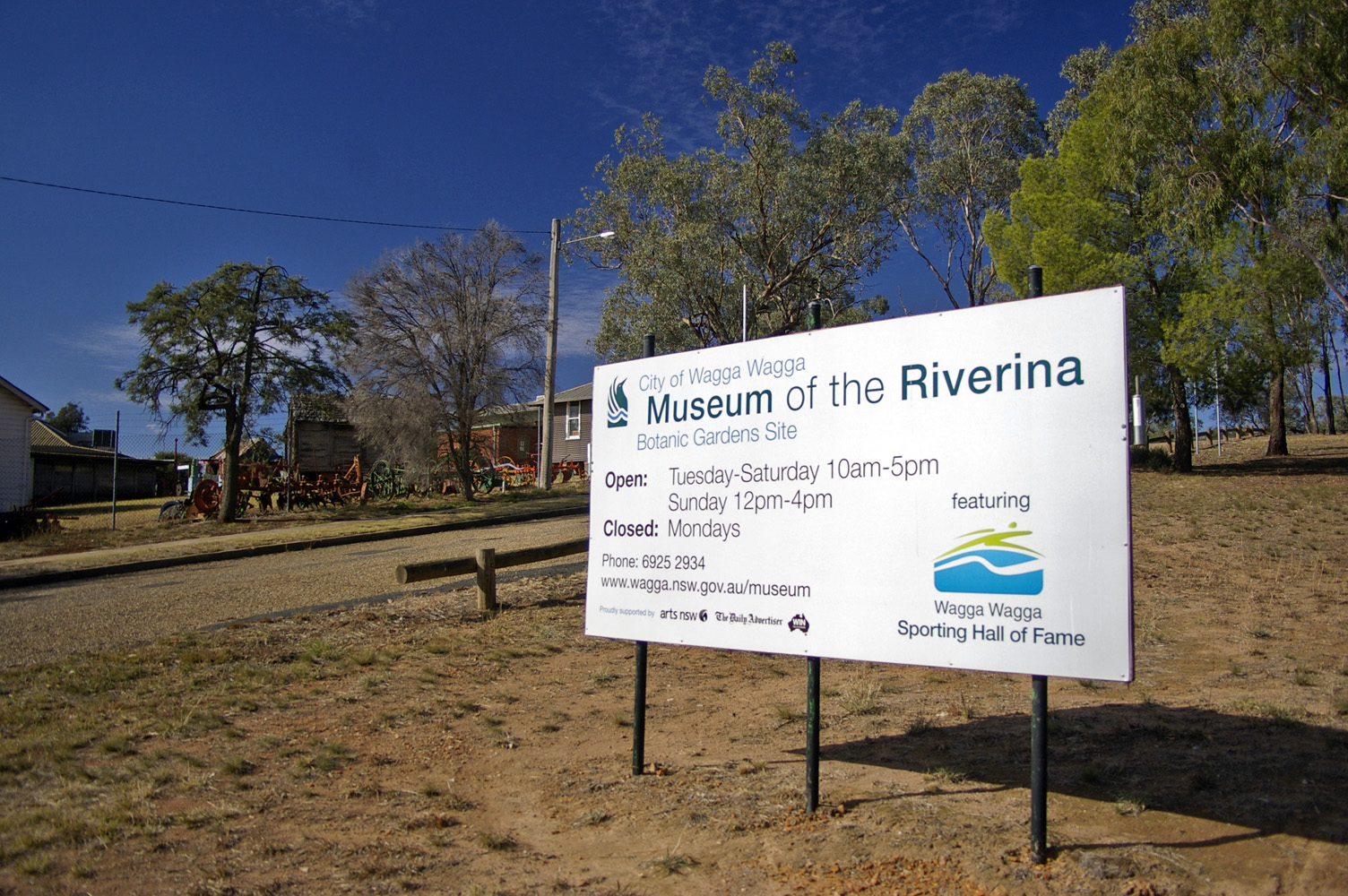
Museum of the Riverina Botanic Gardens site.

The following sportspeople have been inducted into the museum's Sporting Hall of Fame:

- Bain, Phillip - target shooting
- Bajer, Roger - soccer
- Baverstock (née Frauenfelder), Brooke - softball
- Bradley, Melanie - athletics
- Bragg, Thomas - indoor bias bowls
- Breasley, Scobie - jockey
- Brentnall, Greg - rugby league
- Brwn, Cameron Wallace - athletics
- Byrne, Rod - touch football
- Carey, Wayne - Australian rules football
- Carruthers, Simon - squash
- Carter, Megan - hockey
- Chisholm Lachlan - athletics
- Chisholm (née Taylor), Megan - karate
- Collingwood, Josh - cycling
- Commens, Adam - hockey
- Condron, Kevin - motorcycling
- Cooke, Ken - rifle shooting
- Crowe, Graham - shooting
- Daniher, Terry - Australian rules football
- Dawson, Tom - cycling
- Doyle, Tim - kayaking
- Drummond, Cheryl - carriage driving
- Dwyer, Patrick - athletics
- Eisenhauer, Peter - touch football, rugby league
- Elkington, Steve - golf
- Ellwood, Beresford - rugby union
- Finch, Andrew - shooting
- Fletcher, Anthony - rugby league refereeing
- Foster (née Catton), Brenda - tennis
- Gooden (née Wheeler), Amanda - softball
- Haberl (née Campbell), Andrea - table tennis
- Hadkins, Wayne - aero-modelling
- Hann, Quinten - snooker
- Hawick, Greg - rugby league
- Henderson, Kate - diving
- Henderson, Nick - rugby union
- Hetherington, Morris - golf
- Horne (née Robinson), Kim - softball
- Housden, Robert - kayaking
- House, Alyisha - athletics - Junior Sporting Hall of Fame
- Hubbard, Greg - basketball
- Humbert, Ashley - cycling
- Jenkyn, Diane - dressage
- Jones, Allison - orienteering
- Kahlefeldt, Brad - triathlon
- Kelly, Paul - Australian rules football
- Kingston, Geoff - Australian rules football
- Langford, John - rugby union
- Lawson, Geoff - cricket
- Lenehan, James - rugby union
- Longmore, Anna & Rooke, Matthew - dancesport
- Macken, Georgina - orienteering
- Martin, Steve - rugby league
- McDonald, Terry - motorcycling
- McKee, Joyce - lawn bowls
- McKinnon, Bruce - volleyball
- McLay, Peter - cricket
- McLennan, Graeme - hockey and indoor hockey
- McMahon, Terry - touch football
- McMullen, Ken - rugby union
- Miller, Warren - swimming, aquathon and modern pentathlon
- Moffat, Richard - cycling
- Mohr, Wilbur (Bill) - Australian rules football
- Mooney, Cameron - Australian rules football
- Mortimer, Chris - rugby league
- Mortimer, Steve - rugby league
- Murphy, Jacqueline - netball
- Nix, Bernard - touch football
- O'Neill, Andrew - athletics
- Parker, Holly - equestrian
- Paul, Ann - hockey
- Pieper, Gerald - Australian rules football
- Pike, Stephen - referee touch football
- Puckett (née Bennett), Robyn - golf
- Richards, Lloyd - motorcycling
- Richardson, Norma - lawn bowls
- Robertson, Bill - cycling
- Robertson, Bob - cycling
- Roche, Tony - tennis
- Rooke, Barney - shooting
- Rooke, Matthew & Longmore, Anna - dancesport
- Schuster (née Rooke), Maree - clay target shooting
- Scott, Nola - c
- Shipard, Sally - soccer, cricket
- Slater, Michael - cricket
- SMITH, Rex Daniel - touch football
- Sterling, Peter - rugby league
- Stormonth, Michael - dirt track/speedway
- Summons, Arthur - rugby union, rugby league
- Sunderland, Bob - motorcycle racing
- Sutherland, Ben - gymnastics
- Taylor, Col - aero-modelling
- Taylor, Mark - cricket
- Tennant, Raeleigh - triathlon
- Thomas, Gilbert 'Tig' - sailing
- Tonkin, Arthur - rugby union
- Tutty, Bruce - shooting - pistol
- Twitt, Melanie - hockey
- Weissel, Eric - rugby league
- Williams, Garry - sailing
- Williams, Gregory - sailing
- Young, Jason Carl - cricket

== See also ==
- Mobile Cook's Galley
