= Rosemary Crumlin =

Australian art historian, educator and exhibition curator (1932–2026)

Sister Rosemary Crumlin

Personal life
- Born: Rosemary Anne Crumlin; 27 August 1932 Sydney, New South Wales, Australia
- Died: 25 July 2026 (aged 93)
- Other name: Mary St Thomas

Religious life
- Religion: Roman Catholic
- Order: Sisters of Mercy

Rosemary Anne Crumlin RSM OAM (27 August 1932 – 25 July 2026) was an Australian Sister of Mercy, art historian, educator and exhibition curator with a special interest in art and spirituality. She was awarded a Medal of the Order of Australia in the 2001 Queen's Birthday Honours for service to the visual arts, particularly the promotion and understanding of contemporary and religious art, to education, and to the community.

== Biography ==
=== Early life and education ===
Crumlin was born in 1932, to parents Joseph and Rosanna. She had two brothers named Joseph and Christopher.

She completed a Diploma in Painting in 1970 at the National Art School, Sydney. She travelled overseas to study fine art, graduating with a Diploma in Art Education from Birmingham University in 1971 and a Diploma in Religious Education from Corpus Christi College, London in 1972. After returning to Australia, Crumlin graduated with a Master of Arts in Visual Arts from Monash University in Melbourne in 1985. In her final year, she wrote the catalogue for an exhibition held at Monash University Gallery, from 18 April – 23 May 1984.

=== Religious life and career ===
Crumlin entered the Sisters of Mercy when she was 18 years of age. Her religious name was Sister Mary St Thomas.

She was a founding staff member of the Melbourne-based National Pastoral Institute (1973-1988), which had been established by the Australian bishops in 1973 to provide further education to priests, brothers, nuns and lay people after the Second Vatican Council. She was the Director of the Institute from 1983 to 1986. Crumlin was also an academic at the Australian Catholic University and this institution conferred an Honorary Doctorate on her on 25 May 2001 She has also been awarded a Doctor of Sacred Theology (honoris causa) from the Melbourne College of Divinity (now University of Divinity).

Crumlin authored the book Images of religion in Australian Art, which accompanied the exhibition Images of Religion, held from 30 November 1988 to 30 January 1989 at the National Gallery of Victoria. In 1990 Frank Brennan, an Australian Jesuit priest, human rights lawyer and academic, invited Crumlin to bring together an exhibition of religious works by Aboriginal artists. She traveled herself to many remote indigenous communities in search of Aboriginal Christian art and in 1991 the exhibition was held to coincide with the World Council of Churches, which held its Seventh World Congress in Canberra. It opened at the High Court of Australia, under the auspices of the Aboriginal and Islander Commission of the Australian Council of Churches. The collection was also the basis for a book published the same year.

In 1997, Crumlin was the Project Director of the World Without End sculpture exhibition which was held at St Patrick's Cathedral in Melbourne.

She curated the exhibition Beyond Belief: Modern Art and the Religious Imagination which ran from 24 April to 26 July 1998 at the National Gallery of Victoria, an exhibition that was also the basis for another book authored by Crumlin. The exhibition featured a diverse range of twentieth century paintings sourced from public and private collections across the world including the Tate Gallery, Fitzwilliam Museum, Vatican Museum, Folkwang Museum Essen, Staatsgalerie Stuttgart, and the Metropolitan Museum and MOMA in New York.

In 2002, Crumlin launched an exhibition at the Ivan Dougherty Gallery in Paddington, New South Wales. The exhibition of 50 works, O Soul O Spirit O fire, charted the character of the Blake Prize for Religious Art since its inception in 1951.

When the Parliament of the World Religions was held in Melbourne in 2009 Crumlin curated The Spirit Within: Australian Contemporary Art exhibition with Isobel Crombie and Helen Light. She also presented at one of the Parliament's panels on The Torah through paintings and poetry.

In 2011, Crumlin authored The Blake Book which documented sixty years of the Blake Prize. Established in 1951, the Blake Prize is an Australian art prize awarded for religious art. Crumlin's interest in the Blake Prize had started in 1952 when as a young novice she attended the second Blake exhibition.

== Death ==
Crumlin died on 25 July 2026, at the age of 93.

== Publications ==
=== Books ===
- Crumlin, Rosemary. The Blake Book : Art, Religion and Spirituality in Australia : Celebrating 60 Years of the Blake Prize. Edited by Margaret Woodward. Melbourne, Australia: Macmillan, 2011. 9781921394515
- Crumlin, Rosemary, Margaret Woodward, and National Gallery of Victoria. Beyond Belief: Modern Art and the Religious Imagination. Melbourne: National Gallery of Victoria, 1998. 9780724101993
- Crumlin, Rosemary, Margaret Woodward, Catholic Church. Archdiocese of Melbourne (Vic.), and St. Patrick's Cathedral (Melbourne, Vic.). World Without End. Melbourne: Archdiocese of Melbourne, St Patrick's Cathedral, 1997. 9781864201161
- Crumlin, Rosemary, and Anthony Knight. Aboriginal Art and Spirituality. North Blackburn, Vic.: Collins Dove, 1991. 9780859249980
- Crumlin, Rosemary, and Judith Ryan. Images of Religion in Australian Art. Kensington, NSW: Bay Books, 1988. 1862562911
- Crumlin, Rosemary & Monash University. Department of Visual Arts. Exhibition Gallery The Blake prize for religious art : the first 25 years : a survey. Monash University Gallery, Dept. of Visual Arts, Monash University, Clayton, Vic, 1984. 0867464038

=== Book chapters ===
- Crumlin, Rosemary. "Spirit in Story." In Catholic Voices: Best Australian Catholic Writing., edited by Edmund Campion, 135–139. Richmond, Vic.: Aurora Books, 1996. 9781863550536

=== Articles ===
- Crumlin, Rosemary. “Aboriginal Art before It Became an Industry.” Eureka Street 18, no. 2 (1 February 2008): 14–16.
