= Toorak Art Gallery =

Australian art gallery in Melbourne closed 1975

Coordinates: 37.839511°S 144.996228°E

Toorak Art Gallery was an art gallery 277 Toorak Road, South Yarra, Melbourne, Victoria, which specialised in contemporary figurative and abstract Australian art. It was in operation from 1964 to 1975.

== Exhibitions ==
- 1964, from August 9: Bezalel Academy of Arts and Design exhibition of painting and sculpture
- 1964, 7–20 September: Young Australian contemporaries - painting, drawing and graphic art. Artists: Peter Wallace, Tony Cook, Sally Downley, Ken Leveson, John Fischer, Les Kossatz, John Brock, Tor Howlett, Connie Russo, John R. Wratten, John Stokes, Malcolm Ratten.
- 1964: Third exhibition of Lithuanian artists in Australia, Melbourne. Artists: Vida Kabaila, Eva Kubbos, Vladas Meskenas, Nina Meskenas, Irena Pauliukonis, Eva Pocius, Vaclovas Ratas, Henry Salkauskas, Victoras Simankevicius, Algirdas Simkunas, Leonas Urbonas, Adolfas Vaicaitis, Adomis Vingis, Teisutis Zikaras, Leonas Zygas.
- 1965, February: Alex Kosma
- 196? Gerald Bland, John Bursill, Douglas Wright, Janet Body
- 1967, June 28-July 22: Paintings and sculpture: John Adam, George Allen, Norm Affleck, William Aylward, Haslewood Ball,. Graham Chambers, Fred Coventry, Neil Douglas, Karl Duldig, Ludwik Dutkiewicz, Stella Dilger, Kevin English, Gerard Ebeli, William Frater, Patsy Foard, Jemima Fry, Peter Glass, Abigail Heathcote, Esther Harris, Louis James, David Keys, Norman Lindsay, Antoinette Mathieson, Karlis Mednis, Margaret Mezaks, Patrick O'Carrigan, Welsey Penberthy, Bernard Rust, Stephen Spurrier, Douglas Stubbs, Theo Shossau, Alan Sumner, Mario Telese, Wendy Thomas, Lorraine White, Mark Ward, Barbara Wales, Charles Wheeler, Ian Bow, Hermann Hohaus, Robert Langley, Lois Kuppers, Andor Mészáros.
- 1968, March 5–25: Mixed exhibition: Arthur Boyd, Judy Cassab, Neil Douglas, Ludwik Dutkiewicz, Salvador Dali, Donald Friend, Leonard Hessing, Michael Kmit, Rodney Milgate, Keith Nichol, John Olsen, Krishna Reddy, Douglas Stubbs, Roland Wakelin.
- 1968, October: Keith Nichols
- 1969: 28 February-10 March: Moomba Festival exhibition
- 1969, June 10–20: Mixed exhibition
- 4 painters - Antoinette Mathieson, Elizabeth Prior, Joyce Thompson, Barbara Wales
- 1970, 27 February-7 March: Moomba Festival exhibition
- 1970: Frank Hinder
- 1970, April 1–14: Francis Lymburner
- 1970, June 21-July 4: Mid-year exhibition
- 1970, February: Abigail, paintings
- 1970, from 26 November: Exhibition of paintings. Artists: Christine Berkman, Ken Buckland, William Degan, Basil Hadley, Lesley Pockley, David Voigt.
- 1970: Group show incl. Adolfas Jankus
- 1971, from July 27: Paintings & seriographs: Abigail, Henry Bell, Dora Cant, David Voigt, Salvatore Zofrea.
- 1972, from April 28: Frank Auerbach
- 1972, May 21-June 3: Exhibition of paintings by William Aylward, Kevin Lincoln, June Stephenson, Lilian Sutherland, John Winch
- 1972, 11–24 June: Kit Barker, William Broker
- 1972, from September 14: French painters of poetic realism. Artists: Yves Brayer, Christian Caillard, Joseph A. Muslin, Andre Planson, Maurice-Georges Poncelet, Roland Oudot, George Rohner.
- 1972, July 2–15: July mixed exhibition: John Aland, David Armfield, Jamie Barker, Ken Buckland, Elizabeth Cummings, Lyndon Dadswell, Phillip Davis, Ross Davis, Shay Docking, Neil Douglas, William Frater, Robert Grieve, George Hodgkins, Julie Ingleby, Louis James, Michael Kmit, Eva Kubbos, Keith Nichol, Geoff O'Loughlin, Aina Nicmanis, Desiderius Orban, William Peascod, L. Pendlebury, Clifton Pugh, Henry Salkauskas, David Voigt, John Winch, Salvatore Zofrea, Reinis Zusters.
- 1972, 15–28 October: Salvatore Zofrea solo show
- 1973, September 3–18: Liverpool +1 Jan Windus, Tony Kirkman, Noel Sheridan, John Fisher, Tim Burns, Mitch Johnson
- 1973, October: Lynch Prize for Painting
- 1974, April: Barrie Goddard
- 1974: Kevin Connor, solo
- 1975, November 26–28: Artists for Labor and democracy - an exhibition of paintings, sculpture, drawings and prints
- 1975: Barry Cleavin and Geofrey Brown, prints
- 1975: Paul Greenaway
- 1975: Stephen May
