= Dwight Yates =

American writer

Dwight Yates (1942 - November 12, 2023) was an American writer and former lecturer at the University of California, Riverside. His fiction has appeared in numerous literary journals, including Northwest Review, Zyzzyva, Western Humanities Review, Quarterly West, and Sonora Review.

Born in Helena, Montana, Yates served as a Peace Corps Volunteer in Tanzania (1964–66), as a secondary school master and medical practitioner, and later as a soldier in the U.S. military. While studying in Arizona he met his wife, Nancy Carrick. He lectured on creative writing at the University of California, Riverside for 13 years retiring in 2002.

Yates was a Pushcart Prize Special Mention in 1992 and was awarded the National Endowment for the Arts (NEA) Fellowship in Fiction in 1993.

His first collection of short stories, Haywire Hearts and Slide Trombones, won the Serena McDonald Kennedy Fiction Award from Snake Nation Press in 2005, while his second collection of short fiction, Bring Everybody, won the inaugural Juniper Prize for Fiction from the University of Massachusetts Press.

In 2007, Yates was awarded his second NEA fellowship while he continued work on a long-deferred novel.
