= S. H. Ervin =

Woolbroker and donor (1881–1977)

S. H. (Samuel Henry) Ervin (21 January 1881 – 29 October 1977) was a wool broker, collector and philanthropist, born in Monkland, Queensland. He was commonly known as Harry and was the youngest son of Samuel Ervin and Matilda. After his father's death in the same year, his mother remarried, and during his youth, Harry adopted his stepfather's surname, Rohde.

The Rohde family relocated to Mosman, a suburb of Sydney, where Ervin Rohde attended Sydney Church of England Grammar School (Shore).

After leaving school, Ervin worked in woollen mills in Europe before returning to Australia. During World War I, Ervin assumed control of Lothringer & Co., a company associated with his brother-in-law Karl Lothringer. In 1927, he founded S. H. Ervin Limited, a wool brokerage firm.

During World War II, Ervin worked as a wool appraiser, contributing to the war effort. His firm experienced growth during the post-war wool boom.

== Philanthropy ==
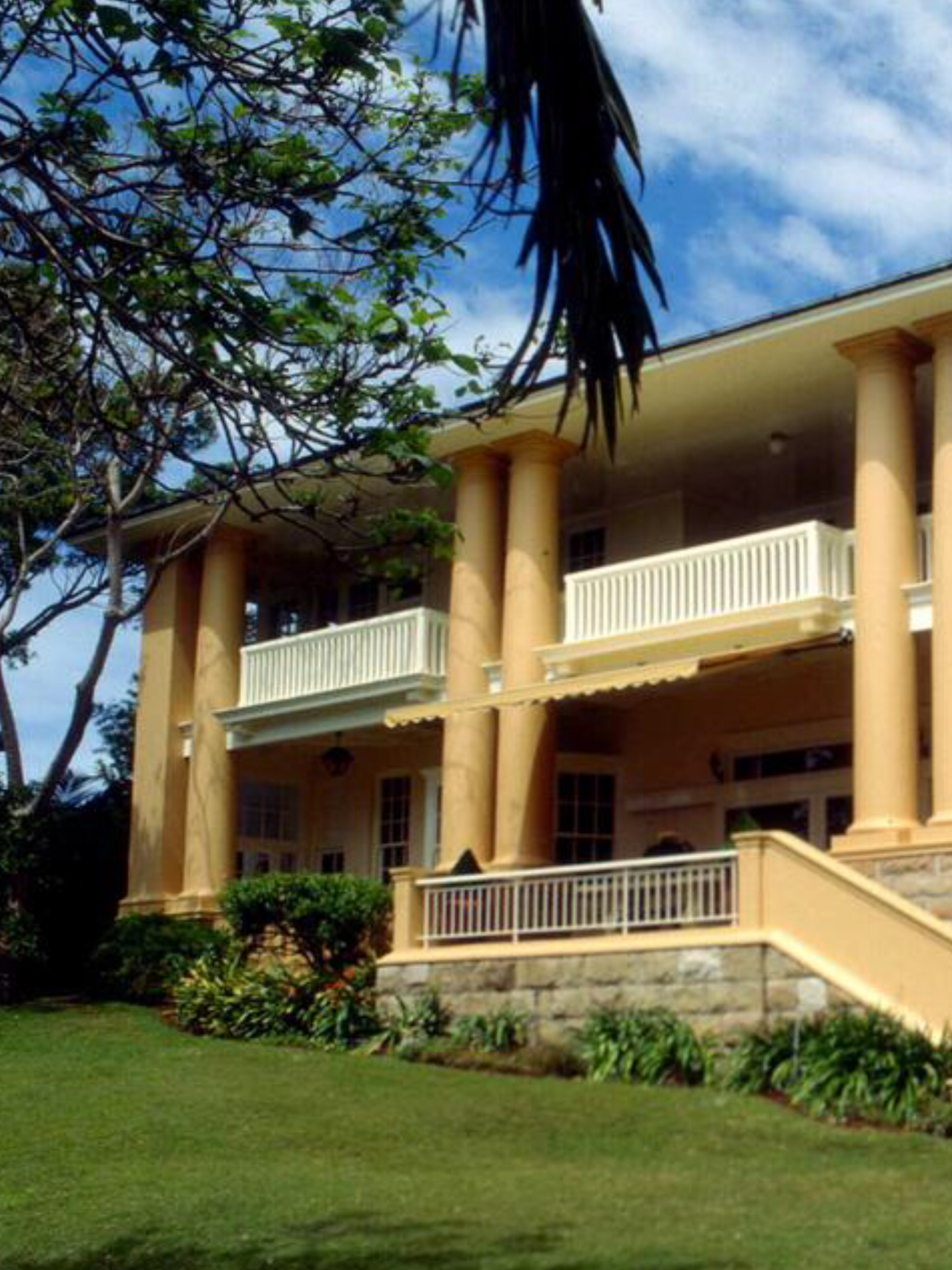
Glanworth was the Ervin family home in Darling Point

Ervin purchased artworks by artists such as Norman Lindsay, Tom Roberts, and Arthur Streeton due to his connection with artists at Sirius Cove.

In the 1960s, Ervin became a significant donor. In 1962, he donated his collection of paintings to the Australian government and advocated for the establishment of a national art gallery. In 1971, he donated $50,000 to the New South Wales branch of the National Trust of Australia to acquire Norman Lindsay's home in Faulconbridge, New South Wales. In 1974, he donated $200,000 to renovate two buildings at Observatory Hill, Sydney, transforming them into an art gallery and museum. The buildings were named the S. H. Ervin Gallery.

Ervin Place in Conder, Canberra, is named after him.

== Personal life ==
On 7 April 1926, Ervin married Muriel Beatrice Gray, who had two daughters from a previous marriage. They resided at Glanworth, Darling Point, and later at The Astor on Macquarie Street in Sydney.

Ervin outlived his wife and stepdaughters and died on 29 October 1977.

== See also ==
- S. H. Ervin Gallery
