= David Voigt =

Australian artist (born 1944)

David John Voigt
- Born: 1944 (age 81–82); Sydney, Australia
- Education: National Art School
- Known for: Painting, Printmaking
- Notable work: Amsterdam series (1971-1972), Blue Requiem (1976), Meditation (1981), Hills of Ravensdale (1981), Lord Howe Island series (1984)
- Awards: English-Speaking Union Travelling Scholarship (1968), Blake Prize (1976, 1981), Wynne Prize (1981)

David John Voigt (born 1944) is an Australian artist, who won the Blake Prize in 1976 and 1981 and the Wynne Prize in 1981.

== Art ==
Voight graduated from the National Art School, Sydney in 1968. The following year he won the English-Speaking Union Travelling Scholarship, living in Paris with the assistance of the Power Bequest from the University of Sydney and Amsterdam.

In 1972 Voight returned to Australia. He has had solo exhibitions in every major Australian city, including at the Toorak Art Gallery in Melbourne and Coventry Gallery in Sydney.

He won the Blake Prize for Religious Art in 1976 with his painting "Blue Requiem", and again in 1981 for "Meditation". The Bulletin magazine gave the work a bad review suggesting the sponsor was embarrassed to give it the $2500 prize money:

As a body closely concerned with economics, and thus inflation, the bank must have been nervous about letting on that it was encouraging art at the rate of $25 a brush-stroke.

That same year he won the Wynne Prize for Australian landscape from the Art Gallery of NSW for "Hills of Ravensdale". He was a finalist in the Wynne Prize on three other occasions.

He is included in the collections of the National Gallery of Australia, the Art Gallery of NSW and the Wollongong Art Gallery
