= Ludwik Dutkiewicz =

Ukrainian-born Australian artist (1921–2008)

- Born: 2 February 1921; Stara Sil, Ukraine (then a part of Poland)
- Died: 30 April 2008 (aged 87)
- Occupation: Artist
- Known for: Winning the 1953 and 1954 Cornell Prize

Ludwik Dutkiewicz (2 February 1921 – 2008) was an Australian artist born in Poland. He was born in Stara Sil, Ukraine (then a part of Poland) on 2 February 1921. He won the 1953 and 1954 Cornell Prize.

== Career ==
Dutkiewicz was appointed as botanical illustrator to the Adelaide Botanic Gardens in 1953. He illustrated numerous botanical books including as a contributing illustrator to Flora of Australia.

== Collections ==
Dutkiewicz's works are held in the collections of the Art Gallery of South Australia (Green Village, Classic abstract, Life drawing of seated nude, Time in Summer (film still), and Portrait of David Dallwitz.); the Australian Centre for the Moving Image (Transfiguration); the Newcastle Art Gallery (Recluse); the State Library of South Australia (Portrait of a ballerina 'Natasha'); the Heide Museum of Modern Art (Landscape with Arches); the National Film and Sound Archive (Reflections (short film), 1962, Director; Time In Summer (feature film), 1968, Director; and Transfiguration (short film), 1964, Producer.); Flinders University Museum of Art (Untitled, line drawing, and Untitled, oil painting.); and the South Australian Society of Arts (Didgeridoo).

== Exhibitions ==
His work has been exhibited at the Ukrainian Institute of Modern Art (Australian Artists from Ukraine, group), Flinders University Museum of Art (Ludwik Dutkiewicz: the Dangerfield collection), the Royal SA Society of Arts Gallery (Untitled, 1951, group; Adelaide 1952 Group, 1952, group; and Untitled, 1954, solo), and the Toorak Art Gallery (From Boyd to Wakelin, 1968, group).

== Awards ==
He won the Cornell Prize in 1953 (Boats after Storm), and 1954 (Green Village).
