= Willans Hill Miniature Railway =

Rideable miniature railway in New South Wales, Australia

Coordinates: 35.1309°S 147.3672°E

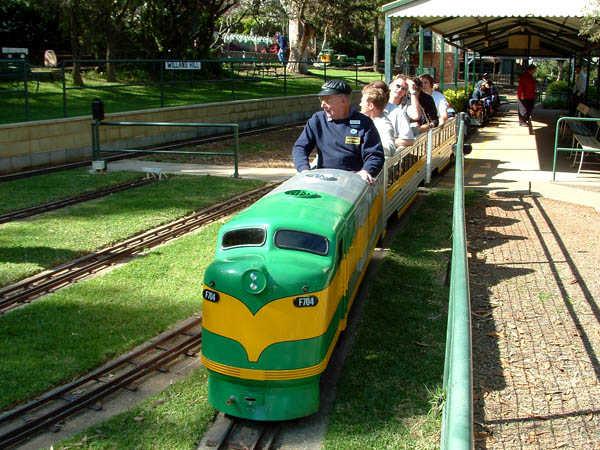
Locomotive leaving the main station

Willans Hill Miniature Railway
1 Wagga Wagga Botanic Gardens
2 Miniature railway
3 Henry's Tunnel

Willans Hill Miniature Railway is a rideable miniature railway located in Wagga Wagga Botanic Gardens in the suburb of Turvey Park in Wagga Wagga, New South Wales, Australia.

The railway was established in 1978 by Raymond Catts, who advertised for interested persons to form a club for the display and use of models. It took from 1978 until 1980 to get the numbers to start a Technical Education course in workshop practice which was in fitting and machining, from this course the numbers grew and land was found to establish what is to-day. It is operated by the Wagga Wagga Society of Model Engineers. It includes 3 km (1.9 mi) of a combined 7 1/4 inches (180 mm) and 5 inches (130 mm) track, two stations, two tunnels, three bridges, four buildings, 6 locomotives owned by the club and a number of personally owned locomotives.

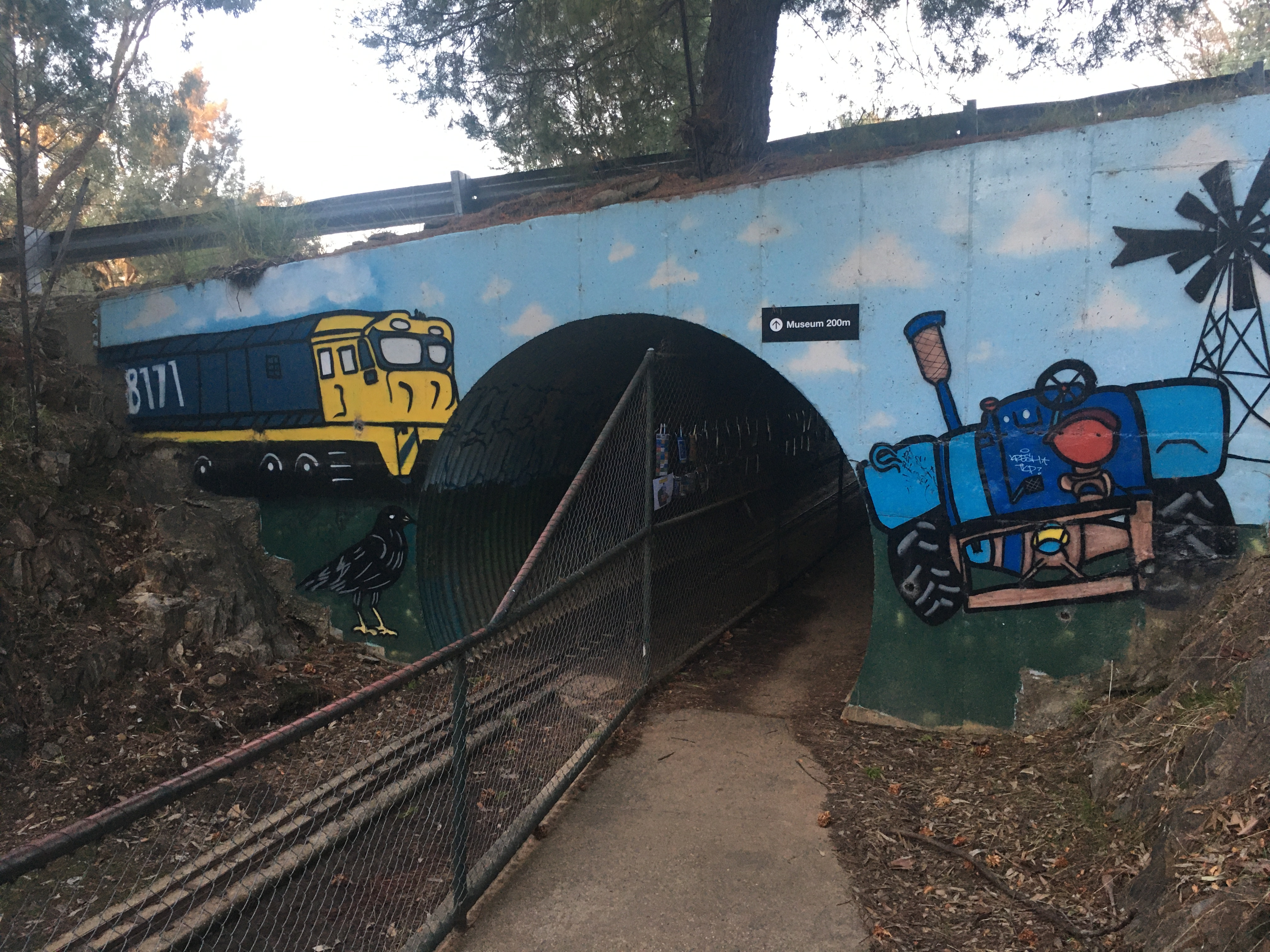
Henry's Tunnel

An annual Invitational Run has been held every year since 1988 on the first weekend of November. Miniature trains from all over Australia converged here for two days of train running. Traditionally, the Saturday is for club members only and the Sunday event is open for public running.

The first 24-hour run, called Railway for Life, was held 15–16 September 2007 in aid of the Cancer Council.

There are currently three routes in use.

- The main line which is a shorter route that runs within the boundaries of the botanical gardens itself.
- The museum line which takes the trains under Lord Baden Powell Drive over to the loop next to Museum of the Riverina car park.
- The spiral line which runs around a spiral and then returns via either the museum line or the main line. This principle is embodied in the Bethungra Spiral between Wagga Wagga and Cootamundra on the Main Southern line.

The latest addition to the club is the locomotive T387 which was purchased from Adelaide for $28,000. This locomotive had its maiden run on the tracks in October 2018.
