= Cornell Prize =

Former art prize in South Australia

The Cornell Prize, officially F. Cornell Art Prize, was a major contemporary art prize offered in South Australia from 1951 until 1965.

== History ==
The inaugural prize was presented at an exhibition by the Contemporary Art Society of South Australia from 1951 to 1965. In that year, the judges were R. G. Campbell, Kym Bonython, Max Harris, Joseph Choate, and Dorrit Black.

The prize was administered by the Cornell family. Several of the prize-winning paintings were subsequently acquired by the Art Gallery of South Australia.

== Winners ==
Winners include:

- Wladyslaw Dutkiewicz (Summertime, 1951 and Orient, 1955)
- Douglas Roberts (Connoisseurs, 1952)
- Ludwik Dutkiewicz (Boats after Storm, 1953 and Green Village, 1954)
- Francis Roy Thompson (Design with Coloured people, 1956) (Note: Thompson's work was exhibited at the New Gallery of Fine Art in Rundle Street in 1953, where Voitre Marek was director.)
- Stanislaw Ostoja-Kotkowski (Form in Landscape, 1957 and Buildings, 1959)
- Jacqueline Hick (Lost tribe, 1958 and Corridor, 1960)
- Barbara Hanrahan (1961)
- Udo Sellbach (1962)
- Geoff Wilson (1963)
- Franz Kempf (1964)
- Lynn Collins (1965)
