= Stencil Art Prize =

The Stencil Art Prize is an international competition for stencil art that is based in Australia.

Founded in 2009, he prize was formerly known as the Australian Stencil Art Prize. In 2013, it was expanded to include international stencil artists.

An exhibition of finalists and the winning artwork is held in Sydney each year, with the winning stencil artwork acquired by the Stencil Art Prize. Entrants must submit an image of a completed stencil painting to be eligible to enter. The winner receives a cash prize.

Previous winners:

- 2009 Australian Stencil Art Prize - Miss Link
- 2010 Australian Stencil Art Prize - E.L.K
- 2011 Australian Stencil Art Prize - 23rd Key
- 2012 Australian Stencil Art Prize - Ralf Kempken
- 2013 Stencil Art Prize - David Soukup, Ralf Kempken

== See also ==
- Luke Cornish
- Stencil definition
