= Eveline Kotai =

Australian artist (born 1950)

- Born: 1950 (age 75–76); Perth, Western Australia, Australia
- Education: Curtin University
- Occupation: Artist
- Website: evelinekotai.com

Eveline Kotai (born 1950) is an Australian artist. Kotai is known for her idiosyncratic stitched collages, which involves the artist cutting up her paintings into thin strips and reconfiguring them across a surface with the use of a sewing machine and invisible thread.

== Biography ==
Born in 1950 in Perth Western Australia, she began her tertiary art studies in 1975-79 studying drawing and sculpture at Curtin University & TAFE. She currently resides in Fremantle, Western Australia.

In 2016, with collaborators Margaret Dillon and Penny Bovell, she created a public artwork for the Western Australia Museum Research Centre.

== Collections ==
- Art Gallery of Western Australia
- City of Fremantle Art Collection
- Cruthers Collection of Women's Art, the University of Western Australia.
- City of Wanneroo, Australia

== Awards ==
- The 2018 Cossack Art Award “Horizontal Shift”
- The 2012 Blake Prize (co-winner) “Writing on Air – Mantra”
