= Stara Sil =

Rural locality in Lviv Oblast, Ukraine

Stara Sil Стара Сіль
- Rural settlement
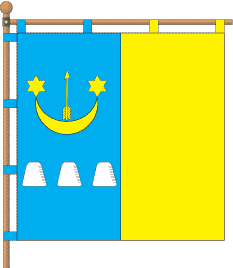
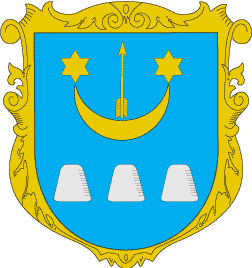
- Flag Coat of arms

- Location within Lviv Oblast
- Coordinates: 49°29′22″N 22°57′56″E
- Country: Ukraine
- Oblast: Lviv Oblast
- Raion: Sambir Raion
- Hromada: Staryi Sambir urban hromada
- Established: 1421

Area
  - Total: 193 km^{2} (75 sq mi)
- Elevation /(average value of): 346 m (1,135 ft)

Population (2022)
  - Total: 1,074
  - Density: 5.56/km^{2} (14.4/sq mi)
- Time zone: UTC+2 (EET)
  - Summer (DST): UTC+3 (EEST)
- Postal code: 82066
- Area code: +380 3238
- Website: смт Стара Сіль ^{(Ukrainian)}

Stara Sil (Ukrainian: Стара Сіль, lit. 'Old Salt'; Polish: Stara Sól; German: Salzbrock), formerly known as Stara Ropa (Ukrainian: Стара Ропа, lit. 'Old Brine') is a rural settlement in Sambir Raion, Lviv Oblast, of Western Ukraine. It belongs to Staryi Sambir urban hromada, one of the hromadas of Ukraine. Population: 1,074 (2022 estimate).

== Geography ==
The settlement is located in the Ukrainian Carpathians hills in the western part of the Lviv region. This is on the path Staryi Sambir – Khyriv at a distance of 7 kilometres (4.3 mi) from the administrative center Staryi Sambir and 96 kilometres (60 mi) from the regional center of Lviv.

== History and attractions ==
The first historical mention is traditionally considered the year 1254. However, according to some sources, the settlement was founded as an outpost in the 9–10 century. Since ancient times in the territory settlement were the extraction of salt, hence the name of the settlement.

Stara Sil was granted the Magdeburg Law in 1421.

Until 18 July 2020, Stara Sil belonged to Staryi Sambir Raion. The raion was abolished in July 2020 as part of the administrative reform of Ukraine, which reduced the number of raions of Lviv Oblast to seven. The area of Staryi Sambir Raion was merged into Sambir Raion.

Until 26 January 2024, Stara Sil was designated urban-type settlement. On this day, a new law entered into force which abolished this status, and Stara Sil became a rural settlement.

Stara Sil contains a number of listed architectural monuments of Sambir Raion:

- Church of the Resurrection of Christ (wooden), 17th century
- The bell tower of the church of the Resurrection of Christ (wooden), 17th century
- Church of St. Michael (stone), 1613–1660, 1922–1928
- The bell tower of the church of St. Michael (mix.), 17th century
- Church of Saint Paraskevi (wooden), 16th–17th centuries
- The bell tower of the church of St. Paraskevi, 17th century

== Notable people ==
Ludwik Dutkiewicz (1921–2008), an artist, was born in Stara Sil.

== Gallery ==
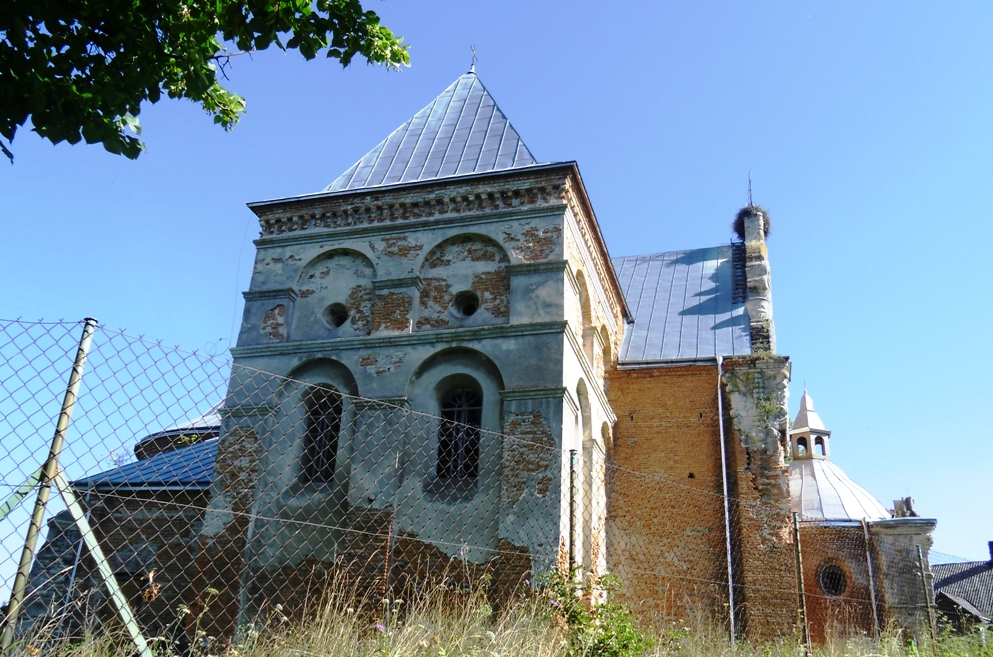
St. Archangel Michael catholic church

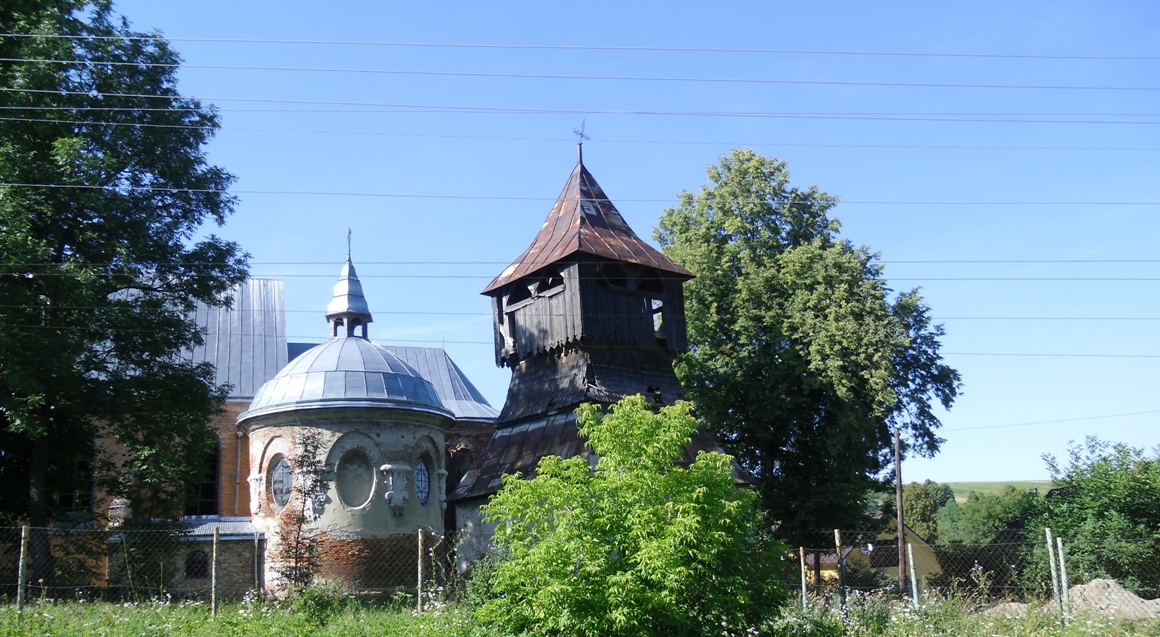
Church and bell tower of the St. Archangel Michael catholic church

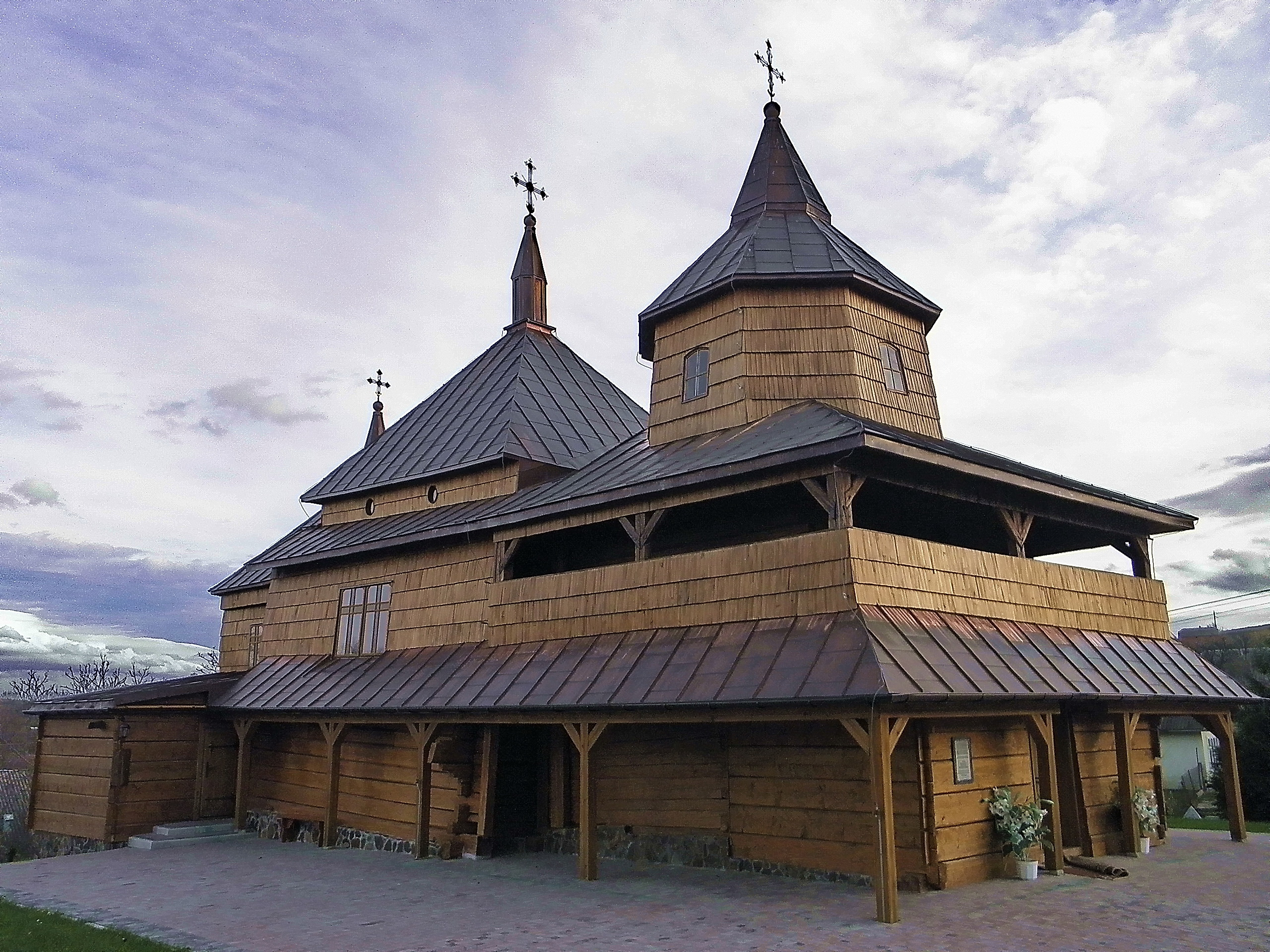
Church of St. Paraskevi

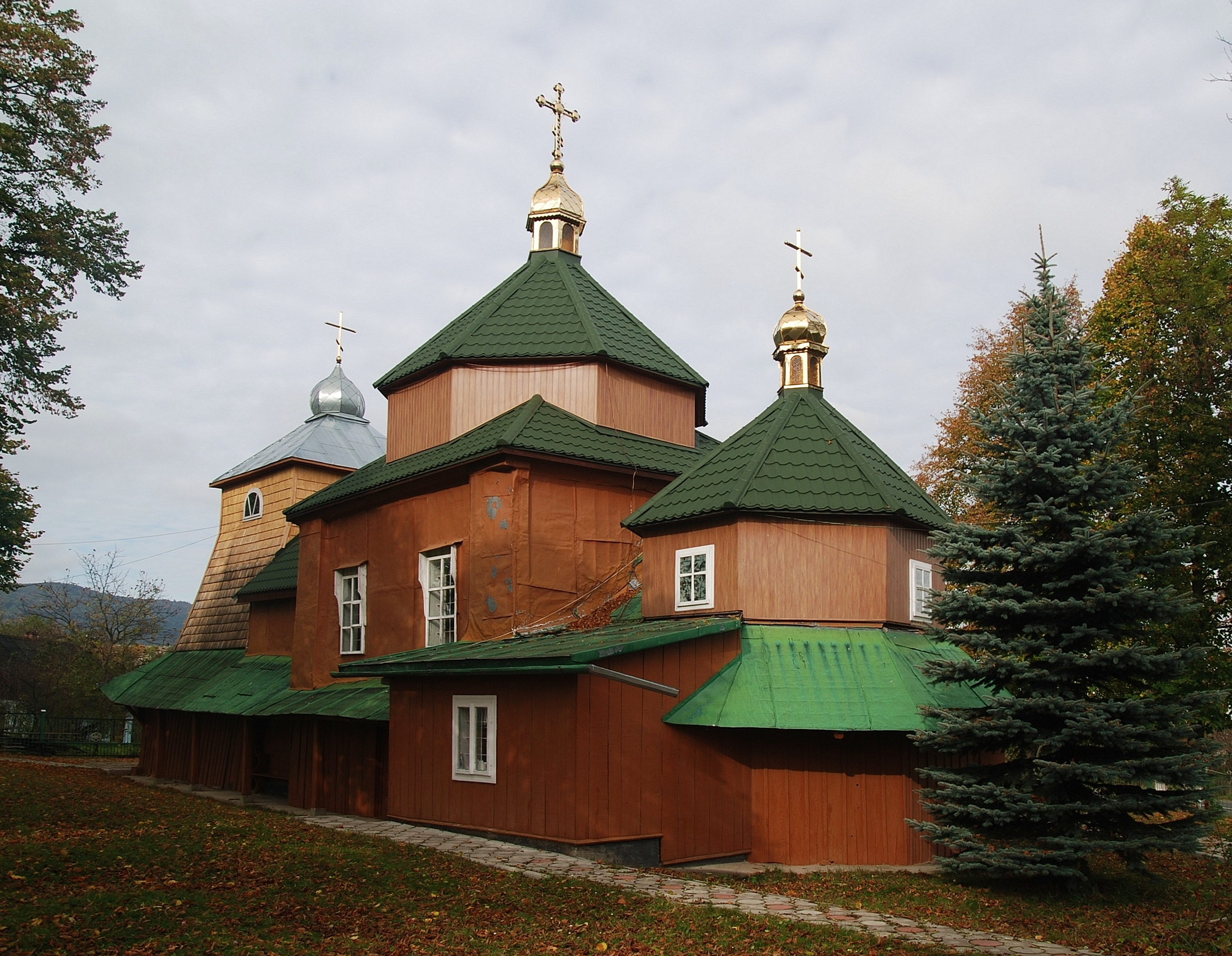
Church of the Resurrection

== Literature ==
- Історія міст і сіл УРСР : Львівська область, Населені пункти, центри селищних і сільських Рад, Старосамбірського району, Стара Сіль. – К. : ГРУРЕ, 1968 р. Page 785 (in Ukrainian)
