= Salon des Refusés (Archibald) =

Australian art exhibition

Salon des Refusés is a popular Australian art exhibition showing some of the rejected submissions to the Archibald Prize, Australia's most prestigious art prize for portraiture, and also the Wynne Prize entries for landscape and figure sculpture. The inaugural exhibition took place in 1992, and a People's Choice Award has been given since 1999.

== History ==
The Salon des Refusés exhibition was initiated in 1992 by the S.H. Ervin Gallery in Sydney, in response to the large number of works entered into the Archibald Prize not selected for hanging in the official exhibition. Its name comes from a similar event that started in Paris in 1863, also called Salon des Refusés (French for "Salon of the Rejected").

In 2021, the David Roche Foundation in Melbourne Street, North Adelaide hosted an exhibition Salon des Refusés works, the first time the exhibition had been on display in Adelaide.

== Description ==
Each year, after the judging for the Archibald Prize is done, selectors from the S.H. Ervin Gallery choose a selection of works that are representative of the works submitted for the Archibald Prize, but not accepted for consideration. The selected works are exhibited in the Salon des Refusés. The Salon des Refusés often is the first opportunity that many artists have of broader public attention. The criteria for selection are quality, diversity, experimentation, and wit.

== People's Choice Award ==
The Holding Redlich People's Choice Award commenced in 1999. The award is sponsored by the Sydney-based law firm Holding Redlich. The winner is selected by votes from visitors to the Salon des Refusés.

Past winners of the People's Choice Award include:

- 1999 Zhou Xiaoping Jimmy Pike & Zhou Xiaoping
- 2000 Evert Ploeg Richard Roxburgh
- 2001 Guy Maestri Silent Assembly
- 2002 David Naseby Richard Hall
- 2003 Jiawei Shen Edmund Capon
- 2004 Juan Ford Allan & Goliath (Allan Fels)
- 2005 Margaret Woodward The hobby-horse rider (Self portrait)
- 2006 Gillian Dunlop Portrait of John Gaden
- 2007 Jiawei Shen Tri-selves (Self portrait)
- 2008 Peter Smeeth Philip Adams – The Rematch
- 2009 Zhong Chen Charles Blackman
- 2010 Ann Cape Kevin in his studio (Portrait of Kevin Connor)
- 2011 Robert Hannaford Portrait of Trevor Jamieson
- 2012 Barbara Tyson Ita
- 2013 Christopher McVinish Portrait of Colin Friels
- 2014 Nick Stathopoulos Ugly (Portrait of author Robert Hoge)
- 2015 Paul Trefry Homeless still human (Sculpture of a homeless man)
- 2016 Tianli Zu The senator and Ma (Portrait of Senator Penny Wong)
- 2017 Luke Cornish Ben (portrait of artist Ben Quilty)
- 2018 Sally Ryan Portrait of the Artist's Son (Ben Ryan, Artist)
- 2019 Kerry McInnis, Drawn in steel (Harrie Fasher, sculptor)
- 2020 Joshua Yeldham, Phantom limb – Smith’s creek
- 2021 Tania Wursig
- 2022 Mary Tonkin
- 2023 Joshua Yeldham, Driftwood
- 2024 Noel Thurgate, Portrait of Ann Thomson
