= Snake Nation Press =

Book publishing company in Ray City, Georgia, USA

- Founded: 1989
- Founder: Roberta George; Jean Arambula
- Headquarters location: Georgia, USA
- Official website: snakenationpress.org

Snake Nation Press is an independent publishing company based in Valdosta, Georgia, United States. The press awards two major literary prizes: the Violet Reed Haas Poetry Award and the Serena McDonald Kennedy Fiction Award.

Among the prominent writers discovered by the press are Brian Bedard, Starkey Flythe, Seaborn Jones, Morris Smith and Dwight Yates. Its fiction collections are frequent nominees for The Story Prize. Two poetry winners have also gone on to win Georgia Library Association Honors. The press has also published award-winning volumes of local history.

Snake Nation Press is the largest independent publisher in Georgia and among the largest in the South it was founded in 1989 by Roberta George, the former director of the Lowndes/Valdosta Arts Commission, and Jean Arambula.
