= Contemporary Art Centre of South Australia =

Art museum and space in Parkside, Adelaide, Australia

Coordinates: 34.9423°S 138.6096°E

The Contemporary Art Centre of South Australia (CACSA)
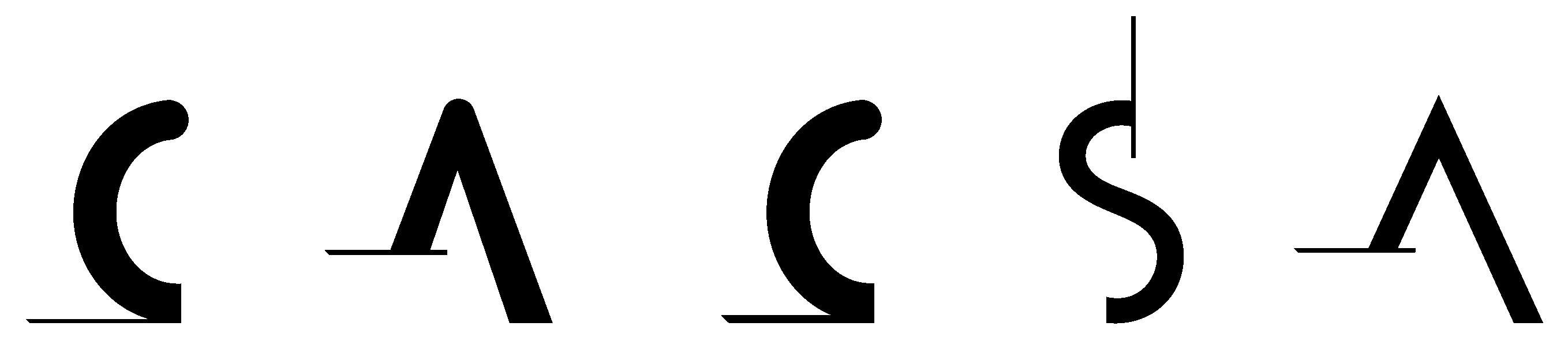
- Former name: Contemporary Art Society (CAS); Contemporary Art Society of South Australia
- Established: 1942
- Dissolved: 2016
- Location: 14 Porter Street, Parkside, South Australia
- CEO: Liz Nowell (2017)
- Website: Archived website (January 2017)

The Contemporary Art Centre of South Australia (CACSA), formerly Contemporary Art Society (SA Inc.) (CAS), also known as Contemporary Art Society of South Australia, was an art museum and art space located in the Adelaide suburb of Parkside, in South Australia. In late 2016 it merged with the Australian Experimental Art Foundation to form ACE Open.

The quarterly art journal Broadsheet was published by the CAS from 1954. This became Broadsheet: A Journal of Contemporary Art when the organisation changed its name and constitution in 1986, and later changed again to Contemporary Visual Arts and Culture: Broadsheet and, from 2007, Contemporary Visual Art + Culture: Broadsheet. ACE Open continued to publish the journal until September 2017.

== History ==
A network of independent organisations across Australia each known as Contemporary Art Society was created following the founding of the Contemporary Art Society of Victoria in July 1938.

Contemporary Art Society (SA Inc.) (also referred to as the Contemporary Art Society of South Australia) was the third of these, established in 1942 as a breakaway from the Royal South Australian Society of Arts. Located at 14 Porter Street, Parkside, CAS was run by volunteers, with founder Max Harris as president and secretary. Ivor Francis was a founding member, becoming chairman in 1944. Dorrit Black was an active member of the society until her death in 1951. Harris had brought the idea of the society from Melbourne, run by John Reed. According to an oral history interview with former art teacher Victor Adolfsson, one of the founding members of CAS (when still a student at the time), members retained their membership of the Royal Society of the Arts, which had become "reactionary". Other early members included a solicitor called Donnithorne, and David Dallwitz.

An "all Australian anti-Fascist" art exhibition was held at the Society of Arts gallery in Adelaide by the older branches of the CAS (Victoria and New South Wales) in December 1942, including work by artists from around Australia. Ivor Francis, whose works were included in the exhibition, The News reported that three of the works exhibited in the exhibition, two of which were landscapes by SA artists Jacqueline Hick and Marjorie Gwynne, along with a satirical painting by Victorian artist John Bainbridge, were acquired by the South Australian National Gallery (now AGSA).

The first exhibition held by the CAS Adelaide branch under Max Harris was held in the Society of Arts gallery in October 1943, and included around 200 works from Melbourne and Sydney.

In 1960, the Contemporary Art Society of South Australia held an exhibition of Contemporary Australian Art as part of the Adelaide Festival of Arts, with assistance from George Berger from Sydney, in Charles Birks department store in Rundle Street. A catalogue of the exhibition was published.

In 1964 the Contemporary Art Society moved into a bluestone residence in Porter Street, Parkside, which was used for exhibiting its members' work, which, by the time of its closure in 2016, had become the longest-running contemporary art space in the country.

In 1974, a new organisation named the Australian Experimental Art Foundation (AEAF) was created by members breaking away from CACSA, with the intention of focusing on "more radical, multi-disciplinary and performance work".

In 1986 the organisation became incorporated, was renamed the Contemporary Art Centre of South Australia, and became a publicly-funded organisation which ran nationally and internationally significant exhibitions. It was one of Australia's most prominent contemporary art organisations, with its mission to "promote, develop and support contemporary art practice and critical thinking through South Australian, national and international exhibitions, publications, debate and associated activities". CACSA was a member of Contemporary Art Organisations of Australia (CAOs) (now apparently defunct).

From August 2016 CACSA started talks to merge with the Australian Experimental Art Foundation (AEAF) after two rounds of severe funding cuts to the Australia Council in the federal government budgets of 2014/15 and 2015/16. Arts SA provided funding for the two organisations to cover operational costs for 2017, which enabled planning for the merger, which was named ACE Open. Liz Nowell, former CEO of CACSA, became CEO of the new organisation.

== Publications ==
The CAS published the quarterly art journal known as Broadsheet from 1954. This was continued by CACSA from 1986, variously titled Broadsheet: A Journal of Contemporary Art, Broadsheet: Contemporary Visual Arts and Culture; Contemporary Visual Arts and Culture: Broadsheet, and, from 2007, Contemporary Visual Art + Culture Broadsheet (abbreviated to CVA+C Broadsheet).

== Cornell Prize ==
The inaugural F. Cornell Art Prize was awarded at an CAS exhibition in July 1951.

== Exhibitions ==
CACSA undertook regular large scale survey and multi-sited surveys of contemporary South Australian art as part of the CACSA Contemporary series, including CACSA Contemporary 2010: The New New, CACSA Contemporary 2012: New SA Art + Ibidem: Public Art Project and CACSA Contemporary 2015. CASCA also provided a space to predominantly emerging and experimental arts practice as part of the Project Space exhibition program.
