= S. H. Ervin Gallery =

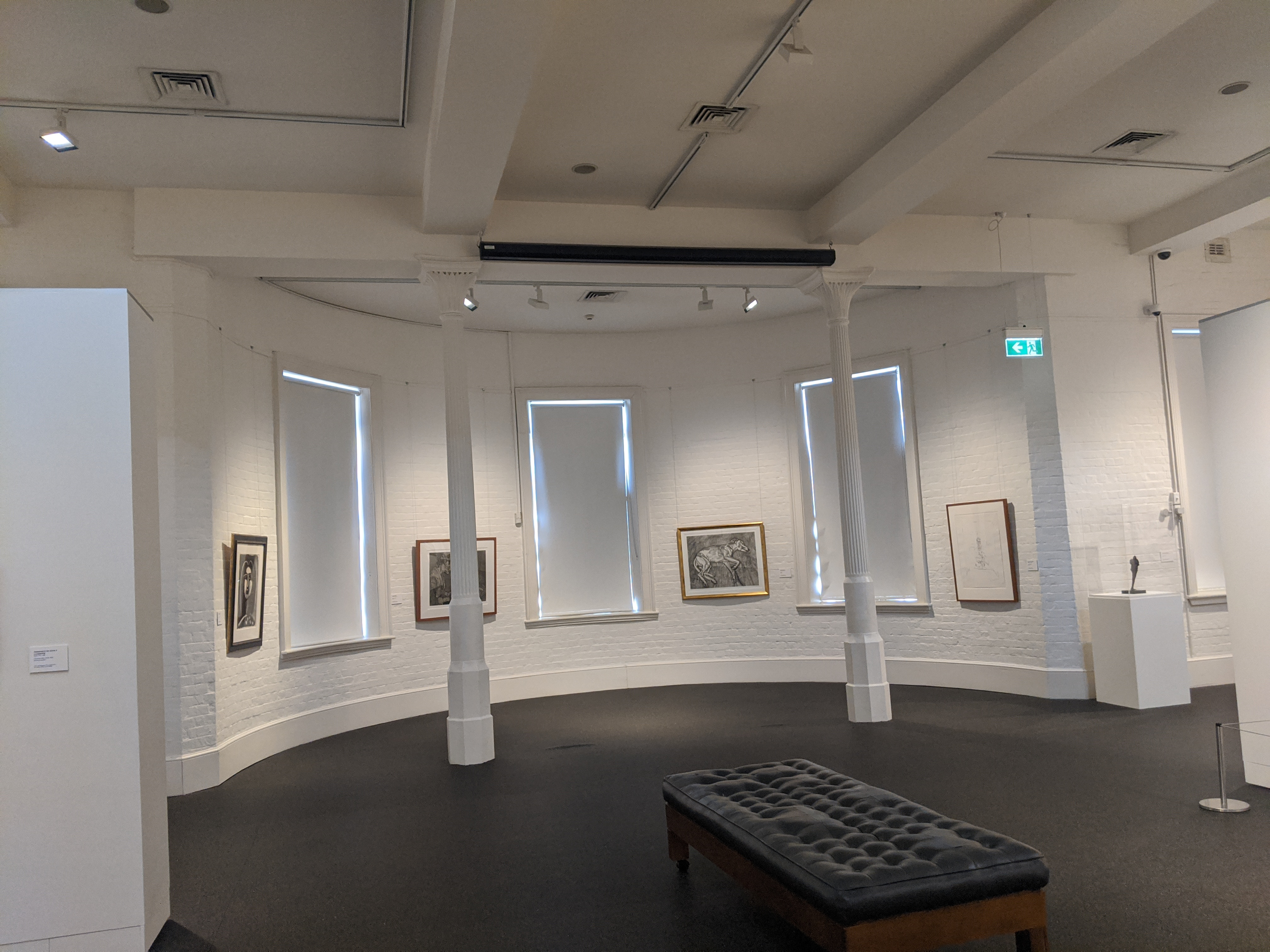
- Interior view of S. H. Ervin art gallery, Sydney, NSW

- Location within inner Sydney
- Established: 1978; 48 years ago
- Location: Watson Road, Observatory Hill, The Rocks, Sydney, New South Wales, Australia
- Coordinates: 33°51′41″S 151°12′08″E
- Type: Fine arts, visual arts, Asian arts
- Public transit access: Wynyard railway station, Sydney
- Website: shervingallery.com.au

The S. H. Ervin Gallery is a major public art institution housed in the historic National Trust Centre in Observatory Park, Sydney. "The gallery's exhibition programme is designed to explore the richness and diversity of Australian art, both historical and contemporary, and present it in new contexts." The gallery also encourages research and promotes the practice of appraising the work of Australian artists. It is named after Samuel Henry Ervin.

== History ==
The gallery building, designed by Henry Robertson, was constructed in 1856. It provided classrooms for the Fort Street School. In 1916 the school became Fort Street Girls' School. The history of public education in Australia began when the Governor of New South Wales Charles FitzRoy established a Board of National Education on 8 January 1848 to implement a national system of education throughout the Colony. The board decided to create two model schools, one for boys and one for girls. The site of Fort Street Model School was chosen as the old Military Hospital at Fort Phillip, on Sydney's Observatory Hill. The site is now the home for the S. H. Ervin Gallery. The co-educational Fort Street High School is now located in Petersham, New South Wales.

In the early 1970s S H Ervin, philanthropist and collector, offered a bequest for the establishment of a public art gallery for the display of Australian art. The National Trust of Australia secured a lease of the then Fort Street Girls' School building from the New South Wales Department of Public works. The buildings were restored and the gallery opened May 1978, with an exhibition by Conrad Martens.

== Gallery activities ==
The gallery has presented of many artists, including, Clarice Beckett, Albert Tucker (artist), Violet Teague, Kathleen O'Connor (painter), Margo Lewers, Jean Bellette, William Robinson (painter), John Coburn (painter), Cressida Campbell, Nicholas Harding, Euan Macleod and Wendy Sharpe. In early 2020 the exhibition "Margaret's Gift" acknowledged and celebrated the legacy of artist Margaret Olley.

The gallery is the venue for the Salon des Refusés, for portraits rejected by the Archibald Prize and also for those rejected by the Portia Geach Memorial Award, a celebration of female Australian artists. Since 2018 it has administered the Evelyn Chapman Art Award.
