= Wagga Wagga Botanic Gardens =

Botanical gardens in Wagga Wagga, Australia

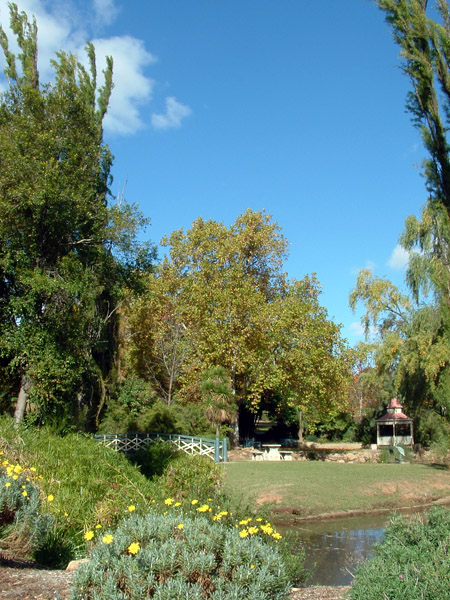
- Wagga Wagga Botanic Gardens
- Interactive map of Wagga Wagga Botanic Gardens
- Type: Botanical
- Location: Wagga Wagga, New South Wales
- Coordinates: 35°7′51.20″S 147°21′56.16″E
- Area: 8.9 hectares (22 acres)
- Opened: 1969
- Owner: Wagga Wagga City Council
- Operator: Friends of Wagga Wagga Botanic Gardens

Wagga Wagga Botanic Gardens, Australia are located in the Wagga Wagga suburb of Turvey Park on a 20-hectare (49-acre) site on the south western slopes of Willans Hill Reserve. Access to the gardens is via Macleay Street near the corner of Lord Baden Powell Drive. There is a camellia garden, a tree chapel, Island and Bamboo Garden, native flora section, Shakespearean garden and cactus and succulent garden. As well as many different types of garden, the Botanic Gardens are home to a music bowl, a small zoo with a walk-through aviary, and Willans Hill Miniature Railway.

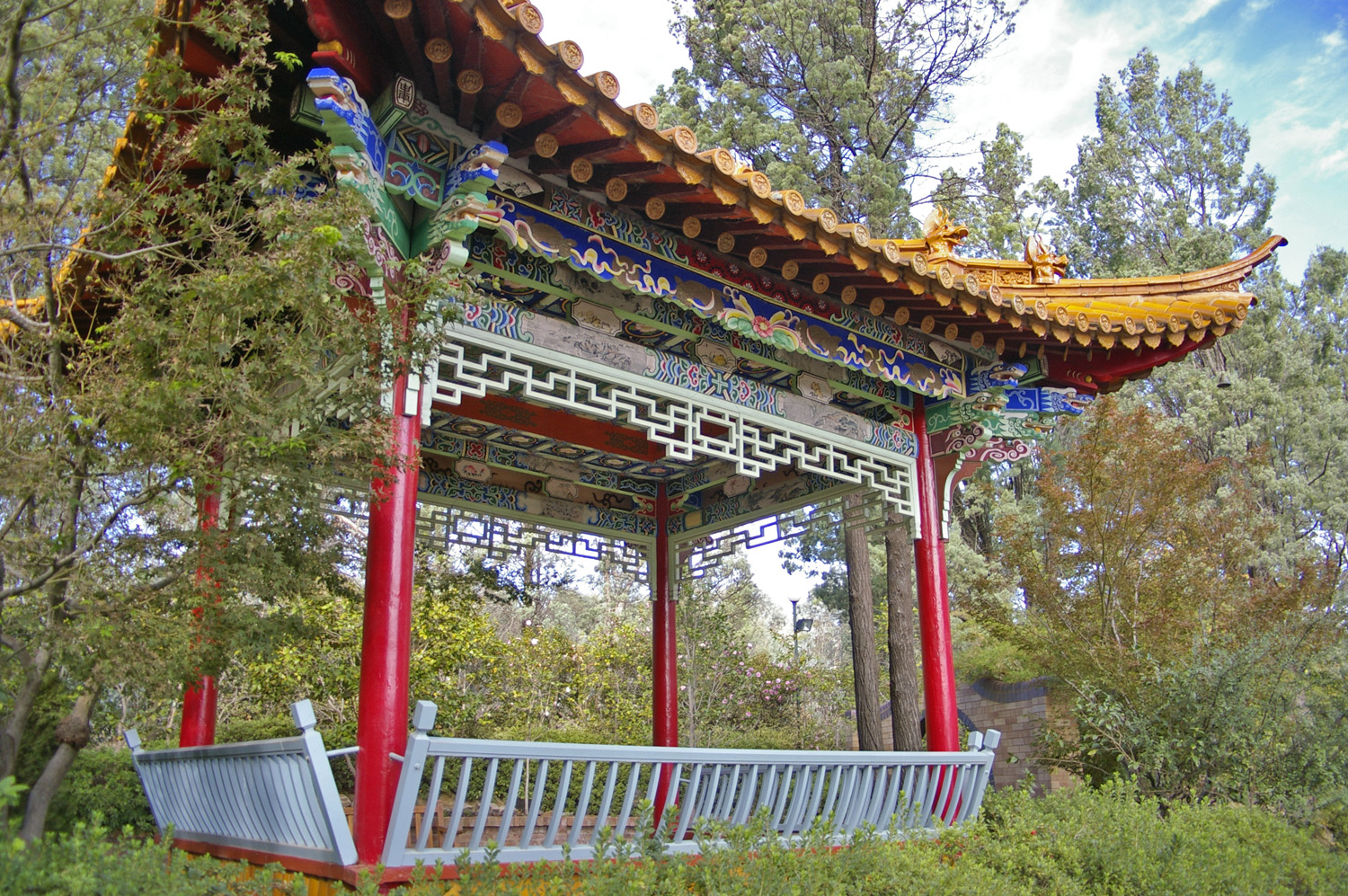
Chinese Pavilion

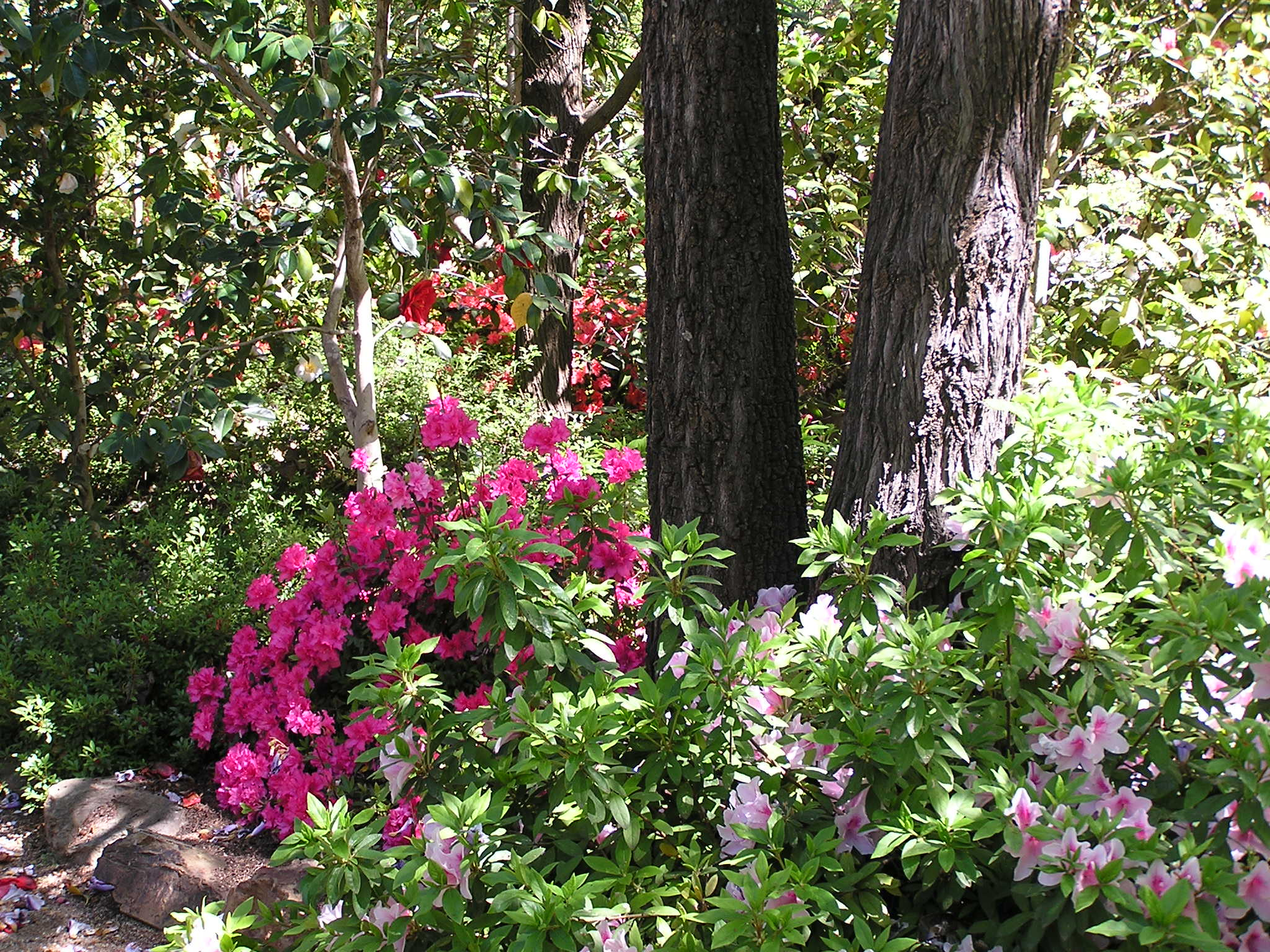
Azaleas in the camellia garden

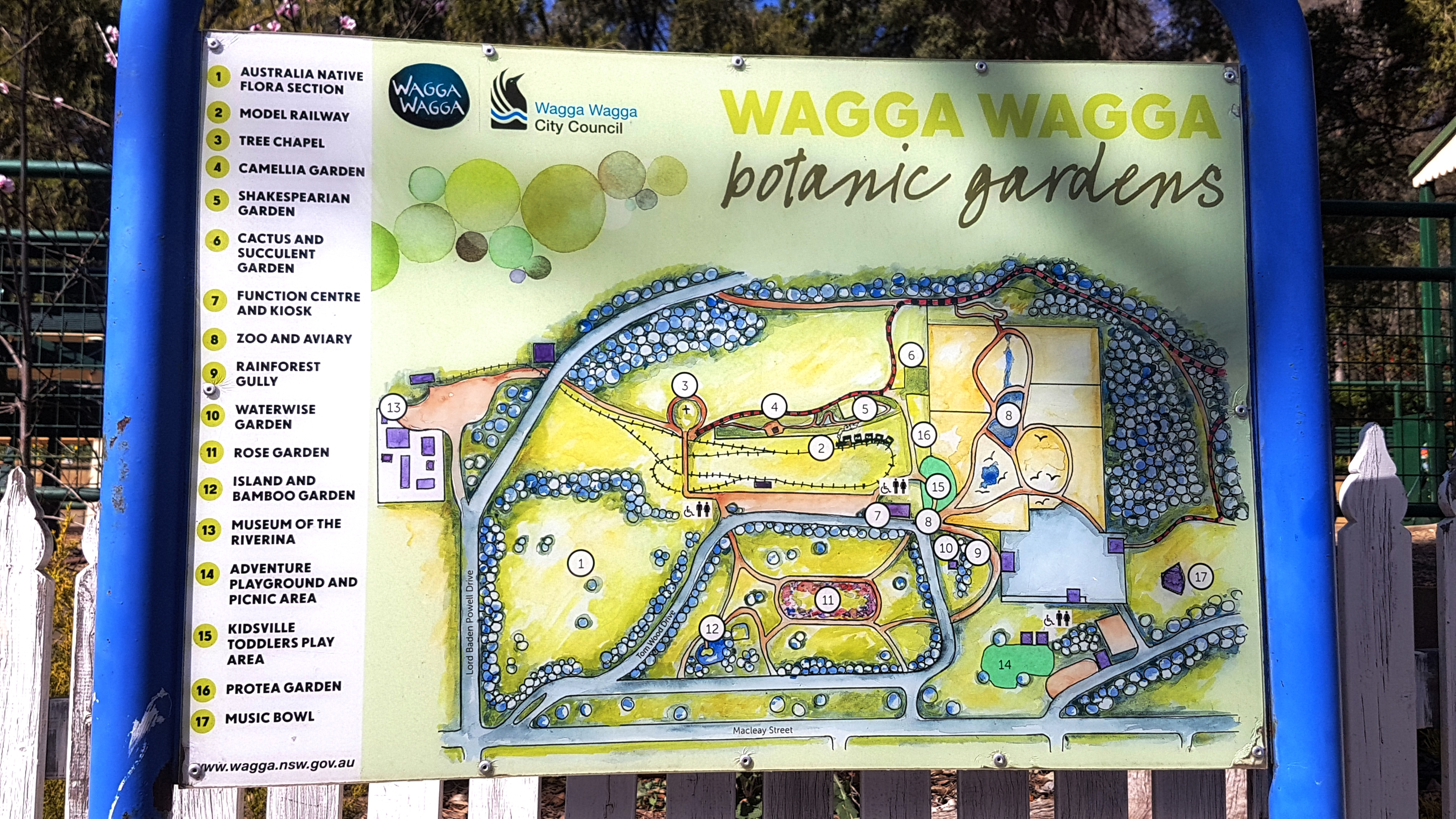
Gardens layout

Preliminary planning of the garden began in 1961. The gardens were established in 1969 and occupied 8.9 hectares.

The camellia garden was established as a bicentennial project in 1988, along with several other northernly situated themed garden projects including the Cacti and Succulent Garden, an Elizabethan themed garden funded by the Shakespearian Society of Wagga Wagga and the Tree Chapel, a fully functional outdoor church that is a popular venue for weddings. Located in the camelia garden is a magnificently decorated traditional Chinese pavilion, a bicentennial gift from Kunming, China, one of Wagga Wagga's sister cities.

The Museum of the Riverina is situated next to the Botanic Gardens on Lord Baden Powell Drive
