= Savanhdary Vongpoothorn =

Laotian-born Australian artist

Savanhdary Vongpoothorn (born 1971) is a Laotian-born Australian visual artist. She immigrated with her parents as a seven-year old, and through studies and travel has integrated Laotian, Vietnamese and Australian influences in her art. Her art reflects cross-cultural influences in contemporary Australia as she fuses her personal experiences, dual cultures, and painterly abstraction. She has exhibited widely in Australia and Singapore, and her works are held in major state and regional galleries across Australia. She was a finalist in the Sir John Sulman Prize 2016 and the Moet & Chandon art prize in 1998. She lives and works in Canberra.

== Early life and education ==
Savanhdary Vongpoothorn was born in Champasak, Laos, in 1971 and came to Australia as a seven year-old in 1978. In 1970 her anti-communist father was about to be sent to a re-education camp and escaped to Thailand. Her mother then took the children and crossed the Mekong River into Thailand with a people smuggler. After nine months in a Thai refugee camp, an Australian aunt sponsored them to emigrate to Australia. Her work today evokes her Buddhist background.

Vongpoothorn is a devout Buddhist. She grew up in a community that practiced Tehravada Buddhism that is prevalent in South and Southeast Asia. Lessons from her upbringing can sometimes be reflected in the titles of her works.

At school she only excelled in English and Art. She was accepted at the Nepean College of the Arts, University of Western Sydney based on her portfolio, not her HSC results. At Nepean she was encouraged to "play" and to view her cultural heritage in new ways. She began to focus on her textile heritage. She was first noticed for her student work shown in the NSW Travelling Art Scholarship exhibition in 1992.

She graduated with a visual arts degree from the University of Western Sydney in 1992, and then earned a masters in visual arts from the College of Fine Art (part of the University Of New South Wales) in 1993.

During her last year of art school she moved to the studio-home of painter Roy Jackson who was part of the Wedderburn artistic community near Campbelltown south of Sydney and adjacent to a national park. Vongpoothorn fell in love with the bushland. She often visited Wedderburn in Western Sydney where she later lived for eight years, learning about the Australian Bush and participating in the Wedderburn artistic community. This was also the first time she lived outside her family environment, and found herself with full-time artists. She collected items from the bushland and integrated them into floor-based art works.

She only returned to Laos for the first time in after art school and has returned often to Laos and the communities along the Mekong River. She admits her visits influence her works.

She is married to anthropologist Ashley Carruthers and has two children, Khanisorn and Latsamy Carruthers. In 2004 she moved to Canberra, Australia. Today she and her family spend time in Vietnam every year in the town of Hoi An and Savanhdary acknowledges the influence of Vietnam in her art.

== Works ==
In the years after art school, her work integrated elements from Australian landscape and symbols from Laotian textiles. Her early works (1992 - 1994) were three-dimensional floor works. But by the mid-1990s, Vongpoothorn was creating textured works on paper and canvas.

Time and motherhood helped her feel anchored in Australia and as the artist has said in interview:

"Feeling at home in Australia is an anchor, it allows me the freedom to go back to the place of my birth in my mother’s village in Champasak and research for my current work. I guess the reason why the Australian landscape is not present in my current work is because I am home."

Her paintings are said to evoke the chanting and music of Laos, and the Laotian community in Australia, which her father, a Buddhist monk, serves. Her work also reflects traditional crafts of Laos and Vietnam:

"When you are living outside your place of origin you tend to feel more intense about the need to have and to acquire knowledge about your place of origin. I don’t want my parents to die not knowing who is going to continue with our tradition; I will be the one to continue with our culture and religious tradition."

Her residencies in various countries influenced her experimental approach to art. In Vietnam she learned to weave with Bamboo. She came back from India with a series of delicate works on paper that echo the colours of traditional subcontinental painting. In Japan she pursued a project with poet Noriko Tanaka. She created a 2019 work (Footsteps to the Nigatsu-do) that consists of rubbings made from the sacred patterns found on the steps of the Nigatsu-do temple at Nara, embellished with Tanaka’s calligraphy and her own loose characters.

Overall patterns in her work recall the mandalas used for meditation in Buddhism, and also show an affinity with Southeast Asian textiles. She has also incorporated language, including Pali Script and Vietnamese braille. Savanhdary often pierces the canvas with small holes (or has her father drill them for her). In some work the viewer can see through the work. In others she has pushed paint through the holes to create surface pattern. These works evoke weaving. Such delicate detail cannot be reproduced in photos; the works must be seen.

Her work is represented by Martin Browne Contemporary in Sydney.

== Exhibitions ==
According to Martin Browne Contemporary, she has had the following solo exhibitions:

- 2016 Ramayana on the Mekong, Martin Browne Contemporary, Sydney
- 2014 All is Burning, Martin Browne Contemporary, Sydney
- 2013 The Beautiful as Force, Martin Browne Contemporary, Sydney
- 2011 Stone down a Well, Niagara Galleries, Melbourne
- 2008 Re-enchantment, Martin Browne Fine Art, Sydney
- 2005 Incantation, Martin Browne Fine Art at The Yellow House, Sydney
- 2004 A Certain Distance, Niagara Galleries, Melbourne
- 2003 Martin Browne Fine Art at The Yellow House, Sydney
- 2002 bindi dot tartan zen, Niagara Galleries, Melbourne
- 2000 Niagara Galleries, Melbourne
- 2000 King Street Gallery, Sydney
- 1998 King Street Gallery, Sydney
- 1998 Holy Threads – Lao Tradition and Inspiration, Campbelltown City Art Gallery, Sydney (exhibited with Lao textiles from 19th & 20th century)
- 1997 Tradition and Interpretation, King Street Gallery, Sydney

Mutual Art lists the following exhibitions:

- 2020 GG | ABHK 2020, Gajah Gallery, Singapore
- 2020 Broken Sutra, Niagara Galleries, Melbourne
- 2019 Shaping Geographies: Art. Woman. Southeast Asia, Gajah Gallery, Singapore
- 2019 All that arises, Drill Hall Gallery, ANU
- 2019 Abstract 19, King Street Gallery, Sydney

together with nine other exhibitions.

== Collections ==
She has works in the collections of:

- The National Gallery of Australia (Moonlight 1, 2001)
- The National Gallery of Victoria (Of water and of clouds I-VIII)
- The Art Gallery of New South Wales (Lifting words, 2011)
- QAGOMA (together with Mungsamai Vongpoothorn, polymer paint on perforated canvas)

She is also said to have works in the collections of the Campbelltown Arts Centre, the Wollongong University art collection, the University of Western Sydney art collection, and the Cruthers collection in the Lawrence Wilson Art Gallery (but is not listed in the Cruthers 2018 list of artworks and artists).
