= Elisabeth Cummings =

Australian artist (born 1934)

- Born: 1934
- Awards: Portia Geach Memorial Award (1972); Medal of the Order of Australia (2011)

Elisabeth Cummings (born 1934, Brisbane) is an Australian artist known for her large abstract paintings and printmaking. She has won numerous awards including Fleurieu Art Prize, The Portia Geach Portrait Prize, The Mosman Art Prize, and The Tattersalls Art Prize. Her work is owned in permanent collections across Australia including Artbank, The Queensland Art Gallery, The Gold Coast City Art Gallery and the Art Gallery of New South Wales. She is notable for receiving recognition later in her career, considered by the Australian Art Collector as one of the 50 most collectible Australian Artists.

== Early life ==
Elisabeth Cummings was born on 3 June 1934 in Brisbane, Queensland. During the Second World War Cumming’s family evacuated Brisbane and lived in the country before returning to live in Alderley. The family home in Alderley was surrounded by bushlands. The Cummings family owned a holiday home at Currumbin on the Gold Coast where Cummings, as a child, would paint watercolour landscapes. Currumbin and the Australian bush are now regular subjects in her landscape paintings. Cummings and her brother, Malcolm, would draw still lifes constructed by their mother, who was a primary school teacher, until her father said "let the kids draw what they want.” Cummings’ father, Robert Cummings, was an architect, a Professor of Architecture at the University of Queensland, an art collector and trustee of the Queensland Art Gallery. Cummings would regularly attend paint workshops run by Australian Artist Vida Lahey at the Queensland Art Gallery.

== Education ==
During her youth, the Cummings home was visited frequently by artists including Donald Friend, and Len and Kathleen Shillam. Cummings initially wanted to pursue architectural training but decided to enroll in art school after meeting and painting with Margaret Cilento. She studied at the National Art School, then known as East Sydney Technical College, from 1953 to 1957 where she was educated by artists Douglas Dundas, Wallace Thornton, Dorothy Thornhill, Godfrey Miller and Ralph Balson. At art school, Cummings was exposed to the work of fellow young Australian artists which she found to be formative to her practice. The artists Cummings cites as influential during this period include Grace Cossington Smith, Margaret Preston, Fred Williams, Russell Drysdale, Sydney Nolan, John Olsen and Jimmy Rose.

In 1958, Cummings received the NSW Traveling Art Scholarship and in 1960 the Dyason Bequest, both of which facilitated her travel through Europe for the next decade. In 1961 she studied at Kokoschka’s School of Vision run by Oskar Kokoschka in Salzburg, Austria before travelling to Florence, Italy. She spent the next 10 years living and studying between Italy and Paris. In Florence she shared a villa with other artists, where she met her husband, fellow painting student Jamie Barker. Cumming’s work was informed by European and Australian predecessors such as Pierre Bonnard, Henri Matisse, Paul Cézanne, Pablo Picasso, Édouard Vuillard and Margaret Olley. In 1968, she returned to Australia and settled in Sydney. In 1969 she started teaching at East Sydney Technical College on a part-time basis.

== Work ==
Elisabeth Cummings is a multi-disciplinary artist and celebrated colourist painter, working within painting, printmaking, drawing and ceramics. Inspired by the Australian bush, and a sense of place and memory, which are themes in Cumming’s semi-abstract landscapes, interiors and still life paintings. Cumming’s starts her paintings by drawing multiple quick sketches of the scene which form the basis for her final full-sized work. John McDonald describes her painting style as "[t]hick, heavily worked, painterly surfaces with complex marks and intense colour". Notable paintings from Cummings body of work include interiors, Journey Through The Studio painted in 2004 and Inside The Yellow Room, 2005. Her landscape paintings include Arkaroola landscape, 2005, which was rejected from the Wynne Prize, Edge of the Simpson Desert, 2011 and Wynne Prize finalist Monaro Shadow and Light, 2015.

=== Early work ===
Elisabeth Cummings worked part-time as an art teacher from 1969 to 2001 at multiple art colleges including the City Art Institute, Sydney (1975 to 1987) and the National Art School of Sydney. She continued painting independently during this time, winning awards such as the 1974 Grafton Prize and the 1977 Landscape and Still Life Prizes, RAS. Elisabeth Cummings has lived and worked at her Wedderburn studio residence since 1976.

=== Later work ===
Elisabeth Cummings has been called ‘The Invisible Woman of Australian Art’ as she worked quietly and independently in her studio for 43 years with limited recognition. Cummings was unaffected by the lack of coverage of her work, stating "I like anonymity." She held her first Retrospective Exhibition "Elisabeth Cummings 65-96" at age 62 in Campbelltown Art Gallery, New South Wales. In 2012 Cummings exhibited her second Retrospective ‘Luminous: Survey Exhibition Landscapes of Elizabeth Cummings’ at the SH Ervin, Observatory Hill, Sydney. Now, Elisabeth Cumming’s works are a part of many major and regional Australian public collections including the National Gallery of Australia; the Art Gallery of New South Wales; The Queensland Art Gallery and Campbelltown Arts Centre, Sydney. In 2011 Elisabeth Cummings, at age 77, was awarded the Order of Australia Medal in recognition for her services to the visual arts in Australia. In 2018 Cummings was the subject of Noel Thurgate’s portrait Elisabeth Cummings in her studio at Wedderburn, 1974 and 2018, which was a finalist for the 2018 Archibald Portraiture Prize.

Cummings is a frequent traveller and has participated in international and national artist residencies and exhibitions. In 2014, at age 81, participated in an artist residency and exhibition at The Nock Art Foundation in Hong Kong. In the same year Cummings, in a group of nine Australian artists, held a group exhibition at the Waiheke Arts Centre during their residency in Waiheke, New Zealand. Cummings was involved in the travelling exhibition YOUR FRIEND THE ENEMY along with fifteen Australian and New Zealand Artists. The artists were invited to Gallipoli, Turkey to paint the shores of Anzac Cove.

=== Printmaking ===
In 2001 Cummings expanded into printmaking, specifically etching. She became involved in printmaking through a workshop with Michael Kempson at Cicada Press, a studio associated with UNSW Art & Design in Sydney. Cummings participated in a program whereby artists print with the assistance of students. Other notable participants include Reg Mombassa and Euan Macleod. Cummings has since visited Cicada Press weekly to work with Kempson. Her print work explores similar concerns to her painting, primarily landscape and interiors. Cummings also created monoprints through Whaling Road Studios. The Cruthers Collection of Women's Art at the University of Western Australia hold three lithographs, Studio, 1986, Dappled bush, 1995 and Windy bush, 1995, and a silkscreen print Billabong, 1999 by Cummings. In 2017 Cummings donated a comprehensive archival collection of 85 of her prints and etchings to the New England Regional Art Museum.

=== Ceramics ===
Cummings has also explored ceramics and sculpture in the form of small-scale interior sets with figures crafted in clay. These were created together with Lino Alvarez. Cummings has also made small scale figurative sculptures out of bronze. In 2012 she collaborated with Louise Boscacci to make translucent porcelain plates and platters on which Cummings painted. The flat shape of the plates was chosen to reflect the salt encrusted clay pans of northern Queensland. The project "Cicada Waterfall" was named for the cicadas that can be heard in the bush at Cummings Wedderburn home. These pieces were exhibited in 2014 at King Street Gallery in Sydney as part of Cummings exhibition Elisabeth Cummings: A Still Life.

== Wedderburn ==
In 1970, Cummings began camping in a tent on bushland land owned by Barbara and Nick Romalis at Wedderburn outside Sydney. Ten acres of land was gifted to Cummings by the Romalis to be used for the building of an art studio. Cummings was joined by artists Roy Jackson, Joan Brassil, and Fred Braat. The group then purchased another 15 acres from the Romalis and invited John Peart to join them in forming Widden Weddin. The move to Wedderburn coincided with a move towards gestural abstraction in her paintings, with Cummings privileging the painting process over the subject matter. Both Cummings and Peart have been involved in campaigns to protect the environment of Wedderburn from development. In 1994 Cummings small studio was destroyed by bushfires, along with significant amounts of work. Fellow long time resident John Peart died as the result of smoke inhalation as the result of a later fire in 2013. Following the 1994 fire, Cummings built a larger studio attached to her mud brick house on the land. Her 2001 painting After the Fire, Wedderburn depicts the aftermath of the fires.

== Collections ==
- Artbank, Australia
- Art Gallery of New South Wales, NSW
- The Australia Club, NSW
- Bathurst Regional Art Gallery, NSW
- Campbelltown City Bicentennial Art Gallery, NSW
- Charles Sturt University, Wagga Wagga, NSW
- Gold Coast City Art Gallery, QLD
- College of Fine Arts, University of NSW, Sydney, NSW
- Cruthers Collection of Women’s Art, The University of Western Australia, WA
- The Drill Hall, ANU, ACT
- Grafton Regional Art Gallery, NSW
- The Hawkesbury City Art Collection, NSW
- Jackson Smith Solicitors, NSW
- James Cook University, Townsville, QLD
- Kedumba Drawing Collection
- Kelvin Grove Teachers College, Brisbane, QLD
- Lismore Regional Art Gallery, NSW
- Long Gallery & Art Collection, University of Wollongong, NSW
- Macquarie Bank
- Manly Art Gallery and Museum, NSW
- Maroondah Regional Gallery, Vic.
- Museum of Brisbane, QLD
- Mosman Art Gallery, NSW
- National Gallery of Australia, ACT
- Newcastle Region Art Gallery, NSW
- New England Regional Art Museum, NSW
- Ormond College, Vic.
- Outback Arts Inc, QLD
- Queensland Art Gallery, Brisbane, QLD
- Queensland College of Art, Griffith University, Brisbane, QLD
- The Redcliffe City Art Gallery, QLD
- Rockhampton Art Gallery, QLD
- Shoalhaven City Arts Centre, NSW
- State Gallery of NSW
- Tamworth, NSW
- University of Queensland Art Museum, Brisbane, QLD
- Waiheke Art Gallery, NZ

== Solo exhibitions ==
- 2014 A Still Life, King Street Gallery on William, Sydney
- 2013 Elisabeth Cummings [a selection of works 1982-2013], King Street Gallery on William
- 2012 Luminous: Survey Exhibition Landscapes of Elisabeth Cummings [curated by Jane Watters], SH Ervin, Observatory Hill, Sydney Monotypes: Interiors, King Street Gallery on William
- 2011 Elisabeth Cummings, New Paintings, King Street Gallery on William
- 2010 Paper Trail: 30 Years, King Street Gallery on William
- 2008 New Paintings, King Street Gallery on William
- 2007 Monotypes, King Street Gallery on Burton, Sydney
- 2006 new paintings, King Street Gallery on Burton, Sydney
- 2005 Chapman Gallery, Canberra
- 2004 Painting, King Street Gallery on Burton, Sydney
- 2003 Painting, King Street Gallery at Span Galleries, Melbourne paintings, Pandanus Art, Currumbin Beach, Qld
- 2002 New Paintings, King Street Gallery on Burton, Sydney Elisabeth Cummings & Clara Hali, Orange Regional Gallery, NSW
- 2001 Paintings and Prints, Chapman Gallery, ACT Collaborative Pots, (Barbara Romalis & Elisabeth Cummings), Chapman Gallery
- 2000 recent work, King Street Gallery on Burton Works on Paper, Sturt Gallery, Mittagong, NSW
- 1998 recent work, King Street gallery on Burton
- 1997 Survey Show (1965-1995), Gold Coast City Art Gallery, Qld, Chapman Gallery, Canberra
- 1996 Survey Show (1965-1995), Campbelltown City Bicentennial Art Gallery, NSW recent paintings, King Street Gallery on Burton Sturt Gallery, Mittagong, NSW
- 1994 New Work, King Street Gallery on Burton
- 1992 Paintings, King Street Gallery on Burton, Schubert Art Gallery, Queensland
- 1991 Budds Beach Gallery, Gold Coast, Queensland
- 1990 Victor Mace Fine Art Gallery, Brisbane
- 1989 Painters Gallery, Sydney

== Awards and art residencies ==
- 2014 Waiheke Community Art Gallery, New Zealand
- 2014 The Nock Art Foundations, Hong Kong
- 2011 Awarded OAM in recognition of services to the visual arts in Australia
- 2005–present Artist in residence, COFA printmaking department, UNSW, Sydney
- 2000 Fleurier Prize for Landscape, S.A.
- 1996 Mosman Art Prize, NSW
- 1995 Camden Art Prize, NSW
- 1992 Tattersall's Club Art Prize, Qld
- 1991 Fishers Ghost Prize, Campbelltown City Bicentennial Art Gallery
- 1989 Gold Coast Purchase Prize, Qld
- 1988 REIQ Bicentennial Art Award, Qld
- 1987 Open Section, Camden Art Prize Faber Castell Drawing Prize
- 1984 Mervyn Horton Memorial Prize, Berrima, NSW Camden Purchase Prize, NSW Friends of the Campbelltown Art Gallery Purchase
- 1983 Lane Cove Purchase Prize, NSW
- 1982 Lane Cove Purchase Prize, NSW
- 1981 Macquarie Towns Purchase Prize, NSW
- 1979 Peter Stuyvesant Prize, Shoalhaven Fishers Ghost Prize, Campbelltown City Hall Gosford Purchase Prize, NSW
- 1978 Gold Coast Purchase Prize
- 1977 Landscape and Still Life Prizes, RAS, Sydney Lismore Prize, NSW Fishers Ghost Prize, Campbelltown City Hall
- 1976 Drummoyne Prize, NSW
- 1974 Grafton Prize, NSW
- 1972 Human Image Prize, RAS, Sydney Cheltenham Prize, NSW Portia Geach Portrait Prize, Sydney
- 1971 Gold Coast Purchase Prize, QLD
- 1960 Dyason Bequest
- 1958 NSW Travelling Art Scholarship
- 1957 Le Gay Brereton Prize for Drawing

== Selected exhibition catalogues ==
- Elisabeth Cummings Journeys, 6 November – 1 December 2018, King Street Gallery, Sydney
- Raw Wedderburn, 24 June – 5 August 2018, Delmar Gallery, Sydney ISBN 978-0-6483385-0-5
- Elisabeth Cummings: New Paintings, 2015, King Street Gallery, Sydney
- Country and Western: landscape re-imagined, 24 July – 20 September 2015, perc Tucker Regional Gallery, Townsville ISBN 978-0-949461-05-6
- Your Friend the Enemy, 10 April – 17 May 2015, Drill Hall Gallery, Canberra ISBN 978-0-9942584-1-0
- Elisabeth Cummings: A Still Life, 2014, King Street Gallery, Sydney ISBN 978-0-9875540-3-1
- Elisabeth Cummings [a selection of works from 1984-2013], King Street Gallery, Sydney
- Monotypes: Interiors, 2012, King Street Gallery, Sydney
- Elisabeth Cummings, 2011, King Street Gallery, Sydney
- Paper Trail: 30 Years, 2010, King Street Gallery, Sydney ISBN 978-0-9807666-2-2
- Monotypes, 10 January – 3 February 2007, King Street Gallery, Sydney
