= Mosman Art Prize =

Australian art award

The Mosman Art Prize is an annual art award made by the corporation of Mosman, a suburb of Sydney, New South Wales. It has been running since 1947. Past adjudicators also include notable Australian art figures such as Margaret Preston, John Olsen, Tim Storrier, Jenny Sages and Edmund Capon.

== List of winners ==
- 1947 Margaret Olley for New England Landscape (inaugural prize)
- 1948 Joy Ewart for Onions Point
- 1949 Klaus Friedeberger for Mt Gillen, Alice Springs
- 1950 Guy Warren for Valley of the Albert, Queensland
- 1951 Francis Lymburner for Circular Quay
- 1952 Grace Cossington Smith for Gum Blossom and Drapery
- 1953 J Richard Ashton for Wollongong Boat Harbour
- 1954 Roy Fluke for Bridge Construction
- 1955 Hayward Veal for Noon, Montmartre, Paris
- 1956 Maximillian Feuerring for Odalisque
- 1956 Frank Hinder for Monkeys (drawing)
- 1957 Elwyn Lynn for Spring Still Life
- 1958 Roy Fluke for Steel Plant
- 1958 Tom Gleghorn for Fragment of the Crucifixion (watercolour)
- 1959 Margot Lewers for Abstraction
- 1960 Margot Lewers for Composition in Blue
- 1960 Weaver Hawkins for The Forwards (watercolour)
- 1961 Nancy Borlase for Drift
- 1962 James Grainger Phillips for Blue's Point
- 1963 Charles Reddington for Wonders and Workings of a New Place
- 1964 E Colin Williams for Landslide
- 1965 Guy Warren for Moon at Mungo Brush
- 1966 Emeritus Professor Ken Reinhard for N
- 1967 Ronald Lambert for The Dogon
- 1968 Joseph Szabo for Without - Within IV
- 1969 Stuart Maxwell for Slant
- 1970 William Peascod for Stele
- 1971 Reinis Zusters for Urban Episode
- 1972 Ross Jackson for 1970-L
- 1973 Joan Brassil for Creative Tension III - Cell Division
- 1974 Alan Oldfield for Ocean Cruise
- 1976 John Lethbridge for Slipshod
- 1976 Max Miller for Frieze (other medium)
- 1977 Aileen Rogers for Therese Delanty
- 1978 Lesley Haslewood Pockley for Still Life
- 1979 Janet Dawson for The Hawk and the Cloud
- 1980 David Hawkes for Florin Subsides
- 1981 Chris Johnson for Winter Landscape
- 1981 Lloyd Rees for Breezy Day Lane Cove (other medium)
- 1982 Jacki Fewtrell for Venetian Wilderness
- 1983 Frank McNamara for Monaro District
- 1983 Judith White for Pitt Street (non-traditional)
- 1984 Greg Hansell for Tin Shadows No.11
- 1985 Geoff Levitus for Out of Place
- 1986 John Caldwell for Central Tablelands
- 1988 Hayden Wilson for The Departure of the Mary Bryant
- 1989 Cressida Campbell for Studio
- 1990 Greg Hansell for Miss Trail's Garden, Bathurst
- 1990 John Bartley for Bull ants, blowflies and burnt chops (non-traditional)
- 1991 Anthony Galbraith for Untitled 56 (joint winner)
- 1991 Rodney Milgate for Landscape with Figures
- 1992 Bob Marchant for The Young Don Bradman
- 1992 Kilmeny Niland for Vita with Violet
- 1993 Nicholas Harding for Newtown Station
- 1994 Jenny Sages for 3am
- 1995 Dianna Portingale for Marmalade and Tea
- 1996 Elisabeth Cummings for The Music Room
- 1997 Francis Giacco for Polyptch
- 1998 Judith White for Cultivation (Series) Floodplain
- 1999 Tim Johnson for Maitreya
- 2000 Lucy Culliton for Still Life/White Ground
- 2001 Guan Wei for Gazing into Deep Space No.8 (1-3)
- 2002 Roy Jackson for Gulgan Flats
- 2003 Noel McKenna for 5 Birds
- 2004 Peter Godwin for The Duck Salon/A memory
- 2005 Adam Cullen for Surfer Joe was Light Horse (joint winner)
- 2005 Tom Carment for Ships at Sea (WA) (joint winner)
- 2006 Fan Dongwang for Descendant
- 2007 James Powditch for Butterfly Effects
- 2008 Jasper Knight for Wharf with Yellow Palings
- 2009 Alex Lavroff for Amish Bucket with Capsicums in Colander
- 2010 Craig Waddell for I remember you as you were my beauty
- 2011 Kerrie Lester for Out on a Limb
- 2012 David Fairbairn for Seated Figure J.B. with orange ground
- 2013 Rachel Ellis for Bathurst landscape - William Street
- 2014 Michael Muir for Past the Stacks
- 2015 Alan Jones for Painting 131 (North Coogee)
- 2016 Michael Zavros for Flora
- 2017 Jumaadi for Some Kind of Record
- 2018 Natasha Walsh for The Cicarda
- 2019 Paul Kelleher for The party is over
- 2020 Salote Tawale for Mangroves
- 2021 Jacobus Capone for Fallen Golden Wattle and Seawater
- 2023 David Griggs (artist), The stitches and the melanoma
- 2024 Gemma Smith, for Pollen Prism
