= Brassil =

Brassil is a surname. Notable people with the surname include:

- Joan Brassil (1919–2005), Australian artist
- John Brassil (born 1963), Irish politician
- Niall Brassil (born 1999), Irish hurler

Brassil is also the former name of the modern country of Brazil.
