= David Fairbairn =

David Fairbairn may refer to:

- David Fairbairn (politician) (1917–1994), Australian politician and cabinet minister
- David Fairbairn (artist) (born 1949), Australian painter and printmaker
