= Roy Jackson (artist) =

Australian artist

Roy Jackson (1944–2013) was an Australian contemporary artist, one of a group of artists based at Widden Weddin, Wedderburn. His work is part of the permanent collections of Artbank, the National Gallery of Australia, the Art Gallery of New South Wales, and the National Gallery of Victoria.

== Early life ==
Jackson was born in South London, England in 1944. At the age of 13 he was selected under the Tripartite System of education to attend Sutton East Technical College School of Art, one of several junior art schools run by County Councils in the post-war era. George Mackley, a master craftsman of wood engraving who had trained as a teacher of art at Goldsmiths’ College, London, was the enlightened headmaster. Mackley stated in his article entitled 'Art in Adolescence or What You Will' (1959) for 'The New Era Journal' that "art is not fundamentally a purely manual process. Its spirit is born in the mind, and its body is fashioned by the hand".

Jackson went to Australia at age 15 with his parents, who migrated as Ten Pound Poms. He returned a year later to complete his art education at Sutton, then Wimbledon College of Art, where he was in the first cohort of the new, “degree equivalent”, National Diploma in Design (Dip AD), which he was awarded in 1965 by the National Council for Diplomas in Art and Design.

== Career ==
Jackson returned to Australia in the mid-1960s and, from 1968, taught part-time on and off for three decades at East Sydney Technical College, where he met Elisabeth Cummings. Jackson and Cummings were two of the four founding members of Widden Weddin in Wedderburn, New South Wales. They built their studios on 10 acres of land, alongside Joan Brassil and Fred Braat. John Peart joined in the 1980s, with the extension of the site up to 25 acres. Widden Weddin remained Jackson's "base" for 38 years.

Jackson travelled extensively to remote locations in Australia. His paintings celebrate this. One of his paintings, ‘Jowalbinna bushcamp’ (1989), which was purchased by the National Gallery of Australia, relates to his trips in the late 1980s and 1990s to this conservation area of rock art galleries in the Cape York Peninsula. The property and bush camp named Jowalbinna were leased to Percy Trezise, who began exploring and recording the Quinkan rock art in the 1960s; it was finally inscribed on the Australian National Heritage List in 2018.

Another significant painting named ‘Gilgai Gibber Plains’ (1994) was shortlisted for the Wynne Prize in 1997 and donated to the collection of the Art Gallery of New South Wales by the estate of Roy Jackson in 2015. Jackson was a finalist for the Wynne Prize on numerous other occasions (1990: ‘Small house bright land’, 1998: ‘Jump-up country’, 2000: ‘Ewaninga’, 2001: ‘Desert moon’, 2002: ‘Upper Macleay’, 2003: ‘Line- Along Line’). Jackson was also a finalist for the Sir John Sulman Prize on four occasions (1996: ‘Turning stones into stars’, 1998: ‘Beachcombing near Cooktown’, 2003: ‘Inch time foot gem’, 2007: ‘Blue note’). Jackson was awarded other art prizes, including the Maitland Art Prize in 1997 for ‘Last light’ (judged by Edmund Capon) and the Mosman Art Prize in 2002 for ‘Gulgan Flats’ (judged by Terence Maloon), both works entering the respective collections.

In an exhibition at the University of Sydney War Memorial Art Gallery in 2003, Jackson was exhibited alongside Ian Fairweather and Tony Tuckson, both British-born and educated Australian painters.

In 1995, Jackson divided his time between Australia and the UK. He established a studio in Northumberland, near Hadrian's Wall, which became his UK "base", enabling him to travel to remote locations in Europe, particularly Greece. Jackson had lived on the small Greek island of Poros for nine months in 1973. In England, Jackson had solo exhibitions in two northern regional art centres, Queen's Hall, Hexham and The Customs House, South Shields in 2001. Jackson's exploration of colour and form in the works exhibited in 2001 was of interest to Anya Hurlbert, Professor of Visual Neuroscience at Newcastle University, who invited him to exhibit on the occasion of the opening of the new Henry Wellcome Building, Institute of Neuroscience.

Jackson had a retrospective exhibition at the Australian National University Drill Hall Gallery which opened in 2013, shortly after his premature death from cancer. This exhibition toured to the S.H Ervin Gallery and then on to Maitland Regional Art Gallery and other regional art centres in Wollongong, Tamworth and Orange, New South Wales. The retrospective was accompanied by the monograph ‘Roy Jackson hands on’.

== Artistic philosophy ==
Jackson's work was about “conveying a sense of place or a sense of a sensation”. It was “not sufficient to provide a snapshot of life, in the manner of a realist painter”. Jackson was strongly inspired by the bushland landscape around his Wedderburn home, once saying, "If someone asks me what has influenced me most in my work, I simply point to the landscape of this place".
