= Joan Brassil =

Australian artist (1919–2015)

Joan Brassil AM
- Born: 1919
- Died: 2005 (aged 85–86)
- Known for: Sculpture and Installation Art
- Awards: Australia Council for the Arts' Visual Arts/Craft Board Emeritus Award

Rita Joan Brassil AM (1919–2005) was an Australian artist who worked with many elements – light, sound, stones and gravel, printed poems, and electronics – to create installation art works that relate to nature. She began exhibiting her work in 1976, after she retired from teaching art in high schools. She participated in many solo and group exhibitions across Australia as well as in Taiwan and Italy. Brassil was one of the first artists to receive the Australia Council for the Arts' Visual Arts/Craft Board Emeritus Award in 1988. On 26 January 2000, Joan was awarded an AM (Order of Australia, Ordinary Member) for service to the visual arts in Australia, and overseas as a sculptor.

== Biography ==
She was born Rita Joan Foster in August 1919 in Sydney, New South Wales, Australia. She attended Sydney Teachers' College (1937–1939) and in 1940 studied at East Sydney Technical College. She then taught art in high schools for more than two decades.

In 1969 she began studies at the Power Institute at Sydney University and continued into 1971. Her first solo exhibition was in 1975 at the Sculpture Centre, Sydney. She received her doctorate in creative arts from Wollongong University and an honorary doctorate from the College of Fine Arts, University of New South Wales.

She lived and worked in Wedderburn, New South Wales, 60 kilometres south of Sydney, where she was active in Wedderburn artistic community.

== Work ==
Brassil said that an early influence was the Russian abstract artist Kazimir Malevich. In some works, Brassil focused on ideas of perception and memory of the landscape. In later works she became interested in sound sculptures. Her sound sculpture A Tether of Time is located the sculpture garden at the Campbelltown Arts Centre.

In 1973 she was awarded the Mosman Art Prize for Creative Tension III – Cell Division.

Brassil died in April 2005 and her memorial service was in Campbelltown, Sydney. The Sydney Morning Herald noted: "'Deceptively simple and yet utterly confounding' was the description given to one of her installations, The Breath of Psyche, by Dr Susan Best, senior lecturer in art at the University of NSW. It sums up Brassil's work: its physical elements accessible but its meaning an invigorating intellectual challenge."

== Exhibitions ==
In the 1980s and 1990s she participated in many group and solo exhibitions, including at regional and state galleries, and in triennials and special exhibitions of sculpture and video art. In 2015 the Campbelltown Arts Centre held a retrospective of her work.
