= Fort Phillip (Sydney) =

- Observatory Hill, Sydney, New South Wales in Australia
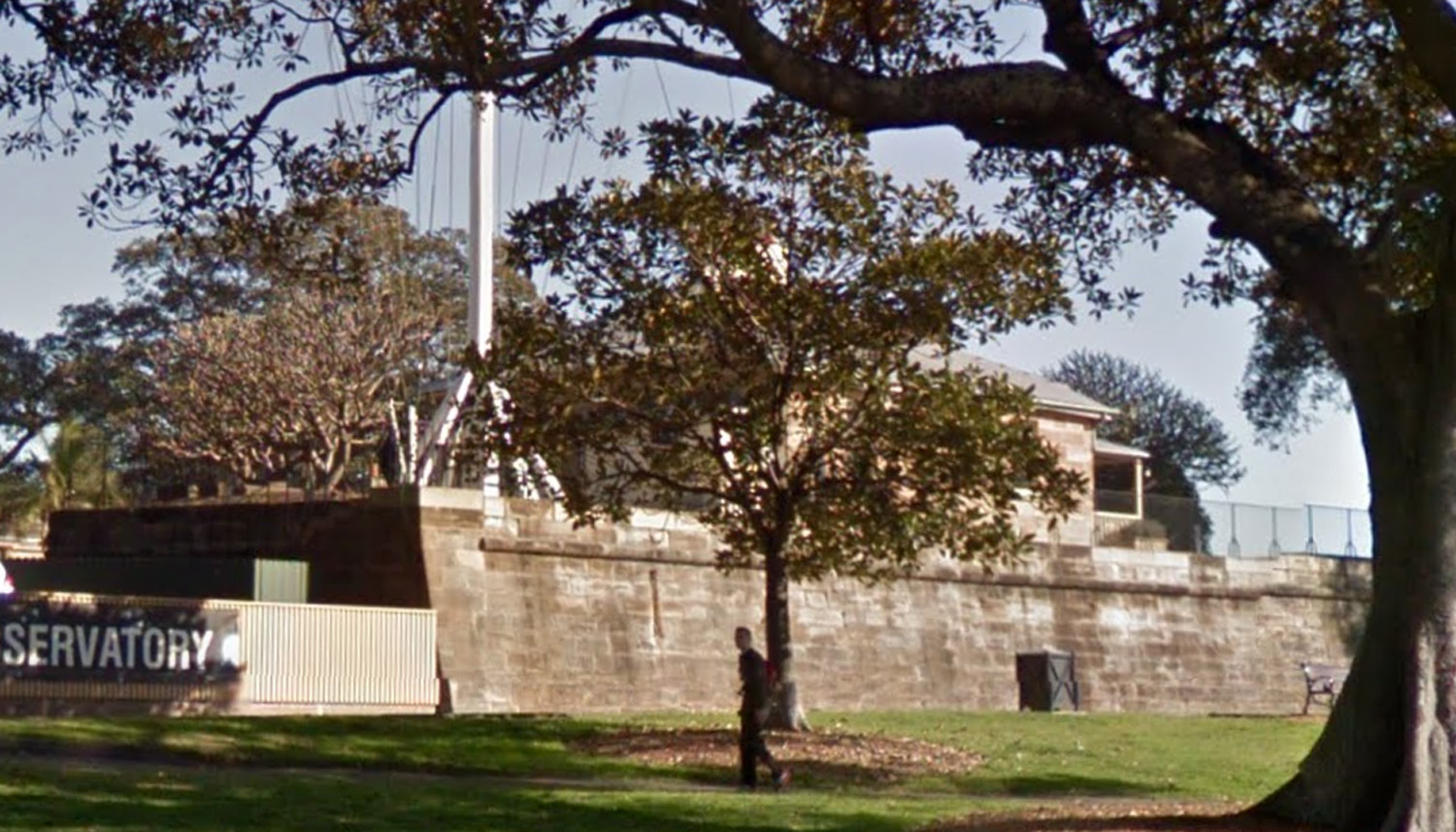
- Remains of Fort Phillip today

Site information
- Type: Former fort

Location
- Location of Fort Phillip in Sydney central business district
- Coordinates: 33°51′34″S 151°12′17″E

Site history
- In use: 1803 – 1840s
- Fate: Partially demolished and repurposed as the Sydney Observatory from 1858.

Fort Phillip was a citadel style fort constructed as part of the first defensive works of the penal settlement of Sydney, located on Observatory Hill in the Sydney suburb of Millers Point, New South Wales, Australia. The fort has been demolished and the local government heritage-listed site repurposed as the Sydney Observatory.

== History ==
Governor John Hunter ordered a fort to be built and Fort Phillip was commissioned in 1804 by the third New South Wales Governor (in office 1800–1806), Philip Gidley King, partly as a response to external threats such as a possible French attack in 1803 and partly due to the internal unrest from rebellious convicts reflected in Australia's only major convict rebellion at Castle Hill in March 1804. This was dubbed the Battle of Vinegar Hill as most of the convict rebels were Irish. Windmill Hill (later Observatory Hill) was chosen as a fort location as it was the highest point above the colony, affording commanding views of the Harbour approaches from east and west, the river and road to Parramatta, surrounding country and of the entire town below. The fort was never fully completed and never fired a single shot in anger.

A flagstaff was built in 1825 on the eastern wall of the fort, which sent messages to ships in the harbour and the signal station at Fort Denison and South Head.

During 1847-48, a new signal station, designed by the colonial architect Mortimer Lewis, was built to replace the flagstaff. The fort was subsequently demolished leaving the eastern rampart as the only remaining evidence of the fort's existence.

Sydney Observatory was built on the site in 1858 to provide accurate time readings for the colony and to observe stars in the southern sky.

The fort is commemorated in the name of Fort Street High School.

== See also ==
- Military history of Australia
