= David Dridan =

Australian artist

David Clyde Dridan (born 15 December 1932) is a South Australian artist, known for painting landscapes in oils. He has been active in promoting tourism and appreciation of wine and art in the Fleurieu Peninsula of the State.

== History ==
Dridan was born in Adelaide to Harold Dridan (1894–1966), later Harold Clyde Dridan, cinema manager in Adelaide and land agent of Renmark, South Australia, and his wife Thelma Aileen Dridan. An only son, his sister Dawn Eleanor Dridan was born in Tasmania on 18 May 1925. He was educated at Renmark Town School followed by Saint Peter's College, Adelaide and 1949–1950 studied art at the South Australian School of Art under Jacqueline Hick and Joseph Choate, who was also art master at Thebarton Technical School and, later, St Peter's College. He undertook further studies at the East Sydney Technical College in 1956, receiving encouragement from Russell Drysdale, who became a lifelong friend.

In 1961, on a grant from the British Council, he travelled to London and studied gallery administration at the Victoria and Albert Museum, also taking in the London Polytechnic, Tate Gallery, and the National Gallery. He returned to South Australia and served as curator at the Art Gallery of South Australia 1962–1964 and as senior art master at his old college. He founded a private gallery at North Adelaide in 1966 and later established a vineyard and winery at Clarendon, where he also conducted private classes.

In 1975 Dridan founded his winery, and over some 25 years commissioned various artists to create works on the heads (ends) of his wine barrels. When he sold the establishment he had the 27 artworks framed and conserved as the "Clarendon barrel end collection".

He founded "The Barn" gallery in McLaren Vale.

He founded the Fleurieu Art Prize for Australian landscapes, and was a regular contributor to the Fleurieu Peninsula Biennale.

He was curator of the State Bank of South Australia's collection of Australian Art, which suffered water damage c. 1985 when the water tank atop the State Bank building (later Santos building) ruptured.

He was a longtime friend of Barry Humphries, and major collector of Humphries' paintings; they collaborated on some works.

== Recognition ==
Dridan was awarded an Order of Australia in the 2007 New Year's awards, citing service to the arts and to the community.

== Family ==
Dridan married Sarah Gosse In 1963. They had three children.

== Works ==
His paintings are among those held by HRH The Duke of Edinburgh; the National Gallery of Australia, Canberra; Art Gallery of South Australia; Art Gallery of Western Australia, Perth; Queen Victoria Museum and Art Gallery, Launceston; and Rockhampton Art Gallery, Rockhampton, Queensland.

His painting Hills Landscape (1969) is held at Carrick Hill. Dridan was a great friend of the Haywards, who built that historic residence. He was later a member of the Carrick Hill Interim Committee, and founding member of the Carrick Hill Trust.

== Bibliography ==
- David Dridan; Ian George (2008). Artists of the Fleurieu. Country Arts SA, Port Adelaide.
- Ray Crooke; David Dridan (1983). Australian landscapes, October 11th to November 11th, 1983. Thomas Agnew & Sons, London.
- David Dridan; Pip Forrester (2013). Clarendon barrel ends collection. Kwik Kopy, Hilton.
