= Sydney Observatory =

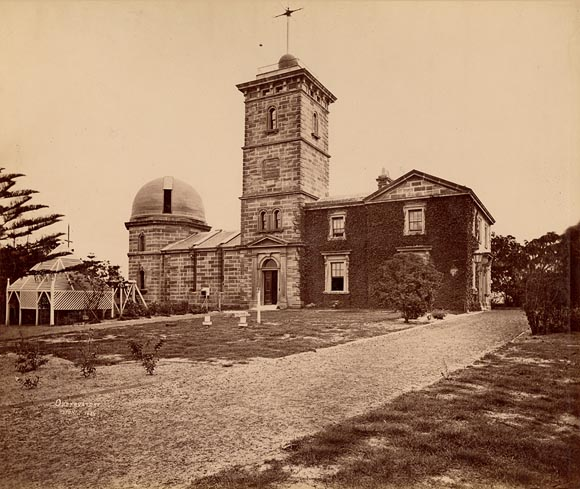
- The observatory photographed in 1874

- Location within Sydney Location within Australia
- 33.8596°S 151.2047°E
- Location: Upper Fort Street, Millers Point, City of Sydney, New South Wales, Australia

History
- Built: 1857–1859

Site notes
- Architects: William Weaver (plans); Alexander Dawson (supervision)
- Architectural style: Florentine Renaissance

New South Wales Heritage Register
- Official name: Sydney Observatory; The Sydney Observatory; Observatory; Fort Phillip; Windmill Hill; Flagstaff Hill
- Type: State heritage (complex / group)
- Designated: 22 December 2000
- Reference no.: 1449
- Type: Observatory
- Category: Scientific Facilities
- Builders: Charles Bingemann & Ebenezer Dewar

The Sydney Observatory is a heritage-listed meteorological station, astronomical observatory, function venue, science museum, and education facility located on Observatory Hill at Upper Fort Street, in the inner city Sydney suburb of Millers Point in the City of Sydney local government area of New South Wales, Australia. It was designed by William Weaver (plans) and Alexander Dawson (supervision) and built from 1857 to 1859 by Charles Bingemann & Ebenezer Dewar. It is also known as The Sydney Observatory; Observatory; Fort Phillip; Windmill Hill; and Flagstaff Hill. It was added to the New South Wales State Heritage Register on 22 December 2000.

The site was formerly a defence fort, semaphore station, time ball station, meteorological station, observatory and windmills. The site evolved from a fort built on 'Windmill Hill' in the early 19th century to an observatory within the following 100 years. It is now a working museum where evening visitors can observe the stars and planets through a modern 40-centimetre (16 in) Schmidt-Cassegrain telescope and an historic 29-centimetre (11 in) refractor telescope built in 1874, the oldest telescope in Australia in regular use.

== History ==
=== Early use of the site ===
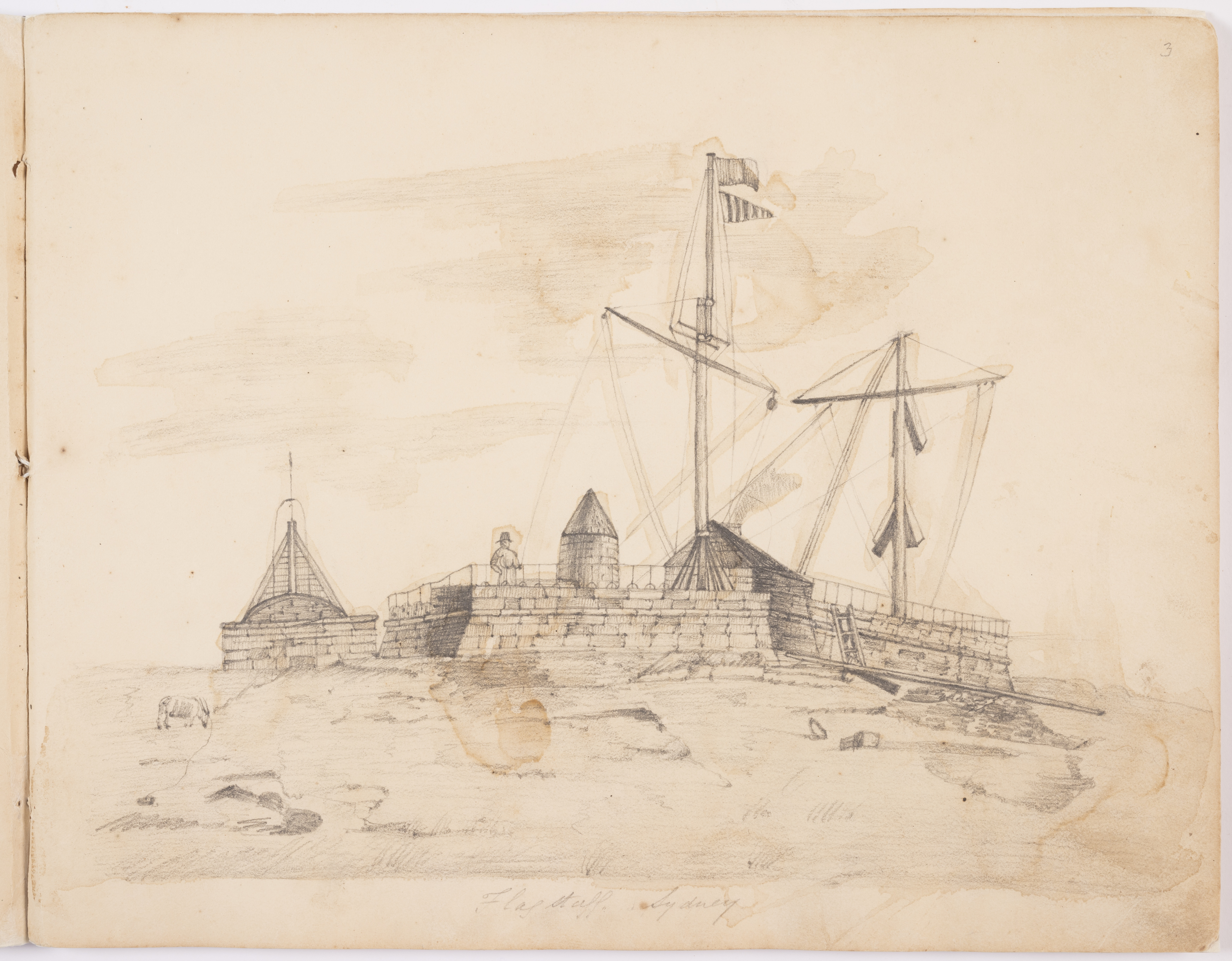
Fort Phillip, Flagstaff Hill, Sydney, c. 1841

The site of the Sydney Observatory has been a significant place in Sydney and has undergone a number of name changes. It was known as Windmill Hill in the 1790s when it was the site of the first windmill. After 1804 references are made to it as Fort Phillip or Citadel Hill, referring to the construction, but never completion, of a citadel on the site at Governor King's instruction for use in the case of an insurrection in Sydney. This was prompted by an influx of "Death or Liberty" Boys after the abortive 1798 uprising in Ireland, some of whom he believed to be of the most desperate character and cause for constant suspicion. Construction began but the citadel was not completed until Bligh had been installed in office. There were further discussions about a citadel during the Macquarie period but nothing eventuated beyond a half-built powder magazine, Francis Greenway's first work after his appointment as civil architect in 1815.

In 1797, early on during the European settlement of New South Wales, Australia, a windmill was built on the hill above the first settlement. Within ten years the windmill had deteriorated to the point of being useless; the canvas sails were stolen, a storm damaged the machinery, and already by 1800 the foundations were giving way. The name of Millers Point remembers this early land use.

In 1803, Fort Philip was built on the site under the direction of Governor Hunter to defend the new settlement against a possible attack by the French and also from rebellious convicts. The fort was never required to be used for any such purposes. In 1825 the eastern wall of the fort was converted to a signal station. Flags were used to send messages to ships in the harbour and to the signal station on the South Head of the harbour.

The site was known as Flagstaff Hill during and after the Macquarie era. A flagstaff had been erected on the site by 1811. Flag signalling was a cumbersome process and Commissioner Bigge advised Macquarie that it was expedient to erect a semaphore at South Head and Fort Phillip. The flag and semaphore were used for signalling in a variety of combinations.

=== Observatory ===
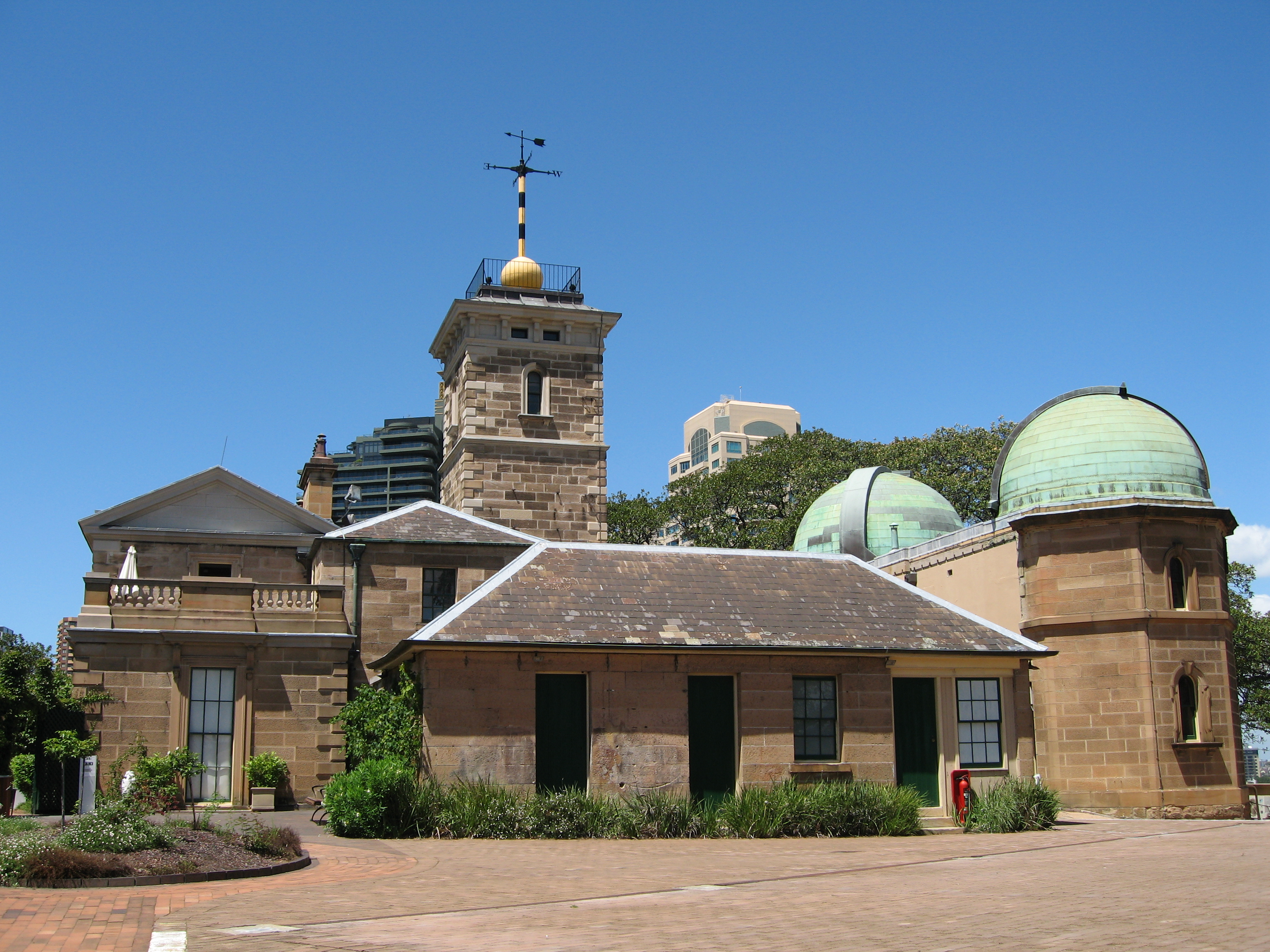
The observatory today

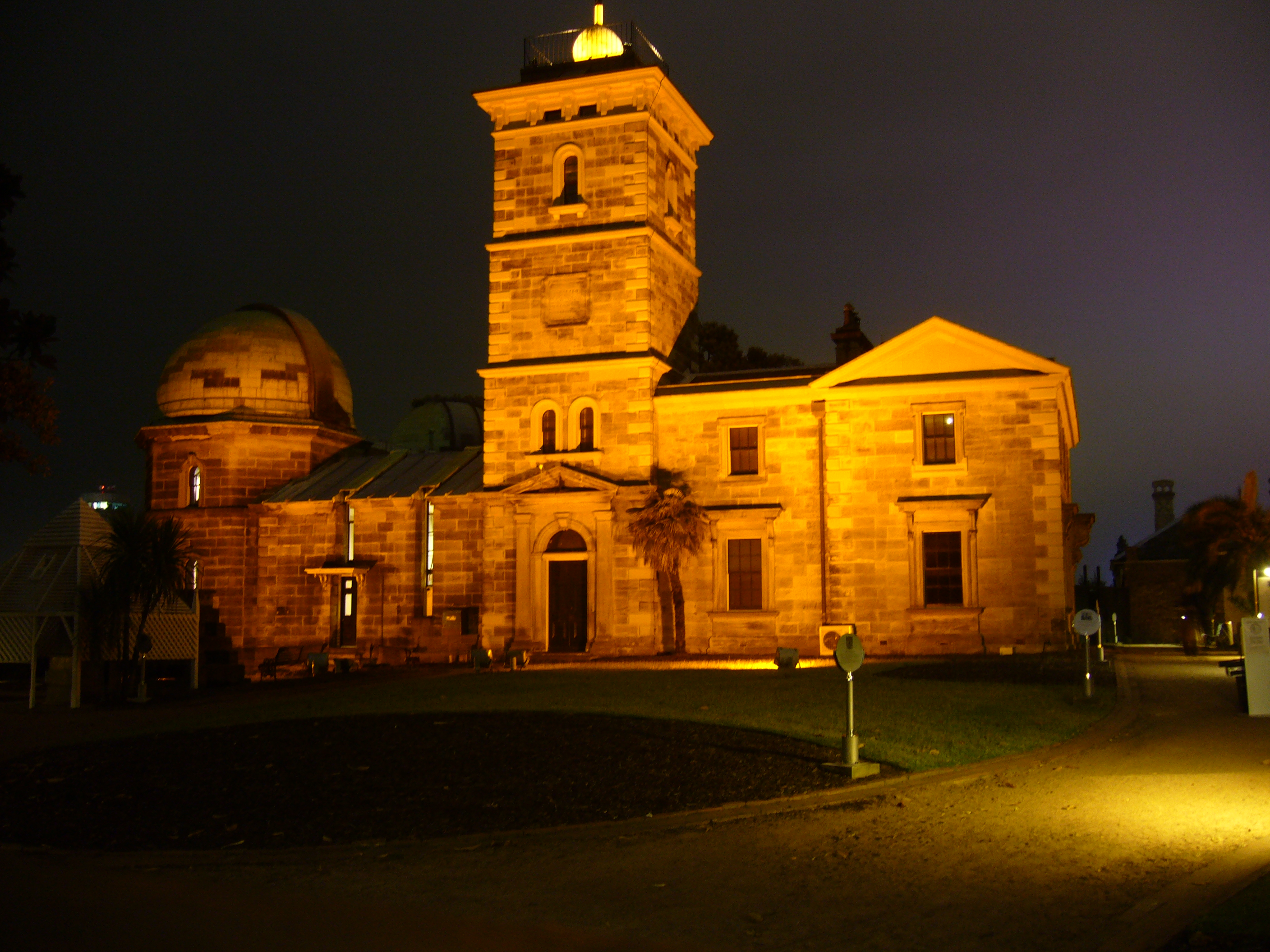
Sydney Observatory at night

An early observatory was established in 1788 by William Dawes on Dawes Point, at the foot of Observatory Hill, in an ultimately unsuccessful attempt to observe in 1790 the return of a comet suggested by Edmond Halley (not Halley's Comet but a different one).

In 1848, a new signal station was built by the Colonial Architect, Mortimer Lewis, on top of the fort wall on Windmill Hill. At the instigation of the Governor, Sir William Denison, it was agreed seven years later to build a full observatory next to the signal station. The first Government Astronomer, William Scott, was appointed in 1856, and work on the new observatory was completed in 1858.

The most important role of the observatory was to provide time through the time-ball tower. Every day at exactly 1.00 pm, the time-ball on top of the tower would drop to signal the correct time to the city and harbour below. At the same time a cannon on Dawes Point was fired; later the cannon was moved to Fort Denison. The first time-ball was dropped at noon on 5 June 1858. Soon after the drop was rescheduled to one o'clock. The time-ball is still dropped daily at 1pm using the original mechanism, but with the aid of an electric motor, not as in the early days when the ball was raised manually.

After the federation of Australia in 1901, meteorology became a function for the Commonwealth Government from 1908, while the observatory continued its astronomical role. The observatory continued to contribute observations to The astrographic catalogue, kept time and provided information to the public. For example, each day the observatory supplied Sydney newspapers with the rising and setting times of the sun, moon and planets. A proposal to close the observatory in 1926 was narrowly avoided, but, by the mid-1970s, the increasing problems of air pollution and city light made work at the observatory more and more difficult. In 1982, the NSW Government decided that Sydney Observatory was to be converted into a museum of astronomy and related fields as part of what is now the Powerhouse Museum.

In November 1821 Governor Brisbane arrived with a set of astronomical instruments, a plan for an observatory and two personal employees with astronomical expertise - Carl Rümker and James Dunlop. Brisbane set up an observatory at the Governor's residence in Parramatta. Problems developed between Brisbane and Rümker. Rümker lost his position and it was not until Brisbane had been recalled that Rümker was reinstated by the Colonial Secretary. The following year Governor Darling, the new Governor, appointed Rümker as Government Astronomer, the first to hold the title in Australia. In 1831 Dunlop was appointed Superintendent at the observatory, Rümker again losing his position while on a visit to London.

Brisbane's instruments remained at Parramatta when he left and they were used in that observatory until it was closed in 1847. The recommendation for the closure came from a commission appointed by Governor Fitzroy at the prompting of London. Dunlop had become increasingly frail and negligent and the Parramatta observatory had fallen into decay. The instruments were placed in ordnance storage at the urge of Phillip Parker King, a leading astronomer in Australia.

==== Construction of an observatory ====
King argued that a government observatory should be set up, and not just the suggested time ball. King's preference for Fort Phillip to be the site was eventually accepted. In the eight years from Edmund Blacket's modest 1850 plan for the time ball observatory until its completion, the plans underwent progressive enlargement. The 1850 plan was a 4-by-4-metre (13 by 14 ft) room for a transit telescope and timekeeping apparatus with a small ante-room. In 1851 an enlarged version was presented to the Colonial Secretary but it had no time ball tower, because neither King or Blacket, the Colonial Architect, knew how it worked. The need for an Observer's dwelling was noted.

Plans were redrawn in the next couple of years. When Blacket resigned in 1854 to take on the design and supervision of construction of The University of Sydney, plans were underway for an observatory that would be both functional and of architectural quality. Blacket's successor, William Weaver, replaced him on the observatory project. Weaver was appointed Colonial Architect in October 1854. Correspondence from him to Blacket in the early years indicates that Weaver was much happier in direct supervision of works than performing the duties of his desk-bound role. As head of an over-loaded department, he complained:

"The arrangements for the performance of the various works, the official correspondence, the number of reports, and the examination of accounts, absorb nearly the whole time of the head of department, who practically can have little or no professional oversight of any work".

A Select Committee on the Colonial Architect's Department in August 1855 questioned an overpayment to the stonemasonry contractor of the Dead House at Circular Quay and accused him of defrauding the Government. Weaver, as head of the department, was accused of negligence for paying him and subsequently submitted his resignation in apparent disgust. Weaver was only 18 months as Colonial Architect and of the two major architectural works to come from his department during his term in office, the Government Printing Office at the corner of Phillip and Bent Streets no longer stands and the Sydney Observatory has been generally attributed to his successor. In fact, Sir William Denison approved Weaver's plans "for an Observatory and Astronomical resicence" in August 1855 after some specifications supplied by Denison had been incorporated. When building commenced a year later the new Colonial Architect Alexander Dawson adopted those plans.

Little more was done until the arrival of Sir William Denison as Governor General in January 1855. Denison saw an observatory as an important addition to the colony. As a result, the £600 allocated to the time ball and building was augmented by an additional vote of £7,000 for a complete observatory and Denison wrote to the Astronomer Royal asking him to find a competent astronomer. Plans and estimates were submitted in August 1855 but Denison decided to defer the final decision on the site and design until the arrival of the astronomer.

Alexander Dawson replaced Weaver as Colonial Architect in April 1856 and the new Government Astronomer, Reverend William Scott, M.A., arrived with his family in October that year. Tenders for the construction were advertised in February 1857. The successful tenderers were Charles Bingemenn and Ebenezer Dewar. The plans used appear to have been the work of Dawson rather than those of his predecessors, there being numerous references by Scott to consultations with the Colonial Architect on the design of the building. Extra work was approved after Bingemann and Dewar won their tender. This included the addition of a telescope dome and an increase in the height of the time ball tower. This increased height caused some dismay for Scott as it blocked out an increased area of the eastern sky.

The completed building combined, for the first time in a major Sydney building, two architectural streams - Italian High Renaissance Palazzo and the Italian Villa forms. These contributed the symmetry of the townhouse facade for the residence and an asymmetry for the observatory born of the peculiar needs of transit room, equatorial dome and time ball tower. The building was thus elevated from basic necessity to fashionable stylishness. Dawson's budget had enabled him to emphasise the distinction between the private and the public, the domestic and the official. The style and form was overlaid with early Victorian theories of fitness and association, that style should be chosen to indicate the nature and status of the building and in some cases, the site.

==== Operations, 1858 to 1980s ====
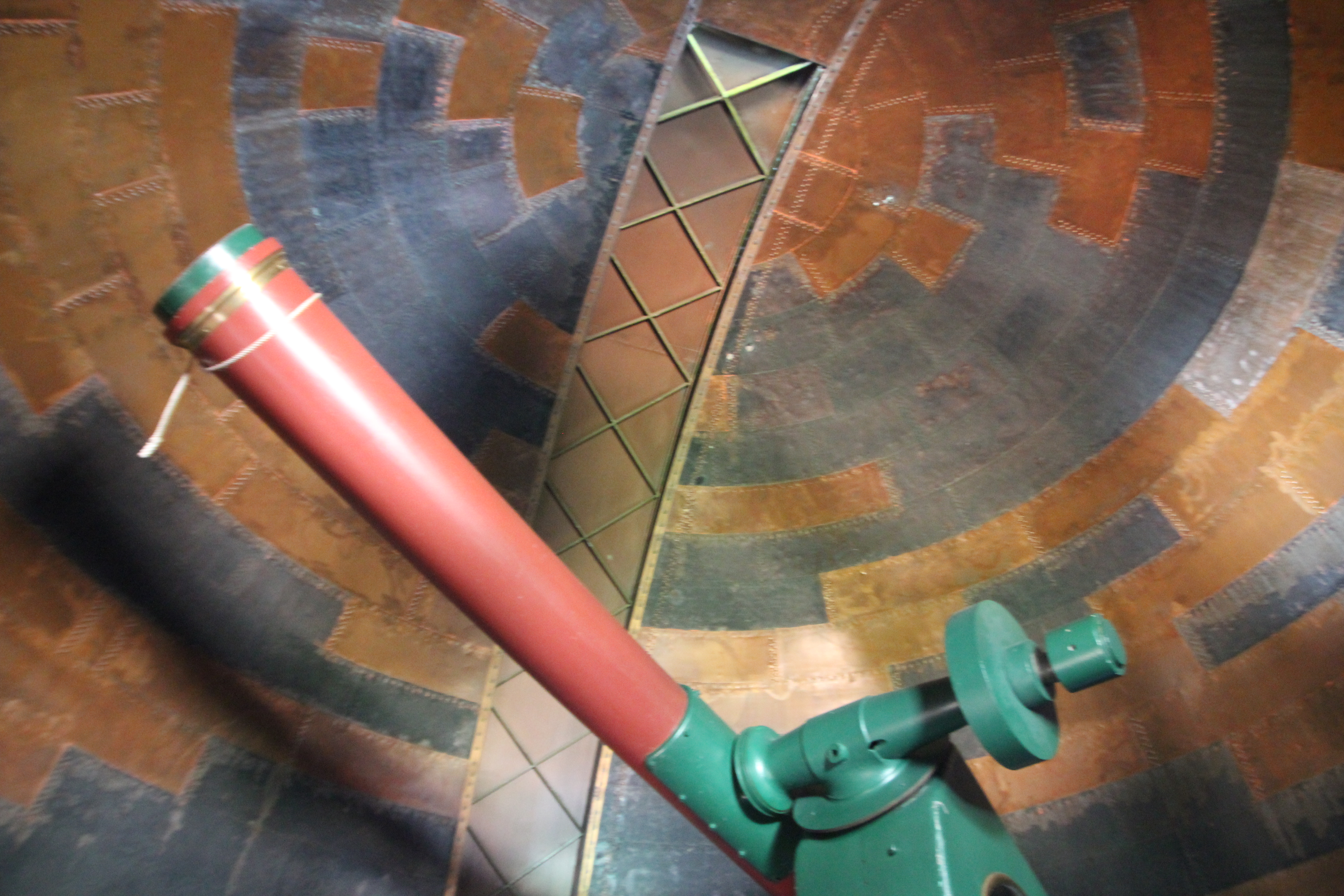
A telescope of Sydney Observatory

Scott occupied the residence in 1858 and commenced a trial operation of the time ball in June. His initial equipment was modest, mostly the instruments from Parramatta. He did, however, obtain the money for an equatorial telescope. In 1862 Scott resigned, recommending prominent amateur astronomer John Tebbutt as his replacement. Tebbutt declined the offer and the search for a replacement was commenced. In the meantime, his assistant Henry Chamberlain Russell was left in charge of the observatory. In January 1864 the new appointee George Robarts Smalley arrived and Russell was his second in command.

In 1870 Smalley died and was replaced by Russell. Russell's talent, entrepreneurial flair, intimate knowledge of how to work the political and bureaucratic system of NSW and longevity gave him a 35-year tenure as Government Astronomer and made him the Grand Old Man of physical science in the colonies. It was during Russell's period that Sydney Observatory was popularly believed to have been at its professional zenith, particularly from the 1870s through to the 1890s. Russell wasted no time in pressing the government for the necessary physical and instrumental resources to carry out his astronomical programs at the observatory. The addition of a west wing designed by colonial architect James Barnett was the main work resulting from this. It provided for a major ground floor room for Russell, a library, a second equatorial dome on a tower at its northern extremity which removed the blind spot imposed by the time ball tower. An enlarged Muntz metal dome was also placed on the old equatorial tower to accommodate a new Schroeder telescope. The telescope remains a prized and functional possession today. Russell also turned his attention to improving the residence, claiming it was not large enough to accommodate his family. In 1875 Russell succeeded in securing an extension of the observatory enclosure. Like his predecessors, he had been concerned with the restrictive nature of the observatory grounds which made siting of meteorological and auxiliary astronomical instruments difficult, if not impossible. This extension, together with the adjacent signal station give the site its present symmetrical perimeter. The Astrographic Catalogue was Russell's greatest commitment and would affect programs at the observatory for 80 years. His interest in the application of photography to astronomy and a visit to Paris in 1887 prompted Russell to take part in a "great star catalogue". The Sydney Zone of the catalogue was a massive logistical enterprise and was not practically completed until 1964. Russell died in 1907 after taking leave for an extended period of time due to ill health. His assistant Alfred Lenehan was appointed acting Government Astronomer during this period and later Government Astronomer in 1907. However, in 1906 a premier's conference resolved that the Commonwealth Government would take over meteorological work, leaving astronomy to the states. Thus, the meteorological section of the observatory became a Commonwealth agency under the direction of a former officer of the observatory, Henry Hunt. Lenehan and Hunt continuously quarrelled and did not develop a good working relationship.

In January 1908 Lenehan had a stroke and never returned to work. At the same time the Commonwealth agency was installed in the observatory residence. William Edward Raymond, the officer responsible for transit work, became officer in charge for four years, until the appointment of William Ernest Cooke in 1912. Cooke was lured to Sydney from Perth Observatory with promises of a new site located in Wahroongah, then free of city lights and traffic, the purchase of modern instruments and a world trip to investigate the latest developments. None of these eventuated during Cooke's fourteen years at the observatory. In 1916 the board of visitors to the observatory was reconstituted. Russell had allowed it to lapse during his term of office and in 1917 the residence was again inhabited by the Astronomer.

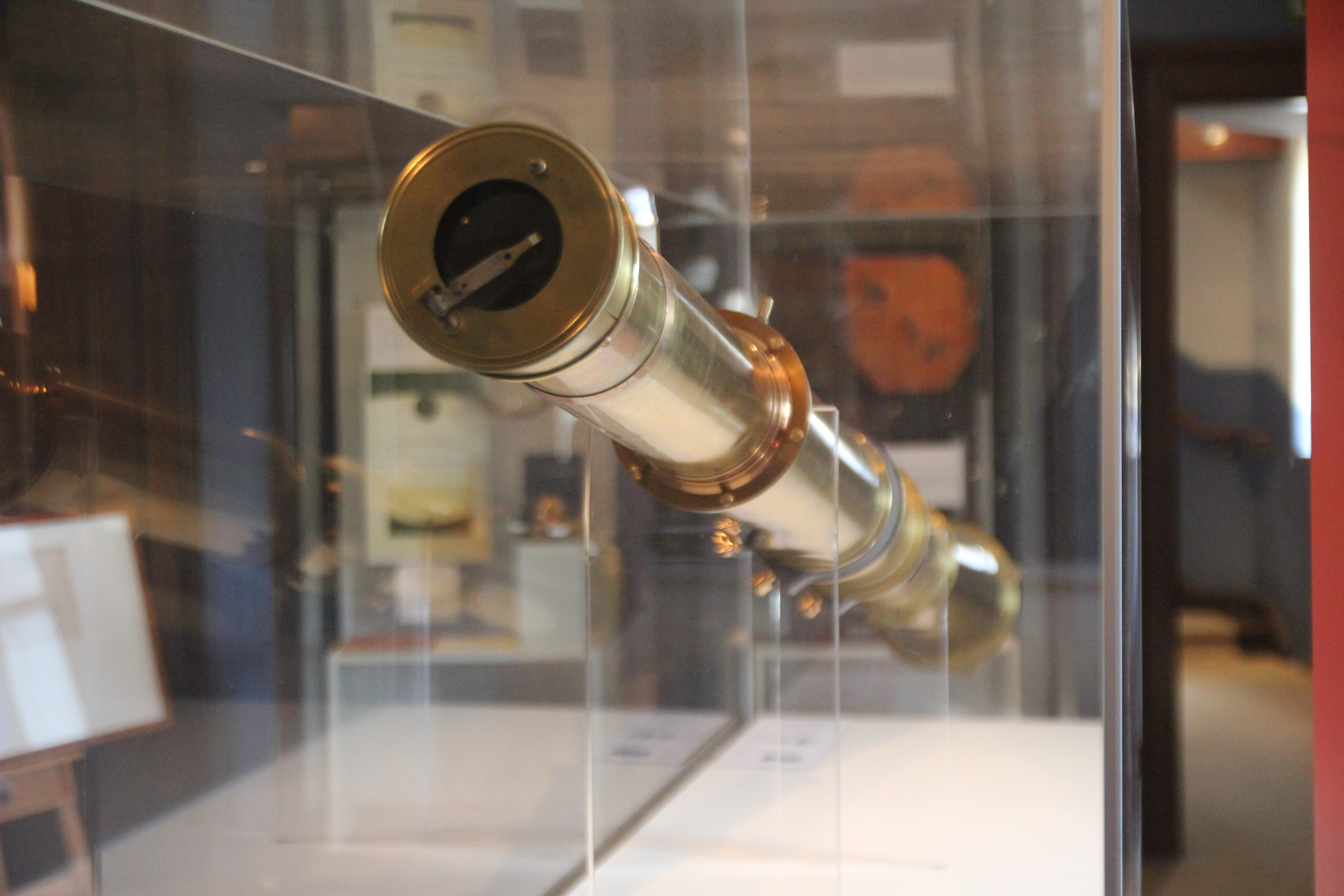
Photoheliograph used to photograph the sun

All government astronomers from Scott to Cooke were worried about increasing levels of city light, vibration from traffic and magnetic disturbance which rendered the Flagstaff Hill site increasingly unsuitable. Recommendations had been made by Smalley in 1864 and others in the first quarter of the twentieth century. While Russell had managed to have the astrographic telescope relocated to Pennant Hills, there was general worry over the reaction to the cost of relocation of the whole observatory. In July 1925 Cooke wrote to his minister pointing out the problems at the site and with the equipment. The State Cabinet took him at his word and in October decided to close the observatory rather than face the cost of removal and re-equipment. However, protests from the Board of Visitors, the Royal Society of NSW, the NSW Branch of the British Astronomical Association, the University of Sydney and interested members of the public caused the Government to change its mind and allow the observatory to continue - but with a heavily reduced staff and program. Most of the staff were transferred to other departments and Cooke was retired the following year. Only the time ball and completion of the astrographic program survived. This experience inhibited later Government Astronomers in their arguments for a new site.

Two World Wars, a great depression and a commitment to a logistically exacting astrographic program helped reduce the vitality of the establishment in the twentieth century. The deployment of major resources to the astrographic program became something of an incubus as the twentieth century progressed. The Government Astronomers could not suspend or abort the program even if they had thought it desirable. At the same time the fulfilment of international obligations under the program was largely instrumental in the survival of the observatory.

The completion of the program in 1964 and publication of the final volume in 1971 meant the observatory's days were numbered. Other fundamental reasons also contributed to the notion that the observatory was no longer a viable proposition. The transfer of meteorology to the Commonwealth in 1908 removed the observatory's most high-profile public service, electric telegraphy and radio had reduced and in time eliminated the need for local navigational and time services. Ambient city light was starting to restrict astronomical observation though the place was still suitable for the time-consuming analysis of the observations and other astronomical work together with functions such as a public observatory and a centre for public and media enquiries.

Post World War II was an exciting time for Australian astronomical development, particularly in radio astronomy. These developments bypassed Sydney though the Government Astronomer Harley Wood kept a close involvement as the first president of the Astronomical Society of Australia (ASA) in 1966 and as the co-ordinator of the first International Astronomical Union (IAU) General Assembly to be held in the southern hemisphere in Sydney, 1973. Without major capital funds to develop its own specialisations in the west, Sydney remained tied to its traditional role. Despite this there was some positive activity at the observatory. During the 1950s and 1960s under Wood, the observatory enjoyed a modest renaissance. Staff numbers were built up and new equipment acquired. Both the Sydney and Melbourne sections of the Astrographic catalogue were completed and published. A new domed building was constructed in the south-east corner of the observatory to house the Melbourne star camera that replaced the original Sydney one. A new survey of the southern sky was commenced and by 1982 Wood's successor William Robertson had completed the photography and measurement was underway. Education was another aspect of the observatory's work that Wood developed. Always one of its aims, increasing numbers of visitors, including teaching students, attended the observatory.

These activities commanded respect for Sydney Observatory in astronomical circles, but its image in the NSW Parliament and associated Public Service remained forgettable. Wood's annual reports failed to help this. They did not communicate any sense of excitement and worth in the observatory.

==== Disestablishment as a functioning observatory ====
The disestablishment of the observatory echoed that of fifty years earlier when Cooke stressed the need for a new location. The chairman of the Board of Visitors wrote a letter to the Premier in 1979 urging the establishment of a remote observing site for the observatory and stressing the difficulty of the conditions at the existing site. This coincided with a nationwide review of astronomy facilities commissioned by the ASA and led by Monash University Professor of Astronomy Kevin Westfold (1980) This concluded that astronomy was a federal responsibility and that resources should be allocated to research operations, highlighting radio astronomy. The financial difficulties of the State of NSW at that time resulted in a letter from the Premier in June 1982 announcing his decision to transfer the observatory to the Museum of Applied Arts and Sciences and discontinue scientific work. Despite letters from international astronomers, and a concerted effort from now-retired Harley Wood, the Government did not rescind its decision.

In July 1984 the Minister for Public Works, Ports and Roads announced an $800,000 project to restore Sydney Observatory for astronomy education, public observatory and a Museum of Astronomy. While the importance of the exterior was recognised, the interior was less fortunate. Work inside the building in the creation of the museum involved the staged removal of almost all instruments, equipment, and furniture and furnishings to the Museum's store. The astrographic building was demolished and the dome, instruments and most of the glass plate and paper collection was removed to Macquarie University for future research use.

In 1997 the observatory was refurbished, this time instruments were returned to their original locations or showcased. 'The "By the light of the Southern Stars" exhibition theme also included the Parramatta Observatory instruments and Indigenous astronomy. In 1999 a major stonemasonry repair project on the observatory building commenced. This continued through to 2008. In 2002 the conservation plan was updated by Kerr, this time complimentary on the relocation and interpretation of the instruments.

A number of key astronomical events have occurred in recent years, most notable are Halley's Comet (1986), the impact of Shoemaker Levy on Jupiter (1994), Mars at its closest encounter (2003), transits of Venus (2004, 2012), Comet McNaught (2007), planetary alignments and eclipses. Thousands of people came to the observatory to view these through telescopes and to see relevant exhibitions. Further the observatory provided information about these events to many more people either directly or through the media.

In 2008, for the 150th anniversary, the Signal Station building was stabilised, one of the original two flagstaffs re-constructed and an archaeological investigation commenced around the base of the fort led by NSW Government Architects, building design and Heritage office and Casey and Lowe. Original fort footings were uncovered and the base of a room which was once a bombproof inside the fort wall foundations.

In 2009 permission was granted for a temporary marquee to be erected for a restricted period of time in order to raise funds. Furthermore, the Astrographic dome and instruments have been returned by Macquarie University to the Museum store where they are awaiting conservation and a Heritage NSW approved structure on the observatory site. The most significant change to Sydney Observatory in 50 years, the new Eastern Dome was opened on 27 January 2015, by the Deputy Premier Troy Grant and Minister for Disability Services, John Ajaka.

=== Georg Merz and Sons, vintage 7.25-inch refracting telescope ===
Located at the Sydney Observatory is a vintage 7.25-inch refracting telescope on an Equatorial mount that was manufactured by the German company Georg Merz and Sons between 1860 and 1861. The 7.25-inch Merz refracting telescope arrived at Sydney Observatory, Sydney, Australia, in 1861.

== Description ==
The observatory is a sandstone two-storey building in the Italianate style. There are two telescope domes on octagonal bases and a four-storey tower for the time-ball. The 1858 building designed by the Colonial Architect, Alexander Dawson, comprised a dome to house the equatorial telescope, a room with long, narrow windows for the transit telescope, an office for calculations, and a residence for the astronomer. A western wing was added in 1877 with office and library space and a second dome for another telescope. Some of the first astronomical photographs of the southern sky were taken at the observatory, under the direction of Henry Chamberlain Russell. The observatory also took part in the compilation of the first atlas of the whole sky, The astrographic catalogue. The part completed at Sydney took over 70 years, from 1899 to 1971, and filled 53 volumes. The observatory once contained offices, instruments, a library and an astronomer's residence. It is now a public observatory and a museum of astronomy and meteorology.

The building is of Florentine Renaissance style and the storeys are divided by string courses while articulated quoins at corners, stone bracketed eaves and entablatures to openings of the residence contribute to the fine stone masonry work. A single storey wing to the north has had a timber balcony verandah with a stone balustrade built above. Windows are of twelve pane type and the doors are six panels.

The physical condition is good.

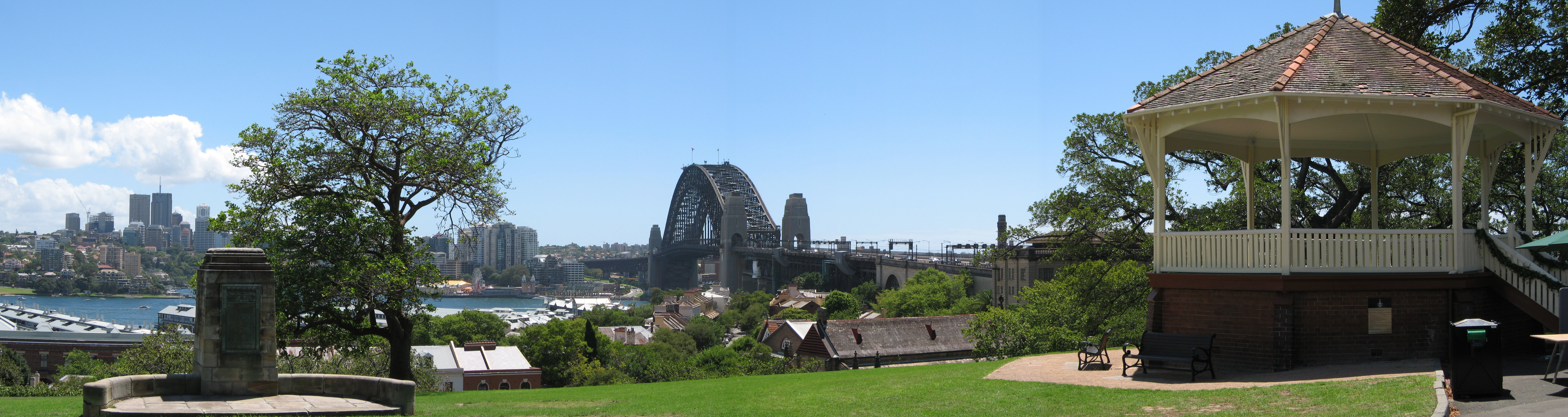
Observatory Hill affords superb views of Sydney Harbour and the bridge.

=== Modifications and dates ===
- 1796 – First windmill built on hill.
- 1796–97 – to crush grain - abandoned 1806.
- 1800 – At least two six-pounder cannons located on hill.
- 1804 – Commencement of construction of Fort Phillip as protection versus convict uprising. Site known as Citadel Hill. Building work continued until 1806, then abandoned, with the fort unfinished.
- 1808 – Flagstaffs erected on eastern side of Fort Phillip parapet.
- 1823 – Semaphore and flagstaff added to hill.
- 1838 – Dual purpose staff and telegraph masters hut noted on site.
- 1847 – Signal Station built – finished 1848.
- 1857 – Signal Station altered, and in 1859, took its present form by 1864.
- 1858 – Demolition of windmill tower and construction of Observatory - finished 1859.
- 1876–78 – West wing built. Other alterations to residence in 1907.
- c. 1907 – Most of the residence lath and plaster ceilings replaced by decorative pressed metal ceilings and matching cornices.
- 1907 – New staircase constructed in residence.
- 20th century – Most observatory ceilings replaced by asbestos cement sheeting. - Addition of picture rails.
- 1982 – Wran Government decision to cease scientific work on site, Powerhouse Museum takes responsibility for management
- 1984–87 – DPWS manage major works to provide a museum of astronomy, exhibitions etc.
- November 1987 – Signal Station use as by Museum agreed to by Minister for Public Works.
- 1980s – Observatory ceilings replaced with plaster-board; some floors replaced with particle board sheeting; some basement floors quarry tiled.
- 1985 – New staircase constructed in south west tower.
- 1987 – Garden re-landscaping/reinstatement to conform with Russell's plan of 1893, replanting with appropriate 19th century species (oleander, agaves, plumbago) by Royal Botanic Gardens Sydney staff.
- 1993 – Signal Station Messengers Cottage vacated and use as museum agreed in-principle by Treasurer in 11/1993.
- 1995 – Signal Station Messengers Cottage refurbished for use as offices by museum staff. All walls were plastered but have been progressively repaired and replaced over the years.
- 1997 – Many original instruments were conserved and restored to their former locations.
- 2008 – The Signal Station was restored and a replica flagstaff re-instated on the South rampart of the Fort wall for the Sydney Observatory 150th celebration.
- 2015 – Opened the East Dome which caters for people with disability. This won the National Trust's 2015 Heritage Award for Adaptive Reuse.

== Heritage listing ==
As at 20 October 2005, the observatory is of exceptional significance in terms of European culture. Its dominant location beside and above the port town and, later, City of Sydney made it the site for a range of changing uses, all of which were important to, and reflected, stages in the development of the colony. These uses included: milling (the first windmill); defence (the first, and still extant, fort fabric); communications (the flagstaffs, first semaphore and first electric telegraph connection); astronomy, meteorology and time keeping. The surviving structures, both above and below ground, are themselves physical documentary evidence of 195 years' changes of use, technical development and ways of living. As such they are a continuing resource for investigation and public interpretation.

The site is associated with a wide range of historical figures, many of whom played a role in shaping its development. These include colonial governors Hunter, Bligh, Macquarie and Denison; military officers and engineers such as Macarthur, Barrallier, Bellasis and Minchin; and convicts, including the still-unidentified individuals who built the mill and fort. Architects associated with the site include Greenway, who was also a convict, as well as Lewis, Blacket, Weaver, Dawson and Barnet. Other notable figures include signallers and telegraphists such as Jones and members of the Moffitt family, along with astronomers, particularly P. P. King, Scott, Smalley, Russell, Cooke and Wood. The site's elevated position offers views of the harbour and city, while mature Moreton Bay fig (Ficus macrophylla) trees in the surrounding park frame the landscape. These features make it a notable location in Sydney.

The Italianate character and stylistic interest of the observatory and residence building, together with the competence of the masonry (brick and stone) of all major structures on the site, combine to create a precinct of architectural quality; Finally, the continued use of the observatory for astronomical observations and the survival of astronomical instruments, equipment (Appendix 4) and some early furniture (Appendix 3), although temporarily dispersed, and the retention of most interior spaces, joinery, plasterwork, fireplaces, and supports ensure that the observatory can remain the most intact and longest serving early scientific building in the State. Also of significance for relationship of Commonwealth and State powers. Site of the first intercolonial conference on meteorology and astronomy. An example of a Colonial building erected for scientific purposes and continuing to perform its function at the present time. The structure makes an imposing composition atop the historic hill originally known as Flagstaff Hill and occupies the historic Fort Phillip site (1804–45). Designed by the colonial architect Alexander Dawson and built in 1858.

Sydney Observatory was listed on the New South Wales State Heritage Register on 22 December 2000.

== See also ==
- Australian non-residential architectural styles
- List of astronomical observatories
