= Wedderburn artistic community =

The Wedderburn artistic community is an informal group of Australian contemporary artists based around Wedderburn, New South Wales, on Sydney sandstone bushland about 60 kilometres south of Sydney, close to the Georges River. Artists based around Wedderburn include Elisabeth Cummings, Roy Jackson, John Peart, David Hawkes, Suzanne Archer, David Fairbairn, Michael Bright, Teresa Bell and others. Artists associated with the group have won many major Australian art prizes, including the Wynne Prize, the Sir John Sulman Prize, the Doug Moran National Portrait Prize, the Dobell Prize for Drawing, and the Fleurieu Art Prize.

== Widden Weddin, Wedderburn ==
The artistic community around Wedderburn was started in 1976, after the gift of 10 acres of land from local landowners Barbara and Nick Romalis, to an original group containing Elisabeth Cummings, Joan Brassil, Roy Jackson and Fred Braat. John Peart joined in the 1980s, with the extension of the site up to 25 acres. The property was jointly owned by these five artists, and came to be known as Widden Weddin (meaning 'I came, I stayed').

== Artistic approach ==
The Wedderburn artists often seek inspiration from the Australian bush landscape, and the artistic tradition associated with it, including from Indigenous Australian art. For instance, Roy Jackson said: "If someone asks me what has influenced me most in my work, I simply point to the landscape of this place". Elisabeth Cummings: "I’d been away from Australia – in Europe – and what I missed most was the bush… It’s a physical thing of Australia that's so… so different from Europe."

== Wildfires ==
The area is heavily wooded, and subject to bush fires, one of which destroyed Elisabeth Cummings' studio in 1994, also destroying significant amounts of work. During another fire in 2013, John Peart was overcome by smoke while trying to protect his studio, leading to his death.
