= Gemma Smith =

Australian artist, sculptor (born 1978)

Gemma Smith (born 1978) is an Australian painter and sculptor, who is Sydney-based. Smith has been the recipient of numerous grants and been invited to join multiple exhibitions. She is known for her continuous experimentations with colour and abstraction. Her work is held in museum, corporate and private collections across Australia.

== Early life and education ==
Gemma was born in Sydney and was based there until 2004. In 2004 she went to Brisbane where she stayed until 2012. In 2012 she went to Pittsburgh, Pennsylvania in the United States for 2 years. She lives and works in Sydney.

Smith completed a Bachelor of Visual Arts at Sydney College of the Arts in 1999 and in 2004 an honour's year at Queensland University of Technology in Brisbane.

== Work ==
Smith is a painter and a sculptor who works are abstract art. While the major modern movements of abstract art faded, Gemma sees abstract art as very alive, and pursues both geometric and organic forms of abstraction.

In her early work she painted crystal-like forms to explore shapes, position and brilliant colour. Gemma then went on to explore these shapes in three-dimensional sculpture. As her work evolved, her paintings began to move from shapes to bands of colour interwoven with free brush strokes, using colour and interweaving to create spatial incongruities.

Her early sculptures were made of airplane plywood and had hinges, so people could participate and fold the works and become engaged beyond just looking and looking away.

The simple planes of some of her more recent sculptures, folded metal in a single colour, recall the late works of Alexander Calder, as well as works by Anthony Caro and Ellsworth Kelly. She struggles with her paintings, and keeps only about 1 in 10, so she often paints over paintings. In her most recent paintings (2017+) she has used softer colours, often spreading them in layers to hide brushstrokes. She continually experiments.

Smith has also executed commissioned public artworks including Ceiling Artwork at the Supreme Court and District Court, Brisbane (2011–2012) and Synchro, Adaptable (Red Oxide/Peach) at Brisbane Airport (2010). In 2018 Gemma completed Triple Tangle, a mural of loops of colour commissioned by the Museum of Contemporary Art, Sydney, for their foyer wall going up the entry stairs. Her approach of continual experimentation is shown in her statement about Triple Tangle:

"I essentially made the painting three times. Initially, I painted my lines ten centimeters thick and it didn’t work in the space – they were too spindly – and then I remade the entire work at twelve centimeters – they weren’t weighty enough – and then I did it again at thirteen centimeters, and it was just right."

== Awards ==
- 2024 Mosman Art Prize for Pollen Prism a synthetic polymer paint on linen.

== Collections ==
Her work is held in the National Gallery of Australia, the Museum of Contemporary Art Australia, the Art Gallery of South Australia, and the Art Gallery of New South Wales

== Exhibitions ==
In 2009, Smith held a solo exhibition at the Gertrude Contemporary Art Spaces in Melbourne. In 2011 Smith was the Artist in Residence at the Turner Galleries in Perth where she had a solo exhibition. In 2019 the School of Art & Design at UNSW held a survey exhibition of Smith's work entitled "Rhythm Sequence".
