= Wedderburn, New South Wales =

Wedderburn
- Suburb
- Interactive map of Wedderburn
- Coordinates: 34°7′34″S 150°49′4″E
- Country: Australia
- State: New South Wales
- City: Sydney
- LGA: City of Campbelltown
- Location: 57 km (35 mi) south-west of Sydney CBD; 18 km (11 mi) north of Appin; 53 km (33 mi) north of Wollongong
- Established: 1896

Government
  - State electorate: Campbelltown
  - Federal division: Macarthur
- Elevation: 250 m (820 ft)

Population
  - Total: 665 (2021 census)
- Postcode: 2560
Suburbs around Wedderburn
St Helens Park	Holsworthy	Holsworthy
Gilead	Wedderburn	Woronora Dam
Appin	Appin	Woronora Dam

Wedderburn is a suburb of Sydney, in the state of New South Wales, Australia. Wedderburn is located 57 kilometres south-west of the Sydney central business district in the local government area of the City of Campbelltown and is part of the Macarthur region.

Wedderburn is the only Campbelltown suburb on the right bank of the Georges River. A steep gorge and heavy bush gives Wedderburn the atmosphere of a small country town rather than the suburban norm. The causeway on Wedderburn Road, which provides the main link to Campbelltown, is known to flood during heavy rain, increasing Wedderburn's isolation.

A small airport, Wedderburn Airport, operated by the New South Wales Sports Aircraft Club, is located to the south of the suburb.

== History ==
Wedderburn was originally home to the Tharawal people and settlers from European backgrounds did not come to the area until the 1880s. In clearing the land, they established orchards which are still used today. The first Wedderburn Bridge was built in 1892 and a school and post office were established in 1896. Electricity did not reach Wedderburn until 1952. Increasing environmental awareness has seen Campbelltown Council keen to protect the gorges around Wedderburn and O'Hare's Creek Gorge to the east is set to become a national park.

== Notable residents ==
- Gracius Joseph Broinowski (1837–1913), a Polish-born artist and ornithologist who published a six-volume book on the birds of Australia.
- Kevin O'Keefe OAM and Julie O'Keefe, entrepreneurs and philanthropists.
- Dr Ross Field
- Dr Lakshman Prasad, prominent medical practitioner in Campbelltown and philanthropist
- Kath Robinson, senior lecturer at The University of Sydney
- David Fairbairn (artist) (1949– ), artist and winner of the Dobell Drawing prize 1999 and the Doug Moran National Portrait Prize in 2002.

Artists from the Widden Weddin group:

- John Peart (1946–2013), artist and winner of the Wynne Prize in 1997 and the Sulman Prize in 2000.
- Elisabeth Cummings (1934–), prominent artist.
