= Observatory Park, Sydney =

Park in New South Wales, Australia

Observatory Park
- Observatory Hill; Sydney Observatory
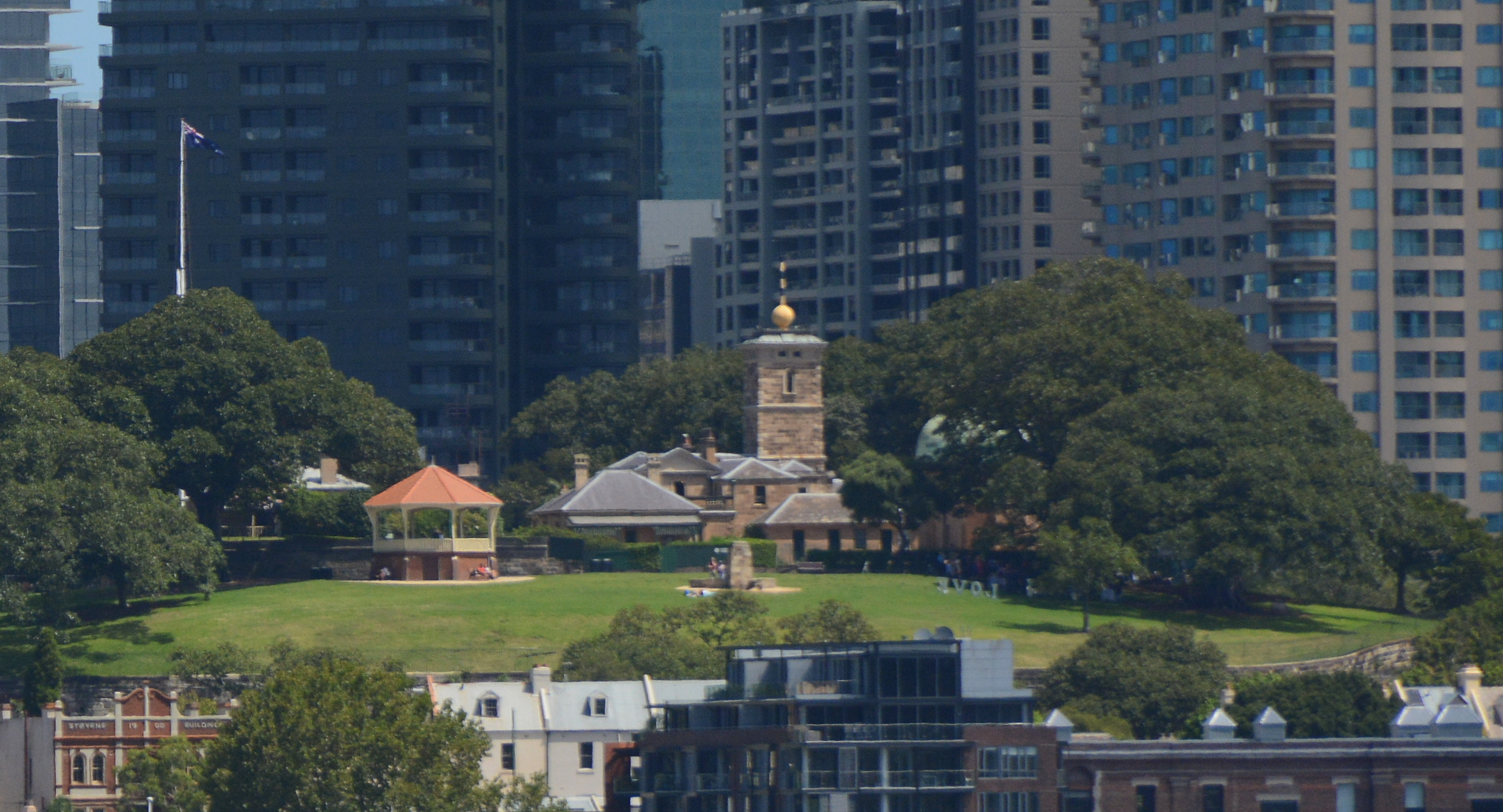
- Observatory Park, Sydney

- Location within Sydney
- Location: Kent Street, Watson Road, Upper Fort Street and Bradfield Highway, Millers Point
- Nearest city: Sydney, New South Wales, Australia
- Coordinates: 33°51′34″S 151°12′17″E
- Owner: City of Sydney and National Trust of Australia
- Open: 24 hours
- Status: Open all year
- Public transit: Sydney Trains: Wynyard; Circular Quay
- Facilities: Rotunda, ample grassed area with views across Sydney Harbour Bridge, outdoor gymnasium, Sydney Observatory, the Signal Station, the remains of Fort Philip

Observatory Park is a park located in the heart of the Sydney central business district, City of Sydney, New South Wales, Australia. It is near the Harbour Bridge and is bounded by Kent Street, Watson Road, Upper Fort Street and Bradfield Highway, Millers Point. Its history dates back to 1796 when it was used as the site of the first windmill in the colony, when it was known as Windmill Hill. It is also the site of a number of historical buildings including the historic Sydney Observatory (thus often referred to as Observatory Hill), the Signal Station, the remains of Fort Philip, the National Trust Centre (formerly Fort Street High School) and a rotunda which is used for weddings.

== Overview ==
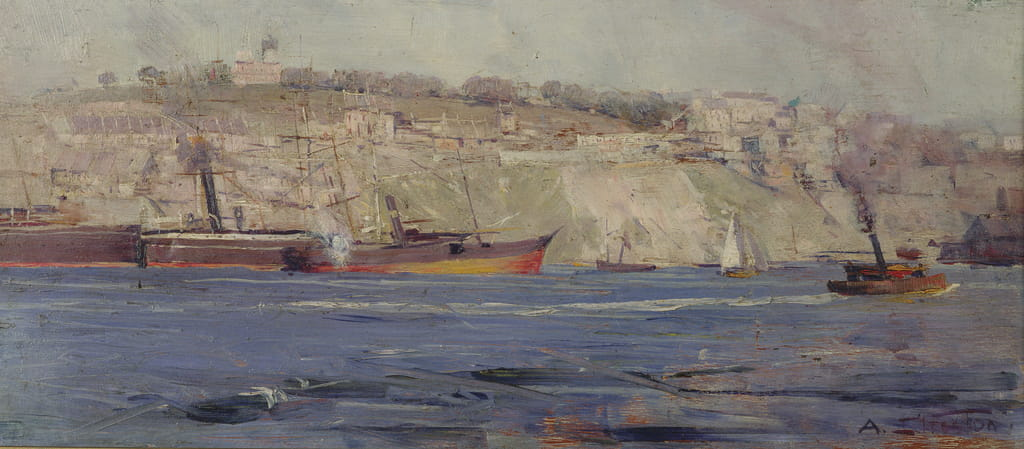
Painting of Observatory Hill by Arthur Streeton in 1896

A windmill was constructed on the site in 1796 by John Davis, an Irish convict. It was a stone tower used to grind wheat. It subsided a few years later and was replaced by another windmill to the south. These structures gave rise to the name Windmill Hill for this area. In 1804 Fort Philip was built on the Hill. It was supplied with four 6-pounder cannons and a gunpowder magazine. The powder magazine was moved to Goat Island in 1833, and Fort Philip was partially demolished in the 1850s. A signal station was built on the eastern rampart of Fort Philip in 1847 which was for many years called the Fort Philip Signal Station. This is now open to the public.

In 1858 Sydney Observatory was built near the signal station. For over a Century it played an essential role in shipping, navigation, meteorology and timekeeping and astronomy. Today the building is used as museum and public observatory.

The National Trust Centre which is near the Park was once a military hospital. It was built as a hospital in 1825 but closed in 1848 and became the Fort Street Model School. Although Fort Street School still exists on Observatory Hill the historic military hospital is now the headquarters of the National Trust and several rooms are available to hire as a venue.

There is a Rotunda in the park which dates back to 1912. It has a views of Sydney Harbour and is sometimes used as venue for weddings.

== Fort Philip ==
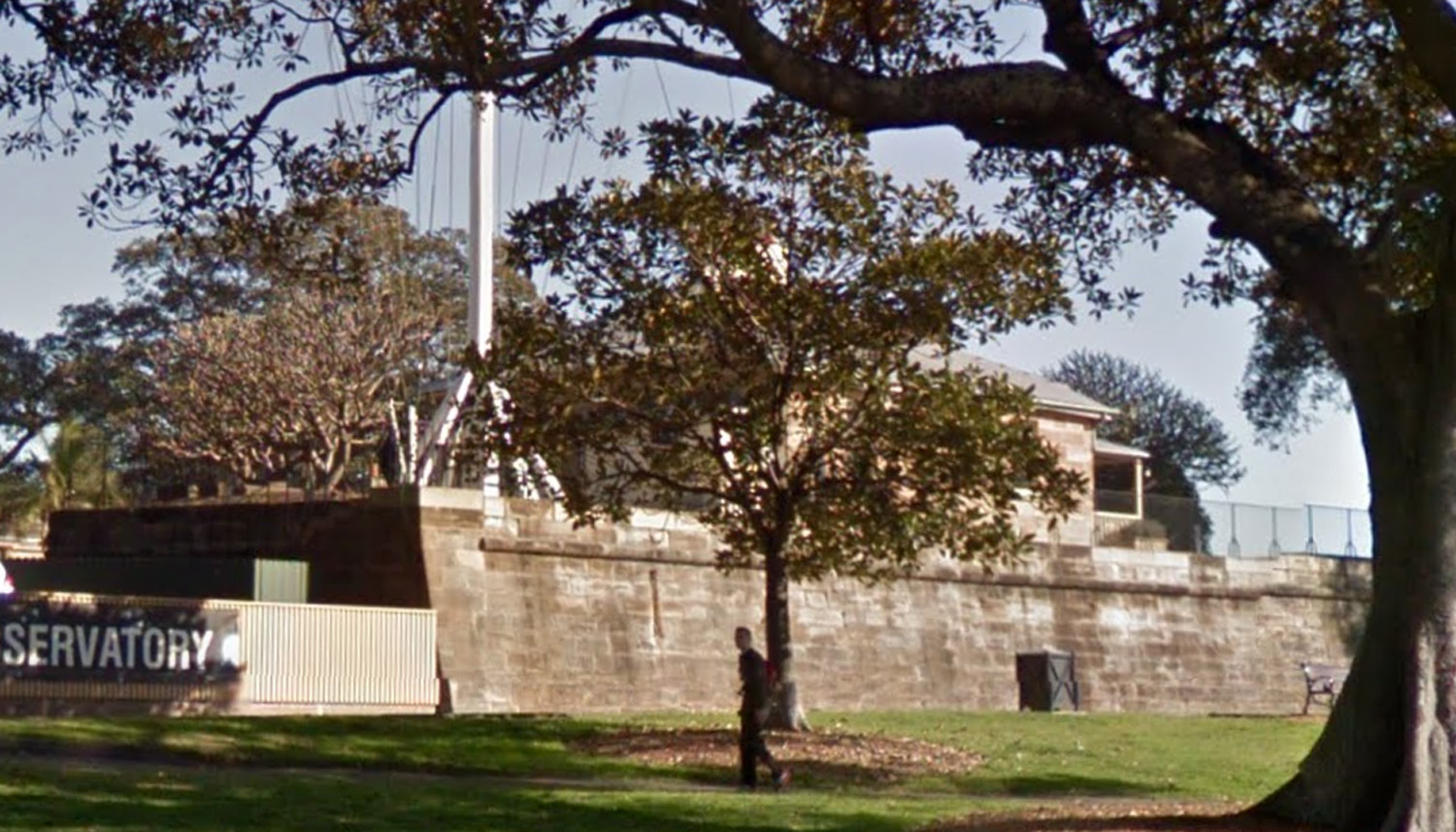
Remains of Fort Phillip today

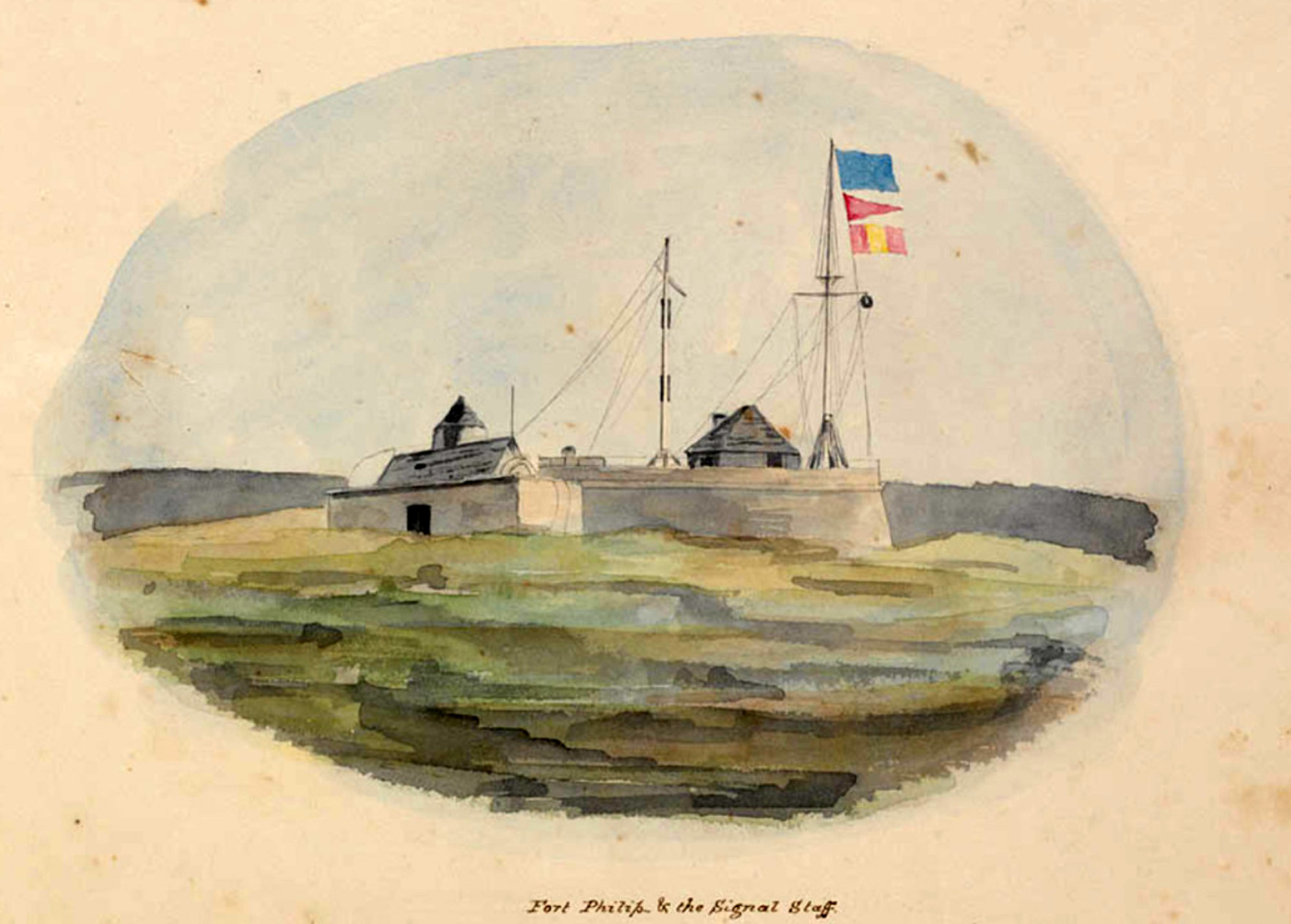
Fort Philip in 1842

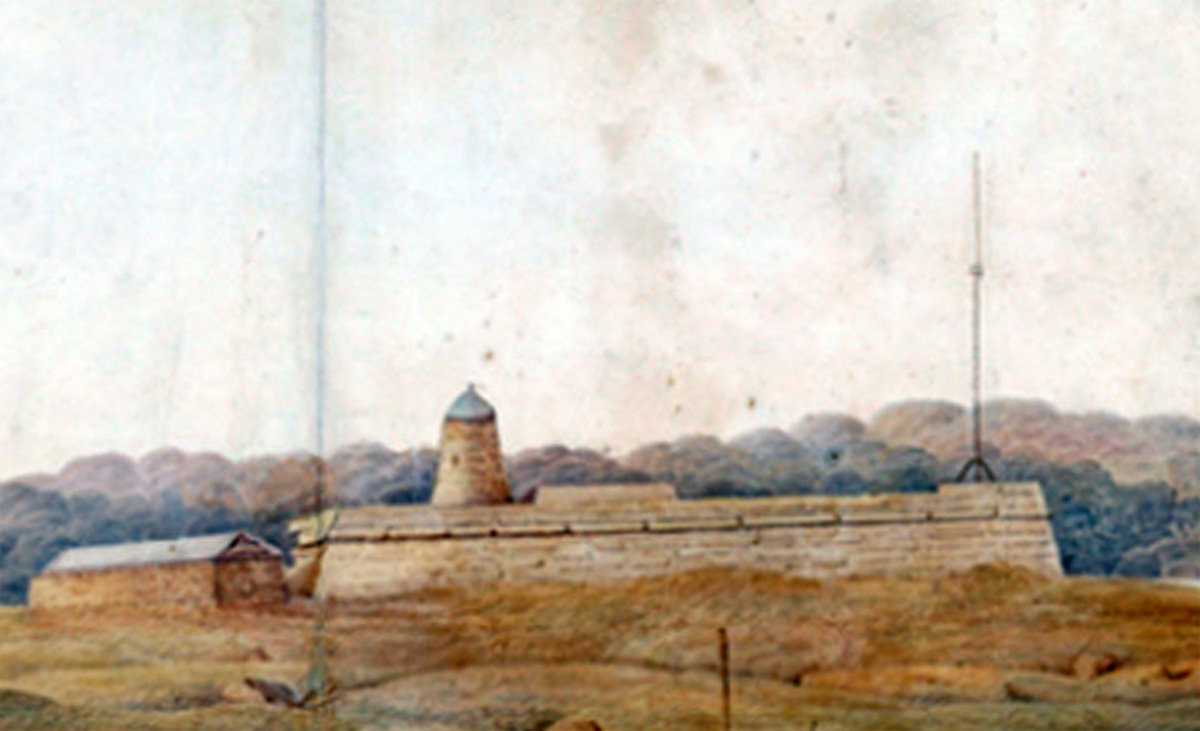
Fort Philip In 1820

The remains of Fort Philip are still on Observatory Hill. They appear as the wall at the front and side of the signal station and are shown in the photo to the right. They are the eastern rampart of the Fort which was used as the foundations for the signal station when it was built in 1848. The chains on the wall which are still visible were used to limit the amount of recoil of the canons used in the Fort

The construction of Fort Philip was commenced in 1804 by Governor King but it was never fully completed. It was built around the first windmill which can be seen in the painting of 1820. The tower of the ruined windmill was used for storage or accommodation for many years. It was intended that the Fort was to be hexagonal but only three sides were substantially completed. Construction ceased in 1806 and at this stage a report on the progress was given by the Colonial Secretary William Minchin. He said

"The ramparts, merlons (which were later dismantled) and embrasures of the three sides are nearly finished; the outer wall of the rampart of the fourth and fifth sides raised five feet; a bomb proof chamber of 14 feet square completed under one side and the foundation of the sixth side nearly laid."

The Fort was originally intended to suppress a possible insurrection by the Irish rebels who had been transported to Australia after the 1798 Rebellion in Ireland. The insurrection did not eventuate and the site was gradually used for other purposes.

In 1815 Francis Greenway built a powder magazine next to the Fort which is shown in both of the watercolours. It was a rectangular structure which contained a 4-foot thick arched stone vault. However it too was not fully completed and the proposed stone roof was not built. Instead it had a temporary roof which subsequently became permanent and no further work was undertaken.

== Signal Station ==
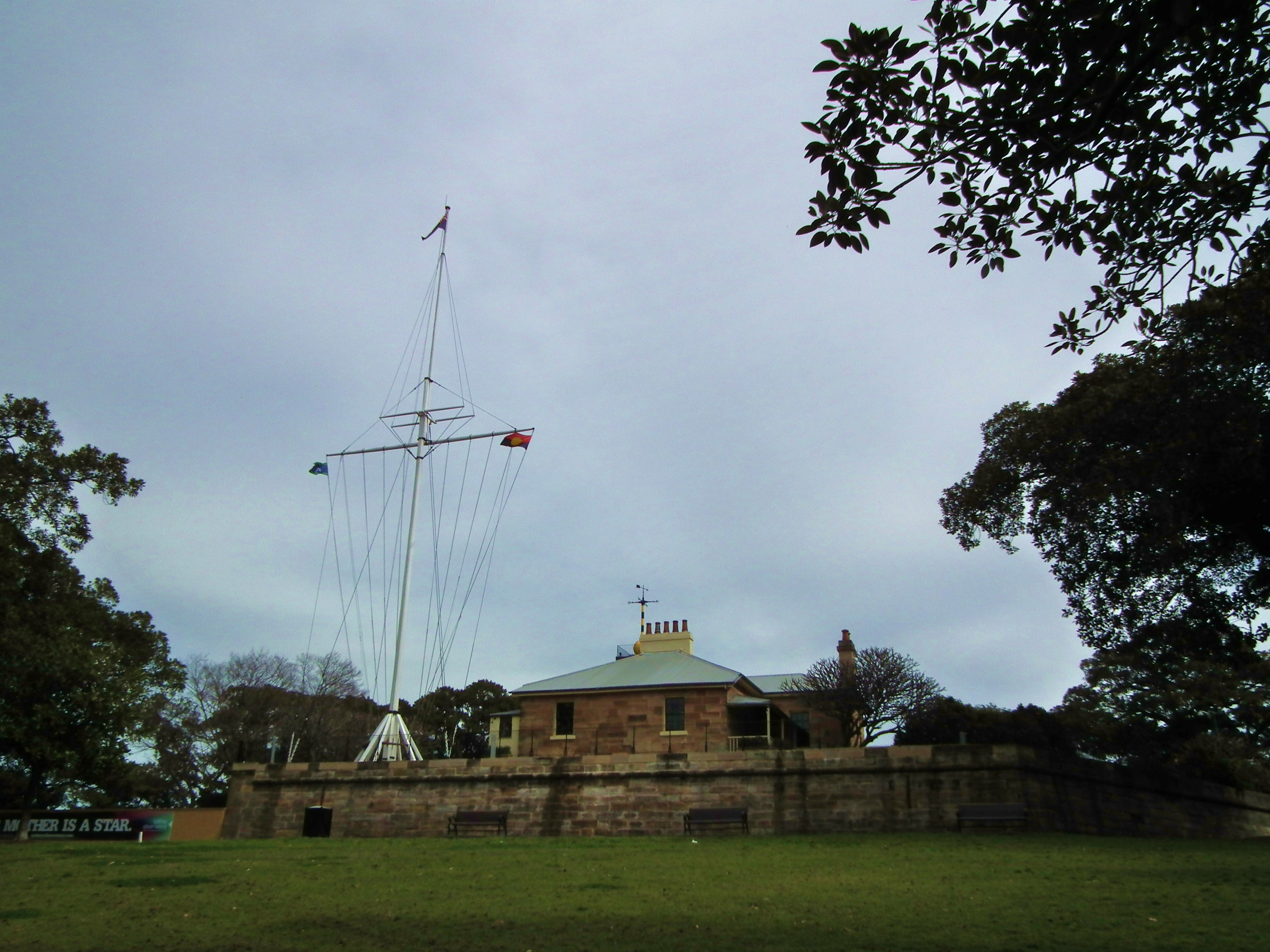
Signal Station on Observatory Hill

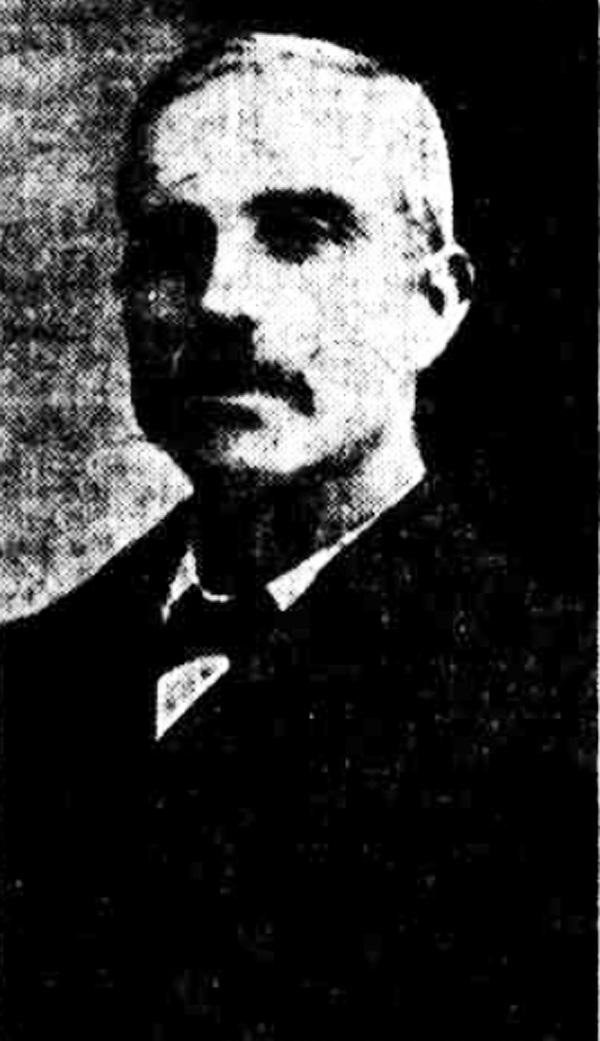
Jeremiah McCarthy, Signal Master from 1902 until 1920

In 1808 a flagstaff was erected on Fort Phillip and by 1823 a semaphore had been placed there. A hut for the signalman was also built at this time which can be seen in the watercolour of 1842. The semaphore had two swinging arms which could be changed to various positions that spelled out numbers. These could be translated into letters by referring to a code book. The first hut for the signal station was very small consisting of only four rooms, two of which were bedrooms. This was replaced in 1847 by the more substantial stone building designed by architect Mortimer Lewis which exists today. This building was the home of successive signal masters and their families until 1939 when the station was closed.

In 1912 The Sun newspaper interviewed the resident signal master Jeremiah McCarthy and the article provides a colourful insight into the daily activities of the station. It explains how the flags are displayed on the pole to convey information. It stated:

"Two little rooms about 10 feet by 10 feet are all the indoor accommodation of the building that is required to carry on operations. One room constitutes the telegraph and telephone room and general office while the other is used as a flag locker for there are scores and scores of brightly coloured squares and triangles of bunting used in the signalling work, each one neatly rolled up and stowed away in its proper place ready for immediate use.

The signals are made in what seamen call “hoists” As a vessel is sighted the flag of the company to which she belongs is sent up to the yardarm while to the signal staffhead is hoisted a square flag indicating whether she is a steamer or a sailing ship and two triangular ones which denote her last port of call fly immediately underneath. Thus for a P. and O. liner the company’s flag would be seen at the yardarm while up aloft would go a square chess board flag of blue and yellow indicating she was a steamer and the two triangular flags of different colours denoting her last port of call."

Jeremiah McCarthy had been appointed to the post of signal master in 1902 and he remained in this position until his death in 1920. Like many signal masters he had previous experience in the navy. He had also been a light house keeper on South Solitary Island and Smoky Cape for several years before this appointment. He had only one daughter who lived with him and his wife in the cottage until she married.

== Observatory ==
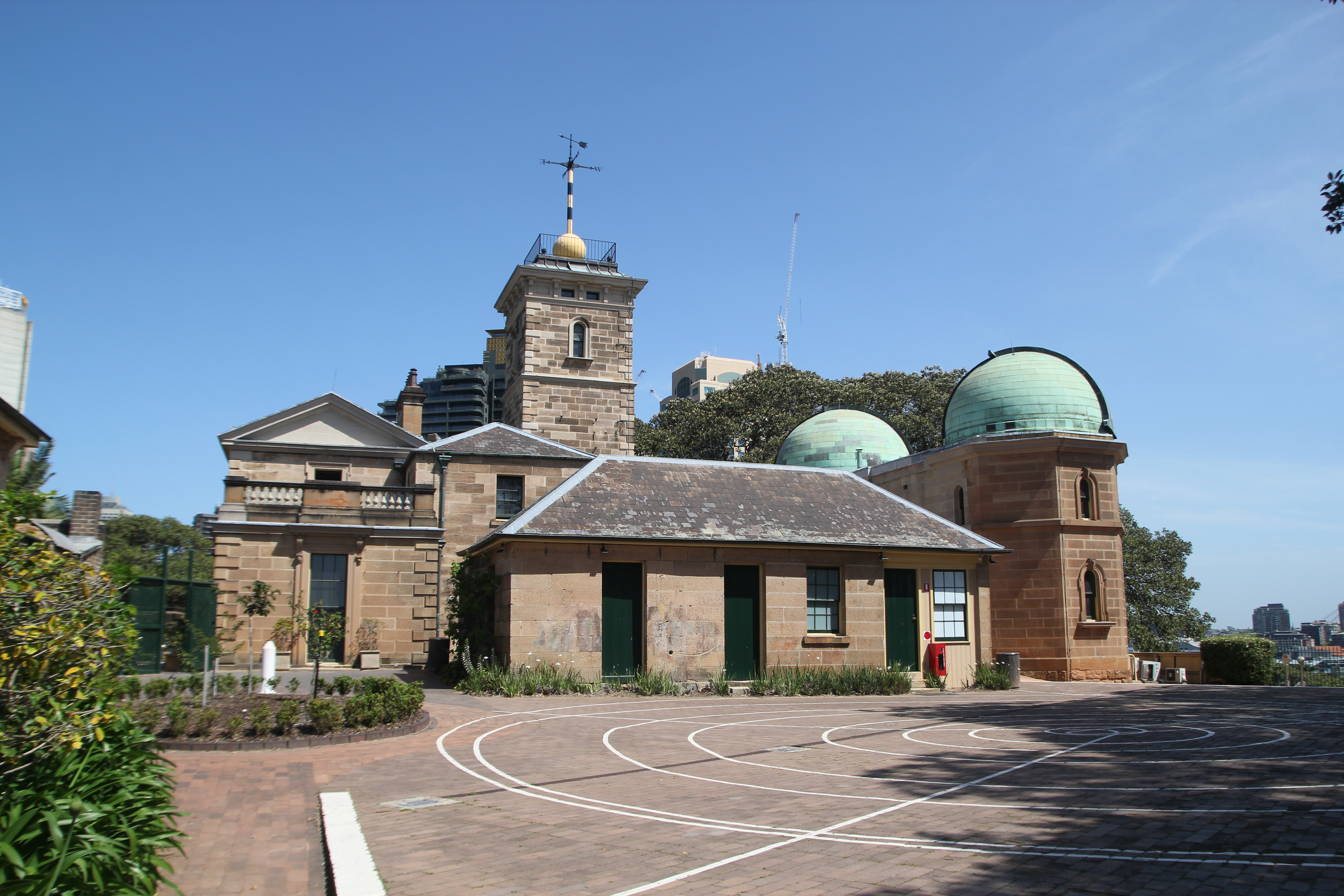
Sydney Observatory

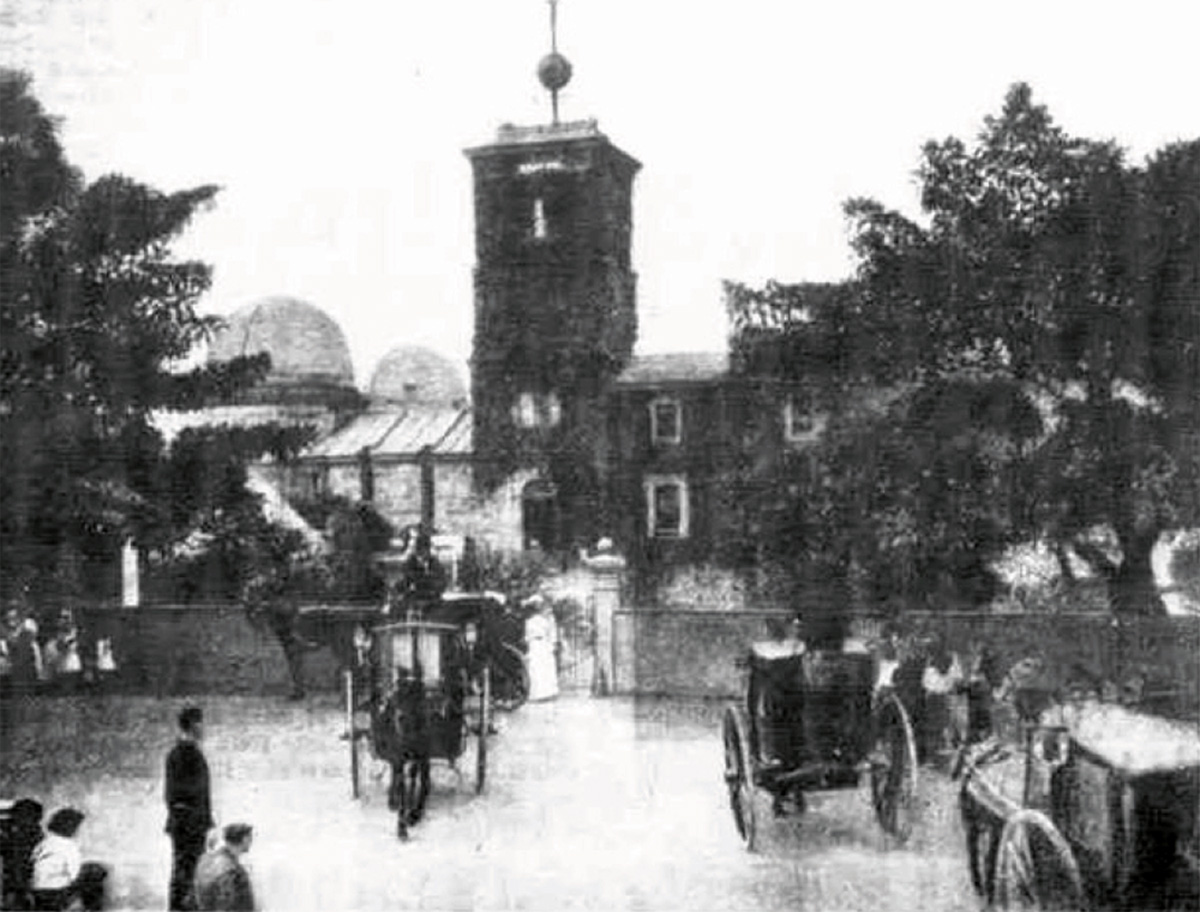
Sydney Observatory in 1902

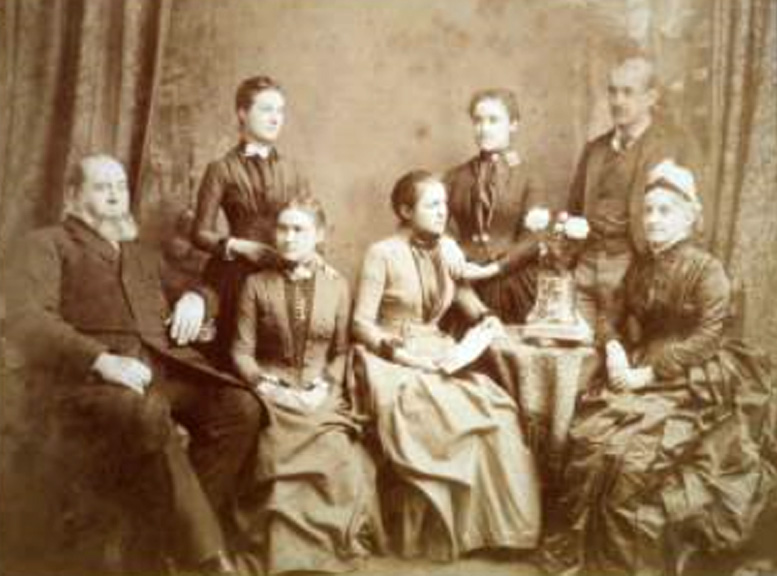
Henry Chamberlain Russell and his family in 1887

Sydney Observatory was built between 1857 and 1859. It was designed by Alexander Dawson, the Colonial Architect. It combines two types of architectural style – Italian High Renaissance Palazzo and the Italian Villa. A west wing was added to the building in 1876.

The site of the building was chosen because it was clearly visible from the harbour. It was originally intended that it was to only provide a time service through the operation of the Time Ball which still functions today. The Ball was dropped at 1p.m. and at the same time a cannon was fired at Dawes Point and then in later years at Fort Denison. The purpose of the Time Ball was so that ships could readjust their chronometers after being at sea for extended periods.

The Powerhouse Museum explains how the Time Ball works in the following terms:

"The Time Ball consists of a cast iron cylinder, piston, rack and pinion lifting mechanism, safety lock, electric motor and ball. The cylinder is 30cm diameter and 3 m long. Approximately 7 litres of soapy water fills the bottom of the cylinder to act as a buffer for the piston. The piston is a 10cm thick block of rubber with a bleeder valve to adjust the rate of descent. The rack extends from the piston to the Time Ball and is 7.5 meters long. A pinion engages into the rack by a slide gear, which enables the electric motor to raise the rack. A large hand wheel is also attached with a pawl gear to prevent back-slipping. The Time Ball is attached to the top of the rack and is raised 2.7 metres.

"At 6 minutes to 1PM the pinion is engaged into the rack and the electric motor switched on. It takes approx 2 minutes and 50 seconds to raise the ball to the top of the mast. The safety lock is then engaged and the pinion is disengaged. At precisely 1PM a signal from the atomic clock disengages the safety lock, causing the Time Ball to drop. It drops approximately 2 metres immediately and the back pressure in the cylinder causes it to drop the remaining distance at a slower rate."

The longest serving Government Astronomer to occupy the Observatory was Henry Chamberlain Russell who held this position from 1870 until his death in 1907. Russell reorganized the observatory for systematic work on star positions and observations of double stars and star clusters. He had a close association with the University of Sydney. He was a fellow of the Senate of the University in 1875–1907 and vice-chancellor in 1891–92.

In 1921 The Sydney Mail published a detailed article on the work being done at the observatory at this time.

== Rotunda ==
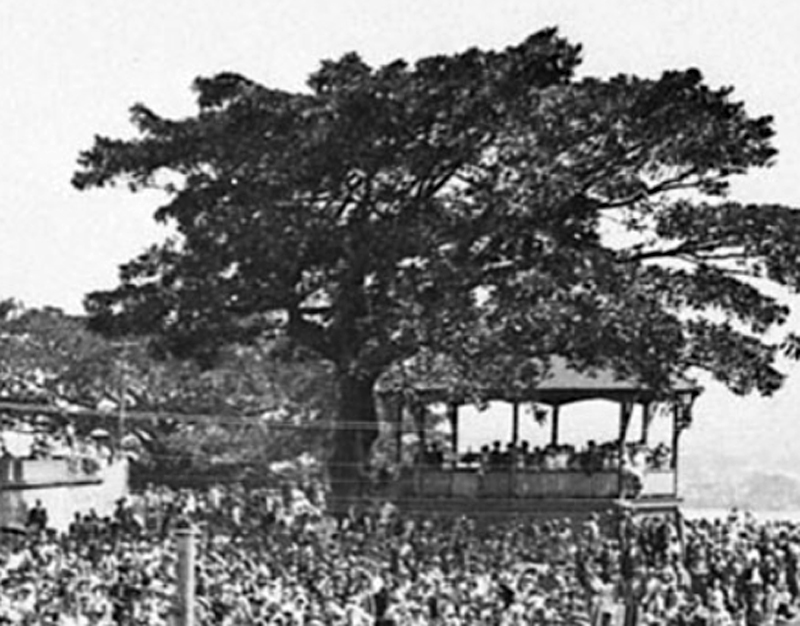
The Rotunda in 1932 at the opening of Sydney Harbour Bridge

The Rotunda was built in 1912. The Metropolitan Band played regularly in the building particularly on Sunday afternoons and evenings. John Palmer was the conductor at this time. He played classical music and also selections from Gilbert and Sullivan. The City of Sydney Band were also frequent entertainers in the Park.

Today the Rotunda is sometimes used as a venue for weddings. It has views over the harbour and has surrounding parkland.

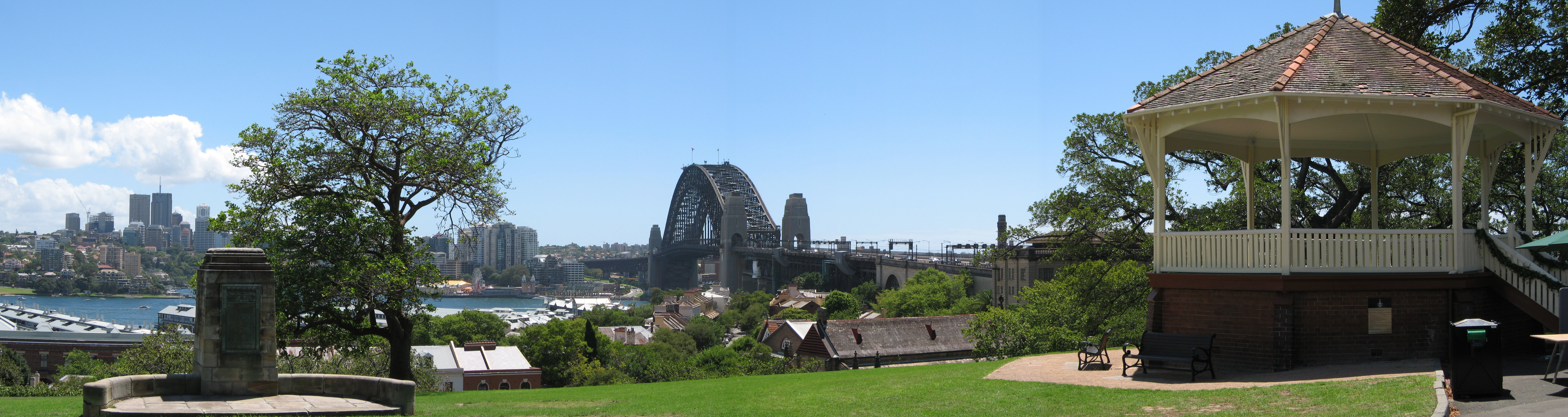
View from the Rotunda in Observatory Park

== Boer War Memorial ==
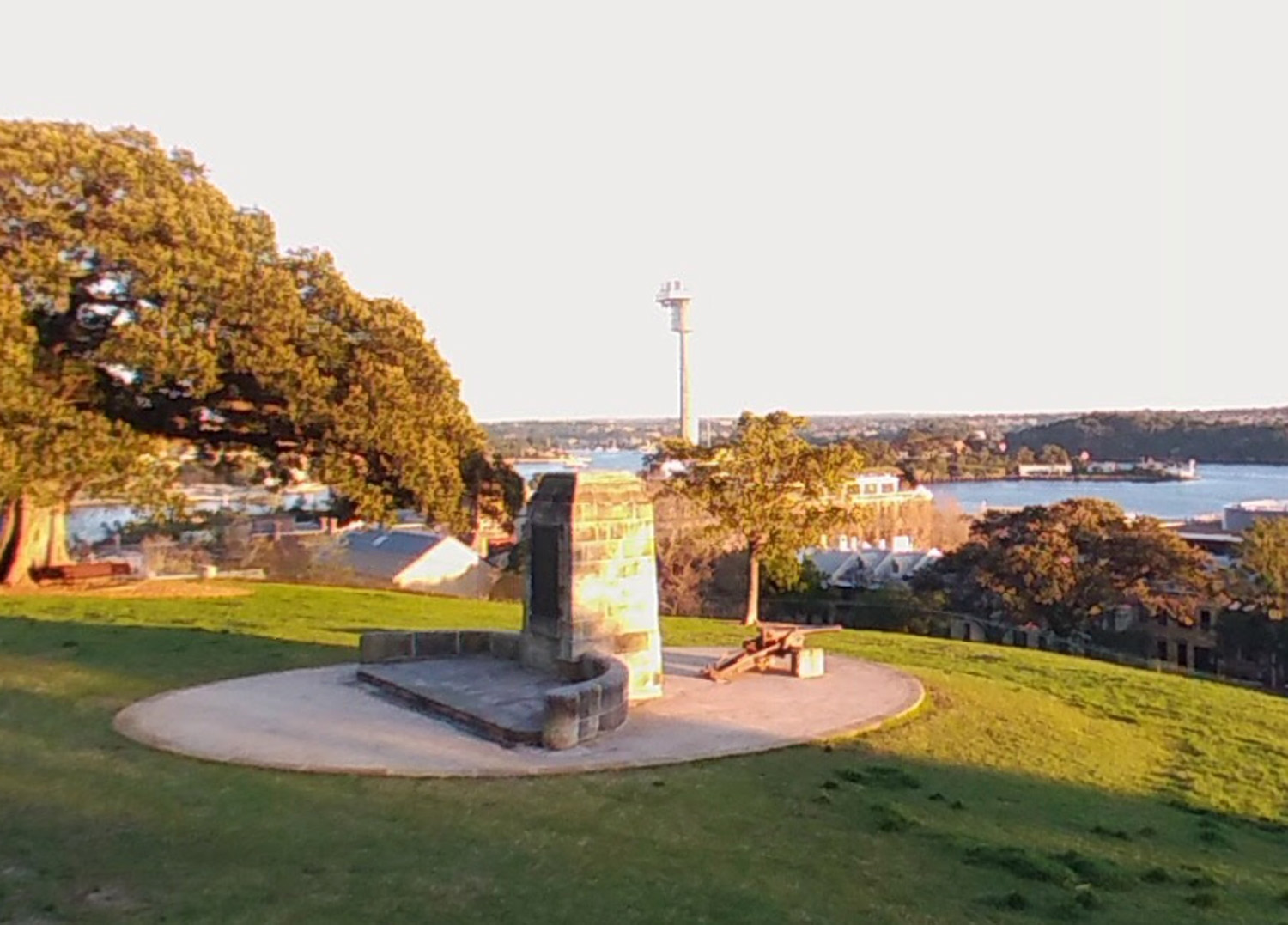
The Boer War Memorial and Boer gun

The Boer War Memorial was built in 1940. The stones in the structure are over 200 years old as they came from a building at Circular Quay built in the time of Governor Macquarie.

The unveiling was conducted by Major General Sir Charles Cox who at that time was 77 years old and needed to lean on a friend’s arm. However at the time of the Boer War in 1899 he was a young Officer who led the New South Wales Mounted Rifles. His name is on the memorial and his picture is shown. The gun near the structure was captured from the Boers by the British at the time of the war and given to the Australian Government in 1905. It is a 75 mm QF (Schnellfeuer-Feldkanone L/24) and was originally in the Botanic Gardens but the Veterans of the War requested that it be moved to their Memorial.
