= Fleurieu Biennale Art Prize =

Art prize from South Australia

- Description: Non-acquisitive landscape and thematic art prize
- Location: McLaren Vale and Goolwa, South Australia, South Australia
- Country: Australia
- Status: Active

The Fleurieu Biennale Art Prize, formerly the Fleurieu Art Prize, is an Australian art award, named for the Fleurieu Peninsula in South Australia.

== Origins and history ==
The Fleurieu Art Prize was established in 1998 in South Australia. Named after the Fleurieu Peninsula, the first exhibitions were held in the venues surrounding this area and supported by local businesses. Founders of the Prize include artist David Dridan, vigneron Greg Trott, and businessman Tony Parkinson.

The 2016 Fleurieu Art Prize exhibition was hosted by the Anne & Gordon Samstag Museum of Art in Adelaide, while the Fleurieu Food + Wine Art Prize took place as a community-run festival exhibition in McLaren Vale. The latter's award requirements stipulated "any paintings with a food and wine theme", and were eligible for a non-acquisitive prize of A$10,000 and consequent exposure during the community exhibition.

In 2018 the prize returned to the Fleurieu Peninsula.

In 2020 the Fleurieu Art Prize made plans to celebrate its 21st Anniversary with the theme "Of the Earth" and two non-acquisitive prizes of $20,000. However, due to COVID-19 pandemic restrictions on the number of people able to enter the gallery at a time, the significant financial strain on artists, and local supporting businesses, the Fleurieu Biennale organisation decided to cancel the 2020 and 2022 Prizes.

In June-July 2024 the Fleurieu Biennale Art Prize was at the Fleurieu Arthouse in McLaren Vale. There were three prizes: The Fleurieu Art Prize A$20,000; Emerging Artists Prize A$5,000; and a People's Choice award of A$2,000.

In 2026 the Curator's Choice Exhibition was launched, to provide more opportunity to more artists to exhibit and sell their works. The theme for the prize this year was "A Sense of Place". The Fleurieu Art Prize of A$20,000 and the Emerging Artists prize of A$5,000 were awarded by Fleurieu Biennale judges, while the Hardys Peoples' Choice Award of A$2,500 was awarded at the ende of the exhibition based on popular vote by exhibition attendees. There was also Curator's Choice prize of A$2,000, chosen by the curator and patron. Winners were announced on 5 June 2026 at the Fleurieu Arthouse.

The prize has had a few name changes over the years, as of 2026 being called simply the Fleurieu Biennale Art Prize, or simply Fleurieu Biennale.

== Description ==
The Fleurieu Biennale Art Prize is a non-acquisitive award open to Australian visual artists aged 18 years and older. The prize encompasses any two- or three-dimensional artwork submissions that follow an annual thematic concept and includes a monetary gift and significant exposure for the artists and their works. Exhibitions for the prize are held in various South Australian locations, including McLaren Vale and Goolwa. The exhibitions are open to the public at places including Stump Hill Gallery, the Fleurieu Visitors Information Centre, the Fleurieu Art House and Hardy's Tintara Sculpture Park.

As of 2026, Tony Parkinson is patron of the award, while patron emeritus is David Dridan OAM.

The central themes imposed on the artworks relate to the Australian lifestyle, landscapes, and customs.

The Fleurieu Art Prize has grown in prestige and cultural value over the years, bringing significant financial value to the local McLaren Vale area and South Australia as a whole. The popularity of the Fleurieu Art Prize reaps economic and cultural benefits for both artists and the community. The winning artists are awarded non-acquisitive financial prizes, and time to exhibit their work in local galleries. The prize attracts local news and social media coverage, promoting tourism for South Australia.

== Winners ==
=== List ===
Winners for the Fleurieu Art Prize include:

- 1998 – Robert Hannaford
- 2000 – Elisabeth Cummings
- 2002 – Joe Furlonger
- 2004 – Ian Grant
- 2006 – Ken Whisson
- 2008 – Tim Burns
- 2011 – Julie Harris
- 2013 – Fiona Lowry
- 2016 – Tony Albert
  - Fran Callen received the Fleurieu Food + Wine Art Prize for her painting Tabletop 1.
- 2018 – James Tylor and Laura Wills
- 2024 – Ashelee Hopkins
- 2026 –

=== 2016: Tony Albert ===
Tony Albert, a Queensland-originating but Sydney-located artist, won the 2016 Fleurieu Art Prize for his wall installation The Hand You're Dealt. His installation marks the first to receive the award after the prize organisers decided to extend restrictions on art forms from paintings to other mediums. Albert's piece consists of hundreds of small sculptures made from playing cards and "kitsch souvenirs" embellished with deliberate images and symbols of Aboriginal culture. Tony Albert won a A$65,000 prize for his work, making him the winner of the richest landscape prize in the world in 2016.

=== 2018: James Tylor & Laura Wills ===
Celebrating the 20th Anniversary of the Fleurieu Biennale Art Prize, James Tylor and Laura Willis won a A$25,000 award for their collaborative work Hidden Landscapes: Kangaroo Island. The piece is a hyper-realistic drawing on photographic paper and is notably the only winning artwork where the creative responsibility was shared between two artists.

The work was showcased at Stump Hill Gallery and also featured at the Fleurieu Arthouse in McLaren Vale and Signal Point Gallery in Goolwa.
