= John Peart (artist) =

John Peart (10 December 1945 – 1 October 2013) was an Australian contemporary artist. Peart won the Wynne Prize in 1997, the Sulman Prize in 2000, and was twice a finalist for the Archibald Portrait Prize.

== Early life and education ==
John Peart was born on 10 December 1945 in Brisbane, Queensland.

His only formal art education was at Brisbane Technical College in 1962, after which, while still a teenager in 1963, he went to Sydney to pursue his career as an artist.

== Career ==
In 1965 he met Frank Watters in Sydney, who had recently opened the Watters Gallery. Peart's first exhibition was at the gallery which continued to show his work throughout his career.

=== Participation in The Field ===
In 1968 he participated in the influential exhibition The Field at the National Gallery of Victoria in Melbourne, which was linked to the colour field expressionism movement. In the same year he won a series of major prizes, which gave him the funds to travel, and then subsequently to move to Wiltshire, in England, where he lived with his family for some years.

Soon after this exhibition, he dramatically shifted away from his early painting style, characterised by "rich colour and bold geometry", towards monochromatic, minimalist designs. Having made his name in such a big way had given good publicity to the Watters Gallery, and it continued to support him when he announced that he wanted to change his style completely, even though art investors were disdainful of his change of direction.

=== Widden Wedden, Wedderburn ===
In the 1980s, he moved to Widden Weddin, Wedderburn, an informal group of artists based on a 25-acre (10 ha) property approximately 60 km (37 mi) south of Sydney. This was part of a shift towards a specifically Australian style of art – he later said "I realised that painting was not developing along a linear path dictated entirely by New York, then I got busy rediscovering Australia".

== Teaching ==
Peart taught painting at the National Art School in Sydney from 1978 to 1986, and again from 1993 to 2002.

== Artistic philosophy ==
Peart was interested in Eastern philosophy. The sculptor Paul Selwood said of him, "Peart's life is a spiritual quest; painting is a process of 'becoming' through aesthetic perception", and his friend Roy Jackson used a Taoist quote to describe his artistic philosophy - "The method that consists in no method is the perfect method."

== Awards ==
- 1997: winner, Wynne Prize
- 1998: finalist, Archibald Prize, with a portrait of ceramicist and author Margaret Tuckson (spouse of Tony Tuckson)
- 1999: finalist, Archibald Prize, with a portrait of colleague and friend, artist Elizabeth Cummings
- 2000: winner, Sulman Prize

== Death and legacy ==
Peart died in Wedderburn on 1 October 2013, after being overcome by smoke when he went out during the night to check on bushfires burning on the Wedderburn property.
