= David Fairbairn (artist) =

Australian painter and printmaker

David Fairbairn (born 1949), is an Australian painter and printmaker who was the winner of the Dobell Prize for Drawing in 1999. He has been selected as a Dobell Prize Finalist fifteen times, won the Doug Moran National Portrait Prize in 2002 and has been exhibited in the Archibald Prize eight times. Fairbairn teaches at the National Art School, Sydney.

== Personal life ==
David Fairbairn was born in Zambia, Africa in 1949. Following his schooling he did an honours degree in Fine Art then earned a postgraduate scholarship to Royal Academy School of Art, London, attending from 1974 to 1977. He moved to Australia in 1979. He lives in Wedderburn, a small town on the Georges River south of Sydney, with his wife, the artist and Dobell Prize winner, Suzanne Archer, who is featured in much of his work.

== Career ==
After a legal dispute between the Tweed Shire Council and the administrators of the Doug Moran National Portrait Prize resulted in the earliest winning artworks being separated from others, Fairbairn's 2002 winning portrait of his wife is the earliest displayed in the current Moran prize collection.

Fairbairn's most recent Art work was the one that he called Large head JB no 1
