= List of Archibald Prize 1938 finalists =

1938 Archibald Prize finalists

This is a list of finalists for the 1938 Archibald Prize for portraiture, listed by Artist and Title. As the images are copyright, an external link to an image has been listed where available.

Artist	Title	Subject	Notes
Harold Abbott	Self-portrait		
A. F. Andrews	Self-portrait		
A. F. Andrews	The Artist's Father		
John Aston	L. H. Witts, Esq.		
James Muir Auld	Lady in Black		
James Muir Auld	F. Tregear, Esq.		
Alan Baker	Miss Videy Ross		
Alan Baker	Self-portrait		
Normand Baker	Alan D. Baker, Esq.		
Normand Baker	Self-portrait		
A. M. E. Bale	Miss E. M. Lander		
Rex Battarbee	Albert Namatjira (Arunta artist)		
Ronald Broadley	Self-portrait		
Norman Carter	A. Enes, Esq.		
Norman Carter	Hans Heysen		
Myra Cocks	Portrait of a Lady		
William Gilbert Collins	Self-portrait		
A. D. Colquhoun	Miss Janet Maloney		
A. D. Colquhoun	Miss Olga Hausegger		
A. D. Colquhoun	Miss Janet McEwan		
A. D. Colquhoun	(Title unknown)		
Thomas Dean	Self-portrait		
Aileen R. Dent	Miss Joyce Raymond		
Aileen R. Dent	Rev. F. E. Oxer		
Claude S. Diston	Lt. Col. J. N. Coryn Shaw		
Douglas Dundas	Alfred Cook, Esq.		
Mary Edwell-Burke	B. J. Waterhouse, Esq., F.R.I.B.A.		
Mary Edwell-Burke	Self-portrait		
Owen Garde	Self-portrait		
John Barclay Godson	Artist and wife		
Helena Nellie Govett	Portrait		
J. H. Graham	Joshua Smith		
Vaughan Murray Griffin	Mrs Murray Griffin		
A. F. Hancox	Self-portrait		
Henry Aloysius Hanke	Percy Lindsay, Esq.		
Henry Aloysius Hanke	Miss Sylvia Davis		
John R. Heath	Dr W. A. Morrison, LDS., R.C.S.		
Edward Heffernan	Diane in Red		
John J. Hennessy	Self-portrait		
Nora Heysen	Mme Elink Schuurman		(Winner: Archibald Prize 1938)
Nora Heysen	The Hon. John Lane Mullins		
Leon Hogan	Miss M. Parsons		
Ethel Holmes	Portrait of a lady		
Tom Hubble	Mrs Francis V. Molyneaux		
Tom Hubble	Frederick E. Baume, Esq.		
J. C. Hutchings	Self-portrait		
Rupert Hutter	Self-portrait		
Reginald Jerrold-Nathan	Miss Camilla Wedgewood		
Reginald Jerrold-Nathan	Self-portrait		
Reginald Jerrold-Nathan	Dr Cecil Purser		
Margaret Gordon Johnson	Mrs Grabham		
Bertha Katsch	Gipsies		
Herbert Kemble	Louise Allen		
Herbert Kemble	Dante Arrie		
Herbert Kemble	Raymond Sinnot, Esq.		
Herbert Kemble	Geoffrey Cumine		
Clement Charles Kennedy	Clement Kennedy		
Clement Charles Kennedy	Thea Rowe		
Clement Charles Kennedy	Meg.		
Garrett Kingsley	Murilla		
Garrett Kingsley	Norma		
Frederick William Leist	C. Pearl, Esq.		
Frederick William Leist	Stephanie Day		
Frederick William Leist	Mrs Charles, MA		
Herbert W McCulley	Self-portrait		
Alfred Ernest MacDonald	W. C. Milne, Esq.		
Violet M. McInnes	Miss Joan Mita		
W. B. McInnes	Sir Robert Wade		
W. B. McInnes	Miss Susan Williams		
W. B. McInnes	Gen Sir Harry Chauvel		
Alex McMurtrie	Dignity and impudence		
Langton Madden	Self-portrait		
Tempe Manning	Peter Lawrence, Esq.		
Max Meldrum	Self-portrait		
Max Meldrum	Prof. W. Agar, F.R.S.		
Miriam Moxham	Henry B. Rain, Esq.		
Miriam Moxham	Miss Myra Cocks & Elaine		
G. Needham	Lionel Shave, Esq.		
A. E. Newbury	W. J. Penfold, M.B., C.M. (Edin.), B.Hy. (Dunclm)		
Eric Nilan	D. G. M. Jackson, Esq., MA		
Eric Nilan	D. Nelson, Esq.		
Justin O'Brien	Miss Dorothy Johnston		
Roy Opie	Mr James Opie		
Roy Opie	L. Reynolds, Esq.		
T. R. Palmer	Self-portrait		
Esther Paterson	Miss Betty Paterson		
C. W. Peck	Mrs Drinkwater		
C. W. Peck	One of the Smith family		
Clif Peir	Miss Kathleen Maxwell		
Clif Peir	Miss Ann		
James Quinn	Rt. Hon. R. G. Casey		
Joan E. Reid	Portrait of a Boy		
Stuart Reid	A. R. J. Watt, Esq., K.C.		
C. Darcy Rendalls	Portrait of a man		
Eileen M. Robertson	My Sister		
Mollie Rohr	The Maid		
Mollie Rohr	Miniature		
Mollie Rohr	Portrait of a Man		
Mollie Rohr	Self-portrait		
Mollie Rohr	The final likeness		
J. H. R. Rousel	Rt. Hon. Sir Earle Page, K.C.M.G.		
J. H. R. Rousel	Thos. Porter, Esq.		
John Thomas Nightingale Rowell	Murray Griffin, Esq.		
William Rowell	Arltingah		
William Rowell	Bernard O'Dowd, Esq.		
William Rowell	Rt. Hon. R. G. Menzies		
Eric Saunders	Lewis Gooresky		
Eric Saunders	Duncan MacDougall		
Eric Saunders	Daphne Winslow		
Reginald Jack Shepherd	Judith Ann		
Reginald Jack Shepherd	Ald. Mrs Fowler		
Albert Victor Simmons	Mrs Thomas [sic]		
David Sing	Mrs E. Thomasson		
David Sing	Miss Sanchia Thomasson		
David Sing	Mr W. Magee		
Joshua Smith	Mrs Louisa Smith		
Joshua Smith	John Graham, Esq.		
Joshua Smith	Miss Dymphna Cusack		
W. Sprenger	Self-portrait		
E. Steitz	The hunter		
M. Summers	Self-portrait		
Beulah Symes Leicester	Dr Charles Fenner		
Stephanie Taylor	Mrs Alice Thomas		
Lesbia Thorpe	Miss Rose Broit		
Lesbia Thorpe	Mrs Havelock Southwick		
Frederick Lyttelton Tregear	Miss Badgery		
Lyall Trindall	Dr B. T. Edye		
Lyall Trindall	Rubery Bennett, Esq.		
Lyall Trindall	The Rt. Hon. The Lord Mayor, Ald. N. Nock		
Charles Wheeler	Mrs F. W. Dennett		
Charles Wheeler	Ernest Joske, Esq., LL B		
Harold V. Whitlock	The blue cape		
Harold V. Whitlock	Edith		
Dora Wilson	Alan Marshall, Esq.		
Dora Wilson	Miss Sybil Craig		
Joseph Wolinski	Rosine Guiterman, MA		
Joseph Wolinski	Margaret Swann		
Joseph Wolinski	K. R. Cramp, Esq, OBE, MA		
Joseph Wolinski	Roderic Quinn		
Joseph Wolinski	T. Stuart Gurr, Esq.		
Joseph Wolinski	C. H. Harrison, Esq., B.A.		
Arnold Zimmerman	Here's luck		
Arnold Zimmerman	S. G. Thorpe, Esq.		
Arnold Zimmerman	Bitter wine	self-portrait	
Melba van der Velden	Self-portrait		

== See also ==
- Next year: List of Archibald Prize 1939 finalists
- List of Archibald Prize winners
- Lists of Archibald Prize finalists
