= List of Archibald Prize 1946 finalists =

This is a list of finalists for the 1946 Archibald Prize for portraiture. (listed is Artist – Title) As the images are copyright, an external link to an image has been listed where available.

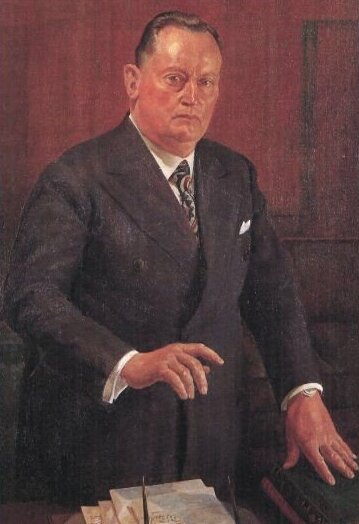
Joshua Smith: Frank Forde

Artist	Title	Subject	Notes
Harold Abbott	Self Portrait	Harold Abbott	
Alan Baker	Artist's Wife		
Normand Baker	Self Portrait	Normand Baker	
Howard Barron	The Most Rev. James Duhig, D.D., LL.D., Archbishop of Brisbane	James Duhig	
Howard Barron	Pamela, Daughter of Mr and Mrs Cobcroft		
Mary Brady	Artist's Brother		
Mary Brady	Josephine		
Daysi M Brookes	John Allcott		
Maude E M Burrell	Captain H M Burrell		
Charles Bush	Phyl Waterhouse		
Jack Carington Smith	Grey, green and brown		Image
Jack Carington Smith	Portrait Study		
Norman Carter	Roy Hendy, CMG		
W Chamberlain	Mr Spencer-Nolan		
A D Colquhoun	Portrait study		
William Dargie	L C Robson, MC, MA (Winner: Archibald Prize 1946)		Image
Antonio Dattilo-Rubbo	P. W. Gledhill, Esq.		
Aileen R Dent	Col. Wallace Ross		
William Dobell	Portrait of Mrs F Clune		Image
Albert Enes	Janet		
Albert Enes	Self Portrait		
Donald Fogarty	John Aitchison-Campbell		
Garran-Brown	Mrs Garran Graham Brown		
J C Goodhart	Portrait Study		
Leonard James Green	Hon. Sir Norman Kater, Kt., M.L.C.	Norman William Kater	
Harold Greenhill	Mrs R. Kerslake		
Geffrey Grey	Self Portrait		
Paul Haefliger	Annette		
Henry Aloysius Hanke	John Frith		
Rolf Harris	Portrait of a School Boy (self portrait)	Rolf Harris	(self portrait painted when aged 16)
E A Harvey	Ronald McKie		
Weaver Hawkins	Neura Hall		
Newton Hedstrom	Sgt. Bowman		
Sali Herman	Self Portrait	Sali Herman	
Malcolm C Hone	Professor Harold Woodruff	Harold Addison Woodruff	
J C Hutchings	"Margaret"		
Robin Jansen	Miss D. Hemingway		
Reginald Jerrold-Nathan	Mrs Eric Campbell		
Reginald Jerrold-Nathan	Headmaster		
Mollie G Johnson	Evadne Fenn-Lusher, solicitor		
Mollie G Johnson	Miss Nan Lyall		
Justus Jorgensen	Portrait Study		
Justus Jorgensen	Portrait Study		
Vincent Juradowitch	V. Charlesworth		
J Noel Kilgour	Mr. and Mrs. C. H. Vacchini		
Garrett Kingsley	Mrs. D. Pratten		
Garrett Kingsley	Mr. Gordon Russell		
Ronald J Laskie	The Artist's Brother		
E J Malouf	Her Wedding Day		
Joseph Wilson Mawhinney	Self Portrait		
Joseph Wilson Mawhinney	Lajos Stiener		
Herbert McClintock	Self Portrait		
Brian Midlane	Miss M. D. Paxton		
Rufus Morris	Ted Scorfield, Esq.	Ted Scorfield	
Arthur J Murch	Professor Robert Dicks		
Desiderius Orban	Self Portrait		
Ruth Pasco	Moira		
Frank Payne	David Mark Hutchinson-Smith		
L. Scott Pendlebury	Professor W. A. Osborne		
A W Sampson	Mr. W. Macreadie		
A W Sampson	Mr. Golding		
Francis Sherwood	Self Portrait		
C Neville Smith	The Age of Innocence		
C S Smith	Mr Karl Burggraf		
Joshua Smith	Hon W J McKell, KC, Premier of NSW	William McKell	Image
Joshua Smith	Hon. F. M. Forde, P.C., Australian High Commissioner to Canada	Frank Forde	Image
L Snyder	Self Portrait		
Lionel H Taprell	D. H. Taprell		
Harold L Thornton	William Roberts		
Wallace Thornton	Self Portrait		
Lyall Trindall	Miss Treasure Casey, M.R.A.D.		
Lyall Trindall	Mr. Newell R. Shead		
Hayward Veal	Michael Romanoff		
Hayward Veal	Father Coaldrake		
J Waugh	Self Portrait		
Charles Wheeler	H. J. Stewart, M.A.		
Joseph Wolinski	Will Lawson		
Joseph Wolinski	Self Portrait		
Eric Wright	Mr. H. Shepherd		
V Zanalis	Michael Dryen, M.P.S.		

== See also ==
- List of Archibald Prize winners
- Lists of Archibald Prize finalists
