= Society of Women Painters =

Australian women's art group

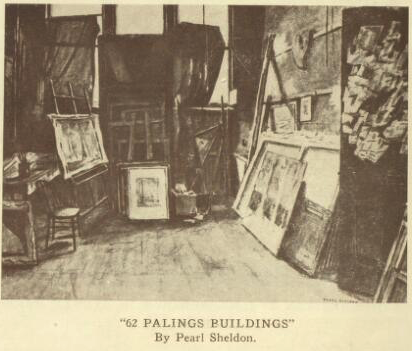
'62 Palings Buildings' by Pearl Sheldon - the art studio shared by Edith and Aline Cusack, where the inaugural meeting of the Society of Women Painters was held

The Society of Women Painters was a major art group in Sydney, New South Wales, Australia in the early 20th century with a significant history across three decades. Significant women creatives of the period such as Eirene Mort, Florence Taylor, Florence Rodway, Ethel Stephens, Ruby Winckler, Maude Sherwood, Frank Payne, Bernice Edwell, Hulda Marshall and Gladys Owen had long connections to the Society of Women Painters and unlike later art historians, contemporary sources document most members as being well trained active professionals with noticeable public profiles, rather than suburban hobbyists.

== Establishment ==
The establishment of the Society of Women Painters was the culmination of nearly two decades of advocacy and activism for women artists, frequently centred around Ethel Anna Stephens, who was elected to the committee of the Royal Art Society in 1892 to represent the interests of the many female exhibitors. Women made up at least a quarter of the members but had little say in the governance of the organisation. Women artists had been among the large group of artists discontent with selection policies in the two major art groups towards the end of the first decade of the twentieth century.

"During the past three years the pressure of exhibitors claiming space at the Royal Art Society's annual show has led to a good deal of discontent and in 1908 two or three groups of women painters held exhibitions of their own with a large measure of success."

The bickering around and between various art groups led to representatives of the Society of Artists making deputations to politicians and demanding that the government pressure the Royal Art Society to share their premises with other groups or otherwise the government should build a new exhibition gallery for other Sydney groups. The Society of Artists' "interests were also identical with those of the Society of Women Painters, the Institute of Architects, the Photographic Society, Arts and Crafts, and other kindred societies." No promise to do so was given.

The inaugural meeting to launch the society was held in Edith and Aline Cusack's studio in July 1909, and at a second meeting in August 1909 thirty members joined the society and a provisional committee selected pending formal election of officer bearers. Miniaturist, Bernice Edwell was a founding council member. Emily Meston and Lilian Chauvel were the contacts for membership. The press noted that the group "really grew into being through the discontent of certain exhibitors in having a percentage of their work excluded from the Royal Art Society's and the Society' of Artists' exhibitions." In some ways the Society of Women Painters had a more overtly feminist origin than the much longer lived Melbourne Society of Women Painters and Sculptors. Yet from the very start, the Society of Women Painters also identified itself with the most prominent sectors of Sydney society, inviting Lady Chelmsford the governor's wife, who enjoyed painting, both to show work and be the president of the society. She also opened the first exhibition. In 1928 Lady Fuller, seated on a throne in a bower of greenery, was crowned Queen by Ethel Stephens, in front of 200 guests at the Society of Women Painters' fundraising pageant. This alignment to socially prominent personalities was not untypical of other art and applied art groups in early and mid 20th century Sydney, such as the Arts and Crafts Society and the Embroiderers' Guild.

== Reviews ==
The Society of Women Painters regularly received poor notices from Sydney critics. "From the point of view of the art critic there is little of significance to be noted. The contemporary movements find no echo in this sheltered haven. A feminine flair for prettiness, for apt flower arrangement for agreeable but never bold colour reigns. However the same critic also noted that the black and white section was more radical and "distinctive" in outlook than the oils and praised the work of printmakers, including Ethel Stephens, whose work it was claimed resembled the work of modernist Norbertine Bresslern-Roth. Likewise the official trade union paper, The Worker, had little positive to say. "The trouble with this exhibition is that most of the women painters have nothing to say; with the exception of Misses Davis, Rodway, Winckler, Rodd, MacWhannell, and one or two others, they show work that is uninspired, timid, and characterless. As a rule, women's imagination runs to flowers, peaceful landscapes, and animals."

The paradigmatic nature of the terms used in criticism of the society is apparent. Similar vocabulary was seen frequently in discussion of women artists throughout the early and mid 20th century in Australia. The concepts link into widely held beliefs aired by both conservative and radical male artists in Sydney, including, but not only, Lionel Lindsay. The accuracy of these comments cannot be tested because so few of the works by the society's members are held in public collections or appear on the art market.

== Exhibitions and work ==
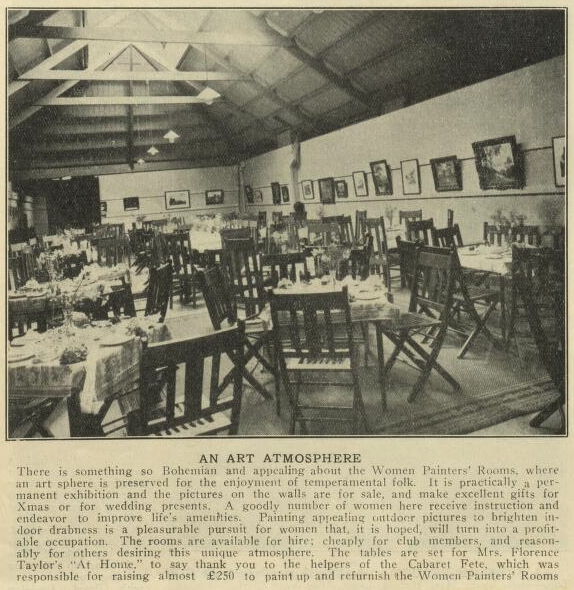
Women Painters' Rooms, freshly painted and refurbished, 1927.

Despite lukewarm reviews, the Society of Women Painters offered many resources to both its members and to the art scene in Sydney generally. As well as organising annual exhibitions, they operated club rooms which were available for social and cultural events and organised concerts and lectures. For some years a social auxiliary supported and raised funds for the society's art events. The architect Florence Taylor was active in this group, and she was an enthusiastic supporter of the society over a number of years. The Arts Club, which Taylor substantially ran in the 1920s, also assisted in fundraising for the society, including bridge parties and card afternoons. Most notable of the society's undertakings was establishing a School of Fine and Applied Art in 1920 under the directorship of Eirene Mort. "The present venture was to become a means of broader instruction than the existing schools; applied arts were to be included in the curriculum." A life class and landscape painting were other streams within the school. A number of prominent Sydney women artists taught at the school throughout the early and mid 1920s.

== Women's Industrial Art Society ==
In February 1935 "after 25 years of useful service, the council of the Society of Women Painters of New South Wales decided to enlarge its scope and activities and include arts connected with industry. It was explained that the purely studio work of painters was in no way to be altered, and that the only aim was for a higher standard. The society wanted to encourage students to try in a practical way to show in its exhibitions the various fields of work covered by women, as a guide and suggestion for an outlet for students' training and energies."

The first exhibition of the new society, renamed as the Women's Industrial Art Society, was impressive, and included works by Margaret Preston and Thea Proctor who showed infrequently with the society in the previous decade. It included sections for ecclesiastical work, (metalwork and textiles), commercial art and fashion illustration and student exhibits from the East Sydney Technical College and other art schools in Sydney. There were also fine arts exhibits, including by longstanding supporters of the Society of Women Painters such as Ethel Stephens and Maud Sherwood. The society remained active until c 1940, (as documented by Harry Tatlock Miller and Wassily de Basil speaking to the group) presented applied art demonstrations at the Sydney Easter Show in 1938, entertained members of the Ballets Russes, discussed and later exhibited stage designs and organised exhibitions of photography, Chinese art and design, textiles and posters among other media including contemporary work. The society does not seem to have survived post-World War II.

== See also ==
- Melbourne Society of Women Painters and Sculptors
