= List of Archibald Prize 1939 finalists =

1939 Archibald Prize finalists

This is a list of finalists for the 1939 Archibald Prize for portraiture, listed by Artist and Title. As the images are copyright, an external link to an image has been listed where available.

Artist	Title	Subject	Notes
Harold Abbott	Mrs R Abbott		
Harold Abbott	Mrs C de Burgh		
Harold Abbott	Miss Margaret Murray		
Harold Abbott	Neil McNeil, Esq		
Harold Abbott	Robert Gillespie, Esq		
James Muir Auld	Self-portrait		
Herbert Badham	Self-portrait		
Alan Baker	Portrait of a man		
Reginald Thomas Bassett	Self-portrait		
Douglas Baulch	Self-portrait		
Daysi M. Brookes	Dr E McAustin Steel		
Daysi M. Brookes	Robert McKechnie, Esq		
Ernest Buckmaster	Self-portrait		
Jack Carington Smith	Sir John Ramsay		
Frank R. Carter	Mrs Beryl James		
Norman Carter	Paymaster Lieut Keith H Waterhouse, RAN, VR		
Norman Carter	R B Kelly, Esq, DVSc		
Amalie Sara Colquhoun	Ellen		
Roy Dalgarno	Prof J V Duhig, MB, FRACP		
William Dargie	Self-portrait and mask		
William Dargie	The artist's wife		
Joseph Ben de Bolle	Major Gen. W. A. Coxen, C.B., C.M.G./D.S.O.		
Ayesha Dean	Portrait of a man		
Aileen R. Dent	C N McKenzie, Esq (President Melbourne Scot)		
E. C. Draper	Portrait of a Lady		
Elsie Elder	Mr Casey, MP		
Nell Eveston	Olive		
Nell Eveston	Gloria Favolora		
Nell Eveston	Mrs Loschiavo		
Marjorie Glyn-Edwards	Hugh Reilly, Esq.		
John Barclay Godson	Hilda		
John Barclay Godson	Self-portrait		
John Barclay Godson	Johnnie		
Helena Nellie Govett	Sir Harold Gengoult Smith		
Gwendolyn Grant	Ann		
Gwendolyn Grant	John Ramsay, Esq.		
William Gregory Grant	Mrs Gwendolyn Grant		
Harley Griffiths (junior)	O Dutton, Esq		
Harley Griffiths (junior)	Portrait of a pugilist		
A. F. Hancox	Self-portrait		
Henry Aloysius Hanke	The pink wrap		
Henry Aloysius Hanke	Self-portrait		
John R. Heath	Emeritus Prof. W. Gilmour		
Joseph Holloway	Roy Thibou, Esq.		
Edith L. Holmes	My aunt		
Ursula Holterhoff	Self-portrait		
Tom Hubble	Julian		
Evan Hughes	Bruce Salter, Esq.		
Harold Stafford Huntley	Miss Eula Ross		
Rupert Hutter	Self-portrait		
Reginald Jerrold-Nathan	Mrs C Corsellis		
Margaret Gordon Johnson	Lieut Col GFG Wieck		
Margaret Gordon Johnson	Miss Berna Begley		
Margaret Gordon Johnson	G Pitt Morison, Esq, curator, Perth Art Gallery		
Eric Kaylock	Self-portrait		
Herbert Kemble	Louise A		
Clement Charles Kennedy	D.A.W. Robertson, Esq.		
Clement Charles Kennedy	Miss Gwen Friend		
Clement Charles Kennedy	Miss Barbara Dare		
Theo M. Kielly	Self-portrait		
J. Noel Kilgour	Mrs Nancy Kilgour		
Edwin Harold King	Portrait of a man		
Edwin Harold King	The Artist's Brother		
Edwin Harold King	The Artist's Sister		
Garrett Kingsley	John G. Lindsay, Esq		
Garrett Kingsley	Portrait of a Lady		
Frederick William Leist	Miss Sheila Mitchell		
Albert Leyshon	Self-portrait		
Herbert W. McCulley	Self-portrait		
R. J. McFadden	Portrait of a man		
R. J. McFadden	Self-portrait		
G. M. McHolme	Self-portrait		
Tempe Manning	Father Cohen, CA (Father Superior, House of the Ascension, Goulburn, NSW)		
Tempe Manning	Colin E. Anderson, Esq.		
Tempe Manning	Major C.E.T. Newman ( Indian Army)		
Tempe Manning	Self-portrait		
Max Meldrum	Hon G. J. Bell, CMG, DSO, VD (Speaker, House of Representatives)		(Winner: Archibald Prize 1939)
R. A. Morrisey	Miss Maureen Morrisey		
Lionel Neate	Mr W. R. Hurst, A.R.C.O.		
Percival James Norton	Mrs G. Davis		
Percival James Norton	P. W. Gledhill, Esq.		
Justin O'Brien	Eric Irvin, poet		
Justin O'Brien	Mrs Hodson		
Roy Opie	Harold Herbert, Esq.		
T. R. Palmer	Rev. C. R. King		
T. R. Palmer	The artist's bride		
Esther Paterson	Herman Gill, Esq.		
Esther Paterson	Miss Betty Paterson		
Clif Peir	Miss Genevieve Madden		
Russell W. Phillips	Self-portrait		
Russell W. Phillips	Portrait of a lady		
Muriel Pornett	Window light		
Harold Septimus Power	Dr A. E. Richardson, CMG, MAD (Oxon)		
M Prowse Carey	Self-portrait		
James Quinn	Self-portrait		
James Quinn	George Bell, artist and critic		
Stuart Reid	Mrs A. Thyne Reid		
Eileen M. Robertson	Self-portrait		
J. H. R. Rousel	Judge Coyle		
J. H. R. Rousel	George H. Forsyth, Esq.		
John Thomas Nightingale Rowell	Prof. A. Boyce Gibson, M.A. ( Oxon.)		
John Thomas Nightingale Rowell	John Bowles, Sculptor [sic]		
William Rowell	Jackeroo		
William Rowell	Major-Gen Sir William Glasgow, KCB, CMG, DSO, VD		
William Rowell	Dr A. E. Mills		
William Rowell	Francis de Castella		
Horace Rudgley	Mrs H Rudgley		
Samuel Rudgley	Self-portrait		
A. W. Sampson	Margaret Verrell		
Eric Saunders	Kylie Tennant		
Eric Saunders	Mischa Burlakov		
Roderick Shaw	Richard Edwards, BA		
Reginald Jack Shepherd	Laurel		
Joshua Smith	Sister M Deane		
W. Sprenger	Self-portrait		
S. Scott Sudlow	Self-portrait		
Graham A. Thorley	Senator Major-Gen CH Brand, CBCMG, CVO, DSO		
Dora Toovey	Miss Ruth Eason		
Frederick Lyttelton Tregear	Self-portrait		
Lyall Trindall	Mrs R Rajola		
Albert Tucker	Harry de Hartog		
Roland Wakelin	Mother and child		
Leslie J. Walker	F. Pidcock, Esq.		
Leslie J. Walker	A. C. Martin, Esq.		
Douglas Watson	Self-portrait		
Harold V. Whitlock	Self-portrait		
Rita Wilson	Self-portrait		
Margery Withers	R McCann, Esq		
Joseph Wolinski	Thomas Ranken, Esq.		
Joseph Wolinski	H. Neville Smith, Esq.		
Joseph Wolinski	Ald. E. S. Marks.		
Joseph Wolinski	Desiderius Orban		
Joseph Wolinski	Self-portrait		
Arnold Zimmerman	Self-portrait		
Arnold Zimmerman	S. G. Thorpe, Esq.		
Arnold Zimmerman	Bitter wine	self-portrait	
Melba van der Velden	Self-portrait		

== See also ==
- Previous year: List of Archibald Prize 1938 finalists
- List of Archibald Prize winners
- Lists of Archibald Prize finalists
