= Muskett =

Muskett is a surname. Notable people with the surname include:

- Alice Jane Muskett (1869–1936), Australian painter and writer
- Arthur Edmund Muskett (1900–1984), British botanist and mycologist
- Emily Muskett (born 1989), British weightlifter
- Jennie Muskett, British television composer
- Netta Muskett (1887–1963), English writer
- Philip E. Muskett (1857–1909), Australian physician and health reformer
- Malcolm John Muskett English poker player

== See also ==
- Hunter Muskett, an English folk rock band
- Musket, a type of firearm
