= Ruby Winckler =

Australian artist (1886–1974)

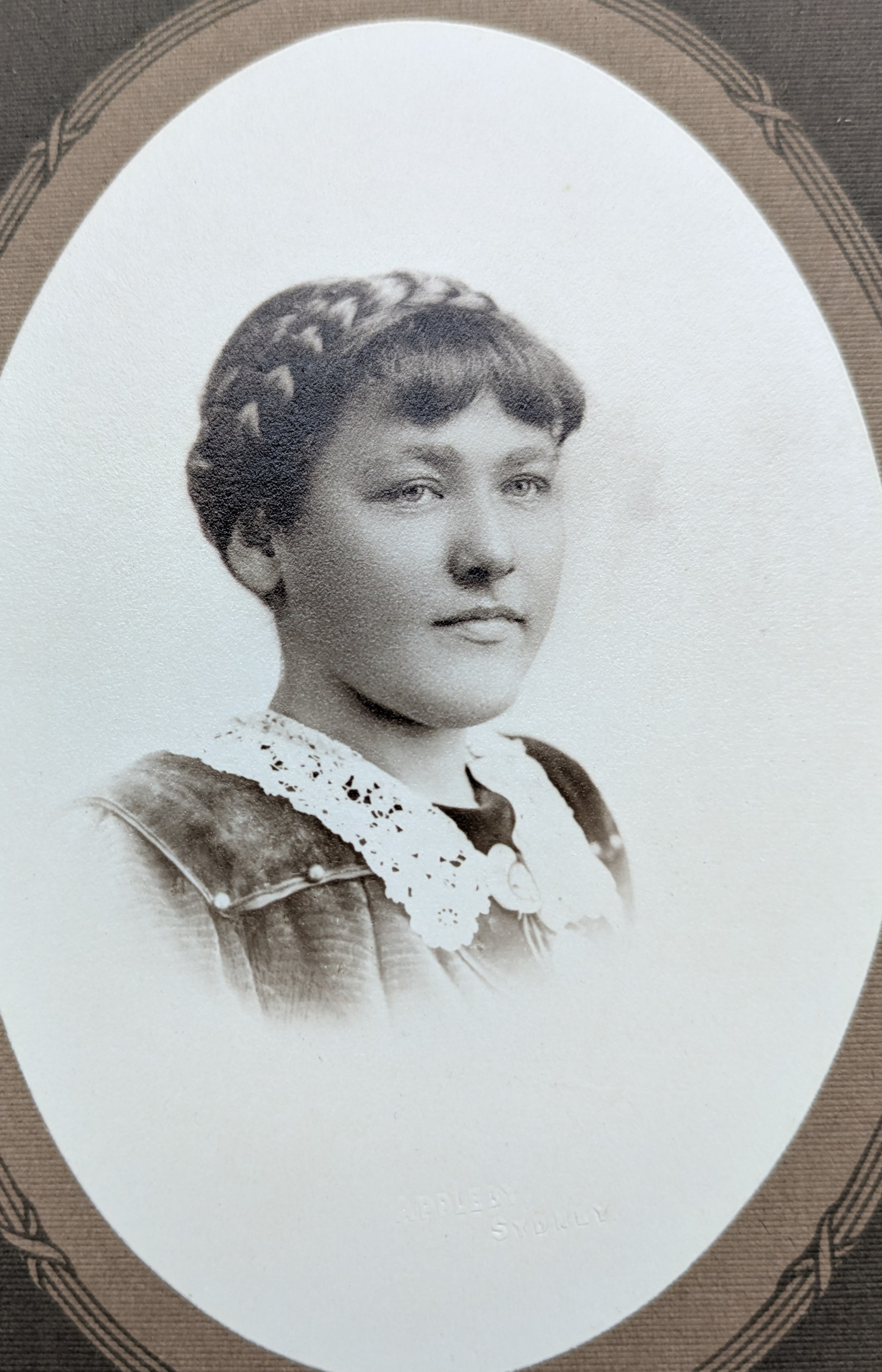
- Born: 25 August 1886; Sydney, Australia
- Died: 29 July 1974 (aged 87); Sydney, Australia
- Education: Julian Ashton Art School
- Known for: Book illustration
- Notable work: Who's Who in the Land of Nod

Ruby Winckler (25 August 1886 – 29 July 1974) was an Australian artist.

== Biography ==
Winckler was born in Sydney 1886 to Captain Augustus Robinson Winckler and Jessie Louisa Winckler (née Green). She had a brother George born in 1889. Her father held a mining license at Kiandra and declared bankruptcy multiple times. Her brother served in the 2nd Battalion of the Australian Imperial Force in World War I where he was wounded.

Ruby studied art at the Julian Ashton School and with Sydney Long. She was friends with the Lindsay family and her art style was very similar to that of Ruby Lindsay. The Winckler family lived in Manly and when she wasn't working on her art Ruby was known to be a keen swimmer.

Her first exhibition was with the Society of Artists in 1907. She exhibited alongside female artists Alice Muskett and Ethel Stephens. She also designed a cover for The Lone Hand. The following year she exhibited some bookplates and in 1909 her pictures were commended for their "ambitious and promising effort."

Her work was already showing its originality from other female artists of the time with Sketch for a Frieze featuring the satyr from Greek mythology and fairy tale illustrations. She exhibited six large watercolours depicting the adventures of Cinderella. Winckler was also associated with the Society of Women Painters, as well as doing china painting. A large mural she created for the Society of Women Painters exhibition in 1913 was unfortunately damaged by fire and had a huge hole burned at the centre. She also showed with the Queensland Art Society that year.

In 1913 Winckler travelled to America where she was commissioned by a Boston firm to illustrate The Arabian nights' entertainments. After the author's son disliked some of her pictures causing them to be left out, Ruby remarked at she'd "rather illustrate the works of dead authors - they don't give any trouble." Despite this, her drawings were described as "finely drawn and sympathetic representations of scenes in the great story book."

She was the first of the Australian-born women who became children's book illustrators, with Edith Alsop's The Cobweb Ladder and Ida Rentoul Outhwaite's Elves and Fairies not coming out until 1916. She was also the first to reach an international audience, with Outhwaite only achieving this in 1921. She would also illustrate Kisington Town and Who's Who in the Land of Nod.

Winckler returned to Sydney in 1916 where she continued exhibiting her fantasy illustrations. She contributed to the Australian Soldiers Gift Book edited by Ethel Turner and Bertram Stevens. She was commissioned for a proposed illustrated version of Homer's Odyssey though this was never realised outside of exhibition. These drawings are now held in a private collection. Her last known exhibition was with the Society of Artists in 1918.

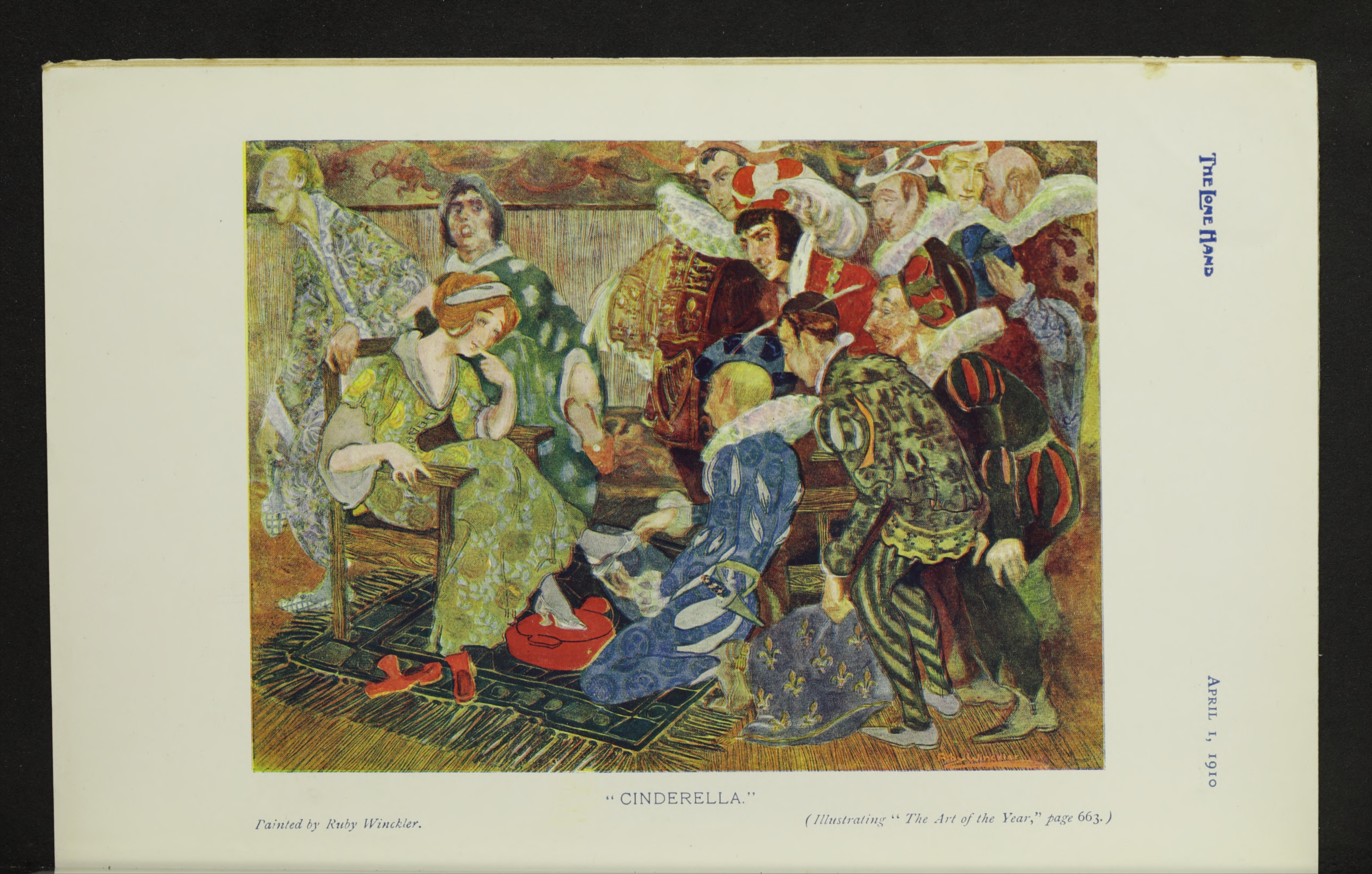
Cinderella illustration by Ruby Winckler published in The Lone Hand

Ruby Winckler's papers are held by the State Library of New South Wales, as well as select artworks.
