= Ethel Stephens =

Australian painter

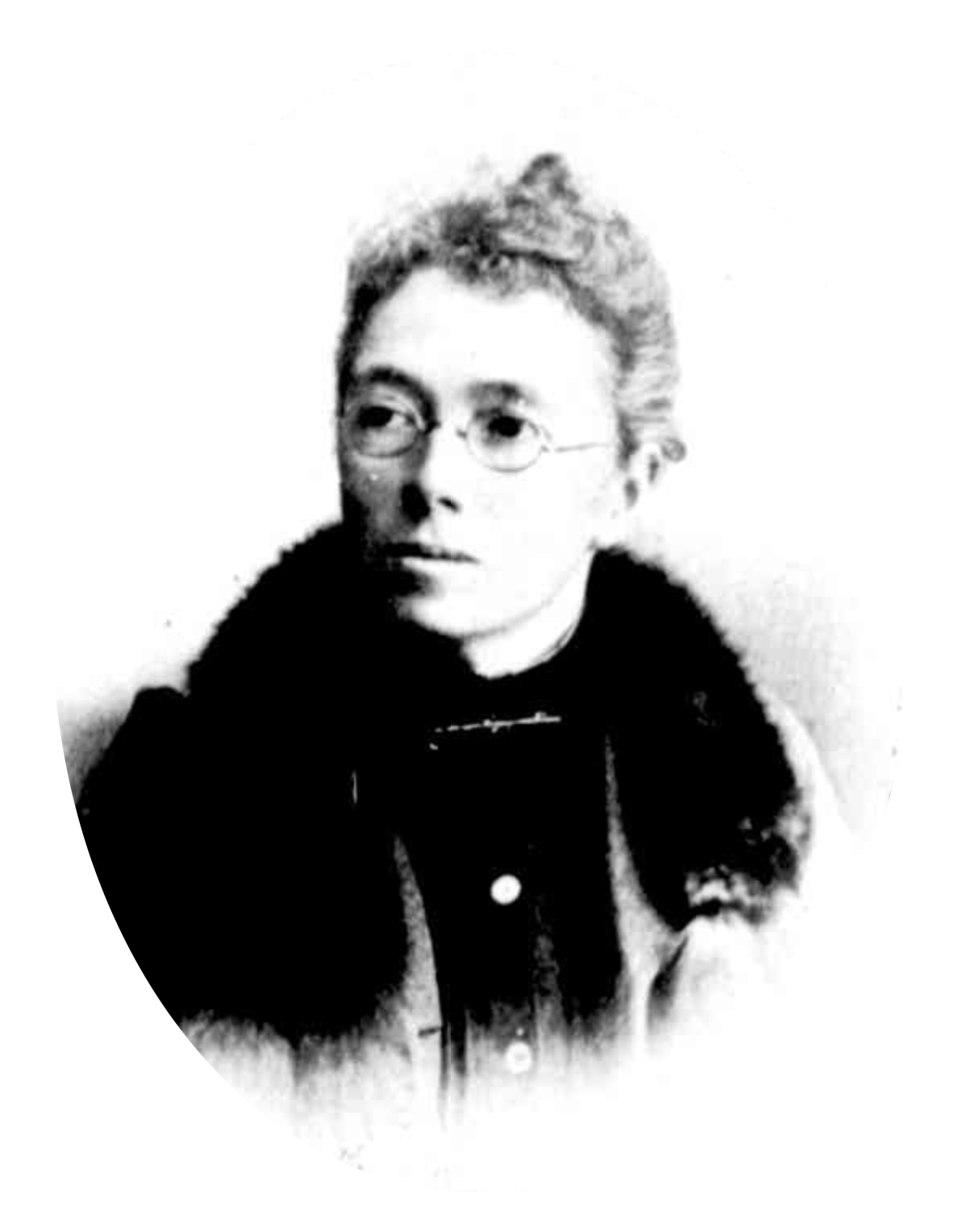
Ethel Stephens in 1907

Ethel Stephens (1864–1944) was an artist, printmaker, designer and advocate for women's art, resident and working in Sydney during the late 19th and early twentieth century. She was closely associated with a number of major art groups in Sydney including the Society of Women Painters, The Society of Arts and Crafts of NSW and the Royal Art Society of New South Wales.

== Early life ==
Ethel Anna Stephens was the daughter of educationalist and later professor at the University of Sydney William John Stephens and his wife Anna Louise Daniell.

Stephens became the first pupil of Julian Ashton in Sydney, launching his long career as a major art teacher in Sydney. Ashton said that that William Stephens had asked him to give lessons to his daughter. Ethel Stephens herself said that Ashton had seen her drawings by chance and offered to teach the emerging artist without knowing who had executed them, (or by implication the gender of the artist).

== Career ==
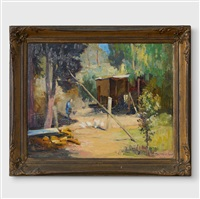
Resthaven, Impressionist painting by Ethel Stephens

Her friends and fellow artists included Eirene Mort, Edith and Aline Cusack and Alice Jane Muskett. All of her circle were committed to professional careers as artists and high profiled in late nineteenth and early twentieth century Sydney. She also adroitly leveraged off expected rituals of upper-class female socialising to create opportunities for gatherings of women artists and showing works, creating an innovative interstitial space that bypassed, whilst seemingly conformed to, limitations on respectable female movement and activities within the city. She founded the Sydney-based female art group, the Painting Club, c1893.

Stephens served on the inaugural committee of the Society of Women Painters, which was founded in 1910. She served as president between 1922 and 1929, and from 1932 to 1935. She was also a member of the committee of the Society of Arts and Crafts.

After the war ended, she travelled overseas in January 1920 and studied art in Paris including with Ethel Carrick Fox. She exhibited at the Paris Salon in 1921 and 1922. Whilst Ethel Carrick was travelling, Stephens stayed in her studio apartment on the Boulevarde Arago. Stephens returned to Sydney in 1922 and was elected President of the Society of Women Painters. In 1929–1930 she travelled overseas for a third time and took lessons in making modernist relief prints, which became her most radical tranche of practice. These prints were greatly admired when shown in the early 1930s.
