= Helen Hambidge =

Australian painter (1857–1937)

- Born: Helen Hambidge; 11 December 1857; Bendigo, Victoria
- Died: 1 February 1937 (aged 79); Royston Park, South Australia
- Known for: Portrait painting
- Elected: Honorary Member, South Australian Society of Arts

Helen Hambidge (11 December 1857 – 1 February 1937) was an Australian artist.

== Biography ==
Hambidge was born in 1857 in Bendigo, Victoria to William Benjamin Whitlock Hambidge and Leah Russell. She had five brothers and five sisters, and two of her sisters Alice and Millicent would also grow up to be artists. The family had returned to South Australia by 1860 where her parents had been married and where her father was a carpenter and builder.

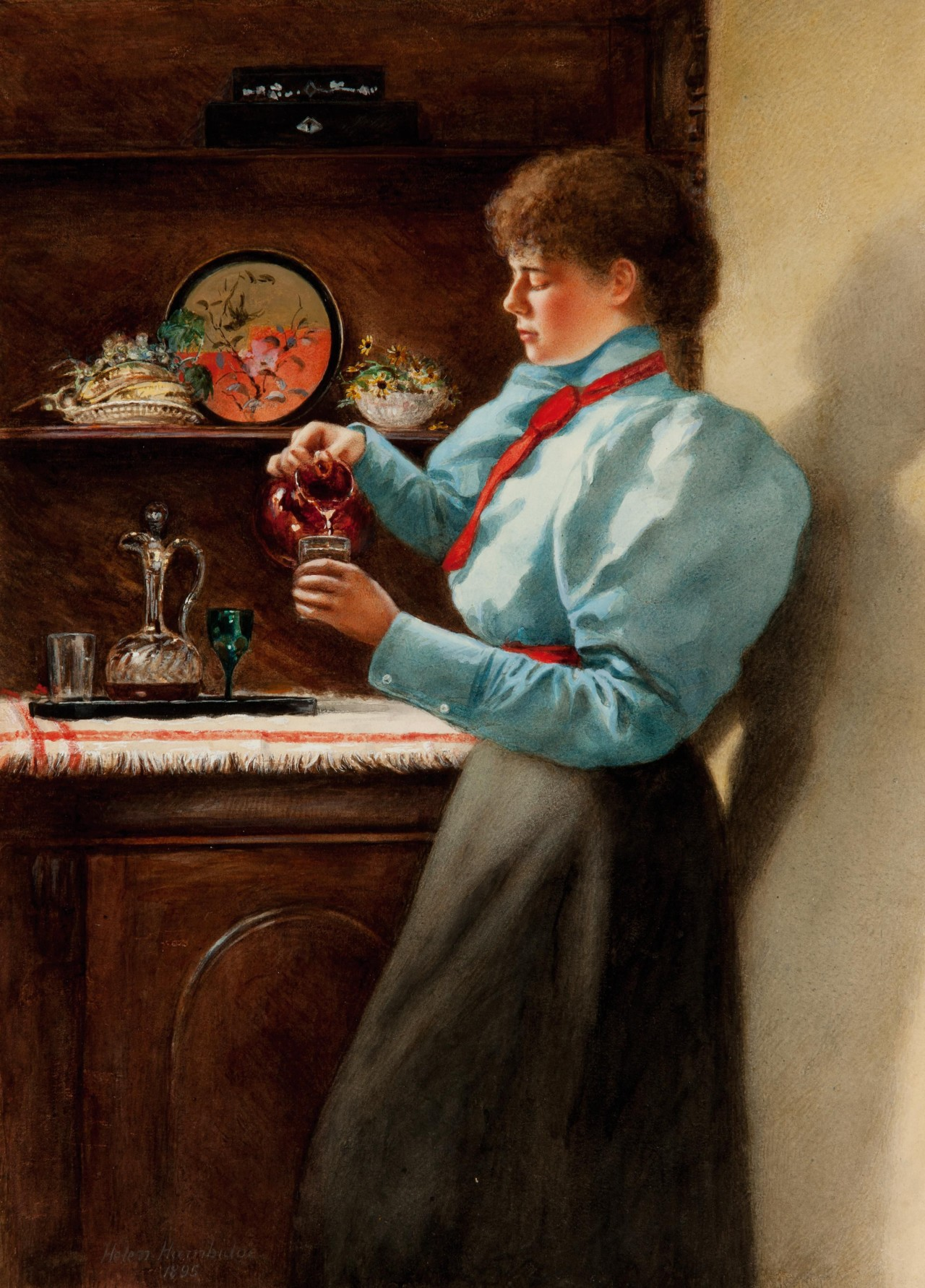
A Summer's Night by Helen Hambidge, Art Gallery of South Australia

She studied art under John Hood of Glenelg and later from H.P. Gill at the South Australian School of Art. She first exhibited at a show in Geelong in 1879. She also exhibited photographs as well as paintings. Like many working artists of the period, Hambidge was engaged in portraiture. In 1893 she was elected an associate of the South Australian Society of Arts. Her and sisters contributed 22 works to the society's exhibition that year. It was remarked "the artistic temperament is shared by all the Misses Hambidge." Their brother Bert who worked for the Land and Survey department also loved to sketch.

Her work continued to be exhibited over the decade and was selected for the Australian Art Exhibition in London. Her painting Summer Night was presented to the Public Library Board. She won a fine art award in figure drawing for her piece My Australian Cousin, bested only by her sisters. The sisters became quite well known for painting miniatures. As working artists particularly Helen was recognised with several purchases from notable people in South Australia. Their work was described by The Advertiser as "the best of its kind."

In 1905 her portrait Lady Gwendoline was purchased by the National Art Gallery, now the Art Gallery of New South Wales. That year Helen and her sisters would establish their reputations outside of South Australia with showings in Sydney and Melbourne. They had a lifelong friendship with H.P. Gill, and during his time as Honorary Curator of the Art Gallery of South Australia works by all three of them were acquired. Their notability meant they were often commissioned for works as well and they also taught students. The continued exhibiting in Sydney was alongside other noted female artists of the period Edith Cusack, Gladys Owen, and Bernice Edwell.

It is hard to separate the work of Helen Hambidge from that of her sisters. Helen died in 1937. Her work continues to be represented in the collections of the Art Gallery of New South Wales and the Art Gallery of South Australia.
