= List of Archibald Prize 1922 finalists =

This is a list of finalists for the 1922 Archibald Prize for portraiture. (listed is Artist – Title) As the images are copyright, an external link to an image has been listed where available.

Artist	Title	Subject	Notes
James Muir Auld	Portrait Mr Roderick Quinn		
A M E Bale	Portrait Miss Jo. Sweatman		
Lawson Balfour	Portrait of Mr Thomas Buckland		
Herbert Beecroft	Portrait Lady McMillen		
Herbert Beecroft	Portrait of Mr Q. L. Deloitte		
Herbert Beecroft	Mrs Beecroft		
F F Burmeister	Portrait of Mr Mitchell		
Norman Carter	Fernande		
Norman Carter	Portrait of Mr Peter Board		
Norman Carter	Portrait of Mr Hugh McCrae		
Bessie Cooper	Subject unknown		
Augustus Cornehls	Self Portrait	Augustus Cornehls	
Aileen R Dent	Mr Bernard Cronin		
Mary Edwell-Burke	Miss Nessie Tindall		
Mary Edwell-Burke	Mr J. H. M. Abbott		
Bernice Edwell	Sir Frank Moulden		
Charles Goode	Portrait Mr Trouchet		
May Grigg	Mr James Ashton		
May Grigg	Mr Thomas Grigg		
Lindsay Bernard Hall	Lady with Sponge		
Lindsay Bernard Hall	Sir Robt. Garran, K.C.M.G.		
G F Harris	Sir Geo Fuller		
G F Harris	Portrait		
Grace Hoy	Portrait of Mr Arthur Crocker		
James R Jackson	Portrait of Mr Cecil Hartt		
James R Jackson	Portrait of Hector Lamond		
A Elizabeth Kelly	Portrait of Mrs Hunter		
A Elizabeth Kelly	Portrait of Mrs Ernest Boulton		
George W Lambert	Self portrait	George W Lambert	
George W Lambert	General Chauvel		
Percy Leason	Portrait Mr John B Dalley		
John Longstaff	Portrait of Mr Edward W. Knox		
William Macleod	Portrait of Miss Ruby Adams		
William Macleod	Portrait of Mr Livingston Hopkins		
W B McInnes	Professor Harrison Moore		(Winner: Archibald Prize 1922)
W B McInnes	Portrait of Mr S Ure Smith		
W B McInnes	Professor Sir Thomas Tyle		
W B McInnes	Jean		
W B McInnes	Boy Barrett		
W B McInnes	Dr Hamilton		
Wolla Meranda	The Bookfellow		
Alfred William Pratt	Self Portrait	Alfred William Pratt	
William Albert Frederick Seppelt	Sir Douglas Mawson		
Jo Sweatman	Portrait Miss A.M.E. Bale		
Frederick Lyttelton Tregear	Self Portrait		
J S Watkins	Self Portrait	J S Watkins	
J S Watkins	Portrait Mr CA Jeffries		
Joseph Wolinski	Mr James Nangle		
Joseph Wolinski	Mr A. H. Fullwood		
Joseph Wolinski	Hon. Daniel Levy, M.L.A.		
Joseph Wolinski	Self Portrait	Joseph Wolinski	
Joseph Wolinski	Lt. Col. Purdy, D.S.O; M.D.		
A Marriott Woodhouse	An Australian Artist		

== See also ==
- Previous year: List of Archibald Prize 1921 finalists
- Next year: List of Archibald Prize 1923 finalists
- List of Archibald Prize winners
- Lists of Archibald Prize finalists
