= List of Archibald Prize 1923 finalists =

1923 Archibald Prize finalists

This is a list of finalists for the 1923 Archibald Prize for portraiture, listed by Artist and Title. As the images are copyright, an external link to an image has been listed where available.

Artist	Title	Subject	Notes
Lizzie McDougall Armstrong	L. Brook Armstrong		
James Muir Auld	Frank Hutchens		
James Muir Auld	Self-portrait		
A. M. E. Bale	James Anderson		
A. M. E. Bale	Miss E. Downing		
Lawson Balfour	A. Wallace Wichen, MD		
Lawson Balfour	Wm Lister Lister		
Lawson Balfour	Mrs Robson		
Herbert Beecroft	Thelma Harris		
George Bell	Daryl Lindsay		
Arthur Harold Brown-Beresford	Major General Sir Charles Rosenthal		
Norman Carter	David Reid		
Norman Carter	Portrait study		
Norman Carter	Peter Board		
Norman Carter	Leon Gellert		
Aileen R. Dent	Peter Kirk		
Bernice Edwell	L.A. Adamson, Esq		
Portia Geach	Mrs Edith Cowan		
May Gower	Miss McConaghy		
May Gower	Hammond Toms		
Lindsay Bernard Hall	Mrs Sydney Pern		
Lindsay Bernard Hall	General Ryan		
A. Elizabeth Kelly	Rev Charles Perry, MA		
Vince Lysaght	Sir Matthew Nathan		
W. B. McInnes	James Dyer		
W. B. McInnes	Sir Baldwin Spencer		
W. B. McInnes	Professor David Masson		
W. B. McInnes	Portrait of a lady		Winner: Archibald Prize 1923
William Macleod	Percy Leason		
William Macleod	Mary Edwards		
William Macleod	John Spence		
William Macleod	J. F. Archibald		
William S. Millington	Mrs Millington		
Agnes Paterson	Miniature		
Russell W. Phillips	Self-portrait		
Florence Aline Rodway	Sir Alexander MacCormick		
Clarice Sandford	Saunders F. Nicholls		
Arnold Joseph Victor Shore	Self-portrait		
S. Scott Sudlow	Self-portrait		
Jo Sweatman	Harold C. Smith		
Frederick Lyttelton Tregear	Mrs Wm Moore (Dora Wilcox)		
Frederick Lyttelton Tregear	Frank Hutchens		
Lyall Trindall	Mr E. Lyons		
Lyall Trindall	Self-portrait		
Charles Wheeler	Self-portrait		
Joseph Wolinski	J. C. Bradfield		
Joseph Wolinski	Thomas Nesbitt		
Joseph Wolinski	David Gilpin		
Joseph Wolinski	S. H. Solomon		
A. Marriott Woodhouse	Brigadier General W. Ramsay McNicoll		

== See also ==
- Previous year: List of Archibald Prize 1922 finalists
- Next year: List of Archibald Prize 1924 finalists
- List of Archibald Prize winners
- Lists of Archibald Prize finalists
