= Olive Kathleen Crane =

Australian artist

Olive Crane
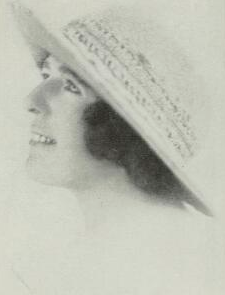
- Born: 9 May 1895; Ashfield, Sydney
- Died: 13 June 1935
- Education: Julian Ashton
- Alma mater: University of Sydney
- Known for: Watercolours, Cartoons
- Spouse: Kenneth Robertson Macqueen

Olive Kathleen Crane (9 May 1895 – 13 June 1935) was an Australian artist, known for book illustrations and etchings. She was married to watercolorist Kenneth Macqueen.

== History ==
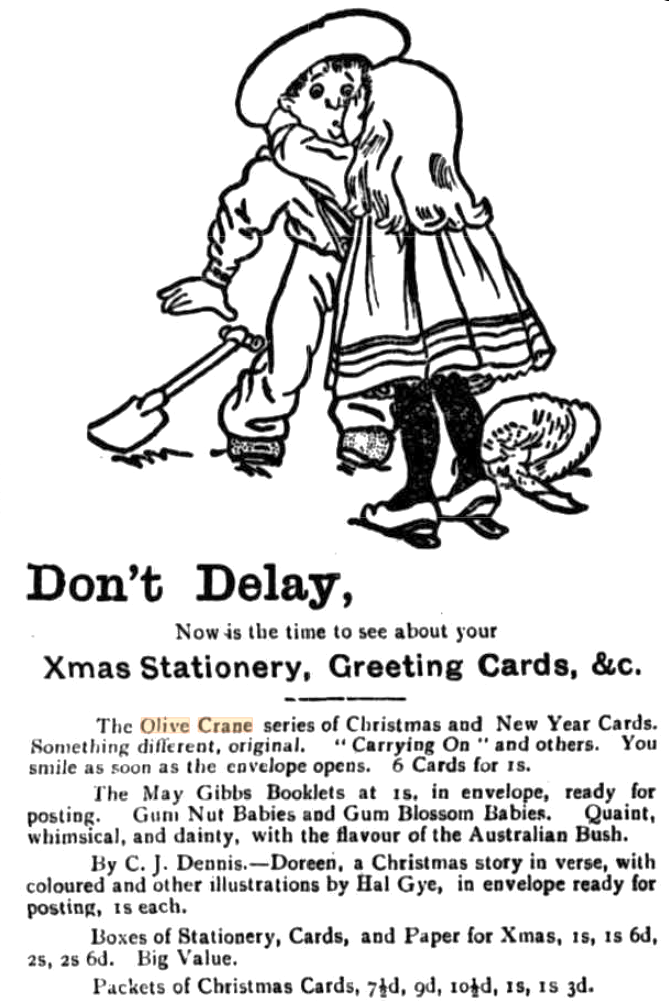
1917 Advertisement

Crane was born in Ashfield, Sydney, the youngest daughter of Jane Harrold Crane ( – 1 November 1927) and Walter G. Crane, of "Winsley", 80 Shirley Road, Wollstonecraft, Sydney. She was educated at the Presbyterian Ladies' College, where she was a highly successful student. She went on to Sydney University, graduating BA in 1917. She studied drawing at Julian Ashton's school under Albert Collins, counted with Grace Crowley and Myra Cocks as Ashton's "younger skilled brigade". In parallel with her academic career, she studied pianoforte, with considerable, if not outstanding, success. She showed ability as an artist and designer of greeting cards, winning a Christmas card competition in 1917, which led to commercial success, and won for her a "reputation for delicate and fanciful workmanship". Packs of six topically humorous greeting cards, bearing her name, went on sale alongside stationery from May Gibbs and C. J. Dennis. At the age of 22 "Olive Crane" was a household name. She was called on to illustrate bookplates and books for children, such as The City of Riddle-Me-Ree (1918) by Zora Cross, The Betty Songs by N. J. Cocks, and others of Angus & Robertson's stable. She later did work for Chatto & Windus.

But she was not to be defined by her cartoon work, no matter how popular and lucrative. She showed several watercolors in the Society of Artists' exhibition in 1920. One, The Tired Dancer, was purchased by the National Art Gallery of NSW, and later reproduced in Art in Australia. She was able to travel to Europe and London for further study, advancing her reputation as a serious artist, and creating a favorable impression at the Kensington Art School. Among works created during this time was the etching Jeune homme las (Tired Young Man, 1924), which in 1994 was purchased by the National Gallery of Australia. She returned to Australia in 1926 and married farmer and watercolor artist Kenneth Macqueen, painting together in their spare time and supporting him financially while he was struggling for recognition. She contributed to few exhibitions in this period, and gave birth to two children. She died in the months following the second birth.

== Personal ==
On 2 April 1926 Crane married Kenneth Robertson Macqueen They had two children, Marion and Revan. She died a few months after the birth of the son, and her sister Mildred helped Macqueen raise the family.
