= Kenneth Macqueen =

Australian artist (1897–1960)

Kenneth Robertson Macqueen (15 April 1897 – 21 June 1960) was an Australian farmer and artist, known for watercolors.

== History ==
Macqueen was born in Ballarat, a son of William Sweyn Macqueen DD. (c. 1860 – 1 November 1914), a Presbyterian minister, and Rachel Cecilia "Ray" Macqueen, née Robertson, later of Vaucluse Road, Vaucluse. Dr Macqueen was, in 1907, moderator of the General Assembly of Queensland.

He was educated at Bowen House School, and, after the family moved to New South Wales, Scots College, Sydney. He also took drawing lessons from Alfred Coffey. In February 1916 he enlisted with the First AIF and served in France. On his return to Australia he took up farming at Mount Emlyn near Millmerran, in the Darling Downs region of Queensland. In 1926 he married Olive Crane (1895–1935), a well-known artist, and together painted in their spare time.

Art historian Alan McCulloch observes that he was one the first Australian artists to paint watercolors in the modern style, producing simple formalized semi-abstract landscapes.

He was a member of the Royal Queensland Art Society, Australian Watercolour Institute and Contemporary Group, Sydney.

He exhibited at the Royal Academy, New English Art Club, and the Watercolor Institute's annual exhibitions.

He is represented in most Australian State galleries, as well as Ballarat and Wanganui, New Zealand. The Metropolitan Museum of Art in New York purchased his Cabbage Gums and Cypress Pines in 1941.

== Personal ==
On 2 April 1926 Macqueen married Olive Kathleen Crane (9 May 1895 – 13 June 1935) of Wollstonecraft, Sydney. They had two children, Marion and Revan. She died a few months after his birth, and her sister Mildred helped raise the family.

== Bibliography ==
- Macqueen, K., Adventures in Watercolour, The Legend Press, Sydney, 1948
