= Hugh Davidson (cricketer) =

Australian cricketer

Personal information
- Born: 17 May 1907; New South Wales, Australia
- Died: 22 April 1960 (aged 52); Wamberal, New South Wales, Australia
- Source: ESPNcricinfo, 26 December 2016

Hugh Davidson (17 May 1907 – 22 April 1960) was an Australian cricketer.

== Professional career ==
He played eleven first-class matches for New South Wales between 1927/28 and 1930/31.

== Personal life ==
His sister was artist Nancy Kilgour (1904–1954).

== See also ==
- List of New South Wales representative cricketers
