= Nancy Kilgour =

Australian painter (1904–1954)

Nancy May Kilgour (1904 – 5 March 1954) was an Australian painter. As Julia Barrett she wrote short stories.

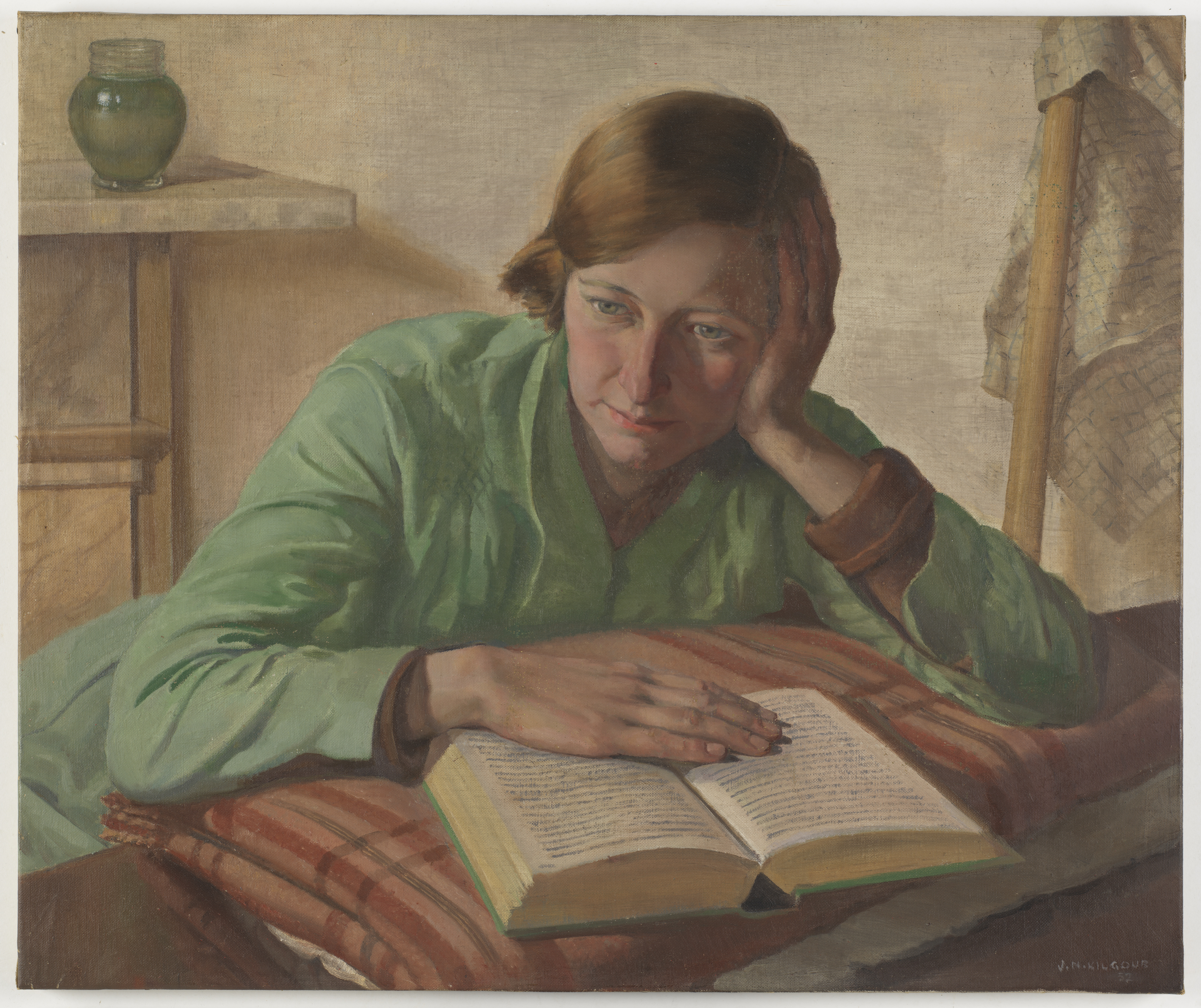
Portrait of Nancy May Kilgour, 1932, by Jack Kilgour

Nancy May Davidson was born in Melbourne, Victoria in 1904, daughter of Ethel Jessie (née Lavery) and Norman McLeod Davidson. The family moved to Sydney before the birth of her brother, cricketer Hugh Davidson, in 1907.

Kilgour studied art at the Sydney Art School run by Julian Ashton. She married fellow student, Jack Noel Kilgour, in March 1931. The couple sailed to London that year aiming to continue their studies in Europe, while supporting themselves by working in advertising and illustrating. Her husband entered a portrait of her in the 1939 Archibald Prize.

Following her return to Sydney, she held an exhibition at the Macquarie Galleries in 1940. Her paintings included both English and Australian landscapes. The Daily Telegraph reviewer noted her "subtle blend of realism and decoration" and her "fine sense of composition", while The Sydney Morning Herald critic commented on her use of "glowing colours" and "a happy patterning in various tones of green".

She died in Sydney on 5 March 1954.

== Legacy ==
Several of her paintings are held in the Art Gallery of New South Wales.

A retrospective exhibition of her work was held by the Hamer Mathew Galleries, Woollahra in 1985. Examples of her work were also included in the 1995 National Women's Art Exhibition, curated to coincide with the 20th anniversary of International Women's Day in Australia.
