= Edith and Aline Cusack =

Edith Cusack
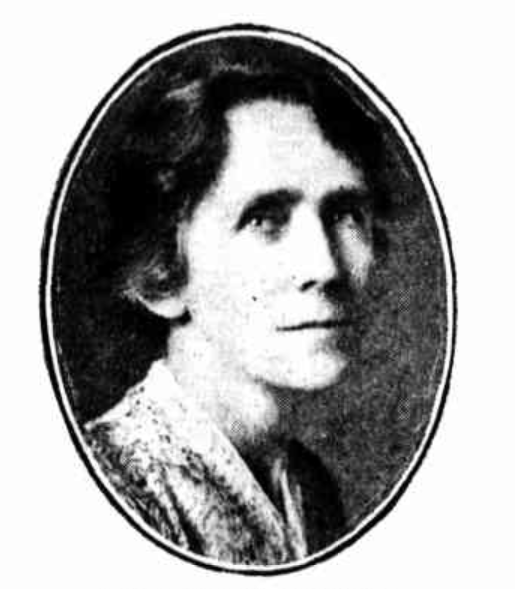
- Born: Eleanora Edith Cusack; 5 September 1865; Nelson, New Zealand
- Died: 20 May 1941 (aged 75); Pymble, New South Wales
- Known for: Painting
- Movement: Impressionism

Edith and Aline Cusack were New Zealand–born working artists and art teachers based in Sydney, Australia.

== Early life ==
Eleanora Edith Cusack (known as Edith) and Aline Margaret Cusack were born on 5 September 1865 and 6 March 1867 respectively in Nelson, New Zealand to Georgiana Frances and Samuel Athanasius Cusack. A large family of three sons and five daughters, their sisters Ellen and Maud would not survive childhood. There was another sister, Georgiana, and brothers Arthur, James, and Joseph. Their Irish-born father was a registered physician. Having emigrated to Australia, Samuel died in 1869 in East Maitland, New South Wales when his daughters were just three and nearly two years old. Georgiana was left to raise her young children alone in the colony.

== Education ==
The Cusack sisters were taught art by Joseph Arthur Bennett at his weekly art classes in Parramatta. Being unable to afford tuition, they worked for him as teaching assistants.

Edith won first prize at a Sydney art students' exhibition in 1890. She travelled abroad in 1892 to study at Académie Julian in Paris, staying there with fellow artist May Vale. Studying under Jules Joseph Lefebvre and William-Adolphe Bouguereau, her talent was recognised with acceptance of a picture into the Paris Salon. She would return to Sydney in 1894.

In 1904 Edith would again travel overseas for further study, taking a studio in Upper Cheyne-row, Chelsea. While abroad she would spend three weeks in Italy as well as spending time sketching in Ireland. While in London her paintings of Australian wildflowers would delight the English visitors, and she would spend time at the National Gallery making sketches of famous paintings.

Aline Cusack
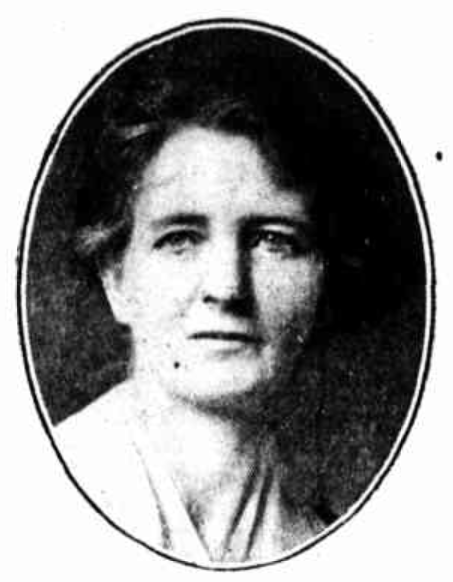
- Born: Aline Margaret Cusack; 6 March 1867; Nelson, New Zealand
- Died: 12 July 1949 (aged 82); Pymble, New South Wales
- Known for: Painting
- Movement: Impressionism
- Elected: Vice President, Society of Women Painters

Aline would travel to London in 1907 to study animal painting under Frank Calderon. She would also visit Paris like her sister before her, completing studies at the Académie Colarossi before returning to Sydney in 1908.

== Career ==
As early as 1908 the sisters were back in Sydney, working and teaching out of their studio at the Paling's Building. It was at this studio that the inaugural meeting of the Society of Women Painters would be held and Aline would be elected vice president. Both Edith and Aline would also be involved with the Art Society of New South Wales.

When exhibiting Aline's seascapes were worthy of note as well as her horse studies and her painting of the Irish Terrier Pat. Edith often exhibited flower studies such as the Australian native waratahs but she also excelled in portraits with one of Maori Mākereti Papakura. Edith's portrait Whispers from the Lips of Spring had the distinction of being the most popular in the watercolour room at the Art Society's 1901 exhibition.

As they produced art to support their family, the Misses Cusack would have at least five joint exhibitions of their work. In 1908 their exhibition complimented for its "versatility and breadth of style" and that it "avoids the rut of monotony" in a collection of over 100 oils and watercolours of figures, landscapes, flowers, and animals. In 1911, the aforementioned Waratahs and Maggie Papakura were shown. Their wonderful colourful scheme employed was remarked in 1913. The influence of their time overseas is reflected in 1921 and in 1926 they held their first Melbourne exhibition at Athenaeum Hall. The sisters were also represented in 1907's First Australian Exhibition of Women's Work.

Their success was such that as well as their studio in the city they were also housed in Lavender Bay. They were part of a Ladies Painting Club in Sydney alongside fellow female artists of the time Florence Greaves, Alice E. Norton, Alice J. Muskett, Jessie Scarvell, and Ethel Stephens.

== The war years ==
Edith and Aline intended to do further artistic pursuits abroad but arrived in London in 1914, two days after war was declared. They were to immediately volunteer their efforts for the British Red Cross Society. They travelled to rural England where they picked strawberries for farmers with their wages going to the Red Cross.

Given the choice between a cottage and a caravan they chose a caravan because, in Aline's words "It gave us a free, open life." When they weren't picking fruit they would picnic under the trees. Back in their London flat they housed two Belgian refugees. Even with most of the French art packed away, they were still able to glimpse a Matisse at the Leicester Galleries.

== Legacy ==
Edith died in 1941 and Aline in 1949. Though prolific exhibitors in their lifetime, very few of the sisters' works are held in public collections. The most grand are the portraits by Edith of her sister Aline in the Art Gallery of New South Wales. Significant works by Aline were acquired by the Sheila Foundation. Other works by Edith are held by the Stanton Library in North Sydney and the Newcastle Art Gallery.
