= List of Archibald Prize 1924 finalists =

This is a list of finalists for the 1924 Archibald Prize for portraiture, listed by Artist and Title. As the images are copyright, an external link to an image has been listed where available.

Artist	Title	Subject	Notes
James Muir Auld	Mr George Finey, artist		
A. M. E. Bale	Miss Mollie Agnew		
A. M. E. Bale	Miss Clive Walsh		
Lawson Balfour	Charles Bryant		
George Bell	Mrs Edward White		
James A Bowman	Mr Thomas Hall		
Ernest Buckmaster	Portrait of a lady		
Ernest Buckmaster	A Warrant Officer		
Ernest Buckmaster	Portrait of a violinist		
Norman Carter	Mr Bryce Carter		
John J Collins	Mr Fritz Bennecke Hart		
Bessie Cooper	Mrs Gunn		
Antonio Dattilo-Rubbo	Portrait of a lady		
Antonio Dattilo-Rubbo	Self-portrait		view portrait
Antonio Dattilo-Rubbo	Nelson Illingworth		
Thomas Dean	Portrait		
Aileen R. Dent	A L Montague (Professor of Music)		
Aileen R. Dent	Mr John D O'Hara (actor)		
Aileen R. Dent	Miss Ethel Wellesley (acts)		
Charles Goode	Self-portrait		
Ray S Gower	Lawson Balfour (artist)		
Ray S Gower	Portrait of a girl		
David Grieve	Self-portrait		
May Grigg	Miss Bertha Lavery		
John J Hennessy	Self-portrait		
John Macdonnel	Portrait		
W. B. McInnes	Sir Baldwin Spencer		
W. B. McInnes	Jean		
W. B. McInnes	Ruth		
W. B. McInnes	Mr Agar Wynn		
W. B. McInnes	Miss Collins		Winner: Archibald Prize 1924 view portrait
Benjamin Edward Minns	Portrait		
Harry Linley Richardson	Miss D K Richmond		
Joshua Smith	The Honourable A Bruntnell, MLA		
Frederick Lyttelton Tregear	The artist's mother		
J S Watkins	Professor Brennan		
Charles Wheeler	Portrait		
Charles Wheeler	Portrait		
A. Marriott Woodhouse	Self-portrait		
A. Marriott Woodhouse	Portrait of a lady		

== See also ==
- Previous year: List of Archibald Prize 1923 finalists
- Next year: List of Archibald Prize 1925 finalists
- List of Archibald Prize winners
- Lists of Archibald Prize finalists
