= Frank Payne =

Australian woman painter

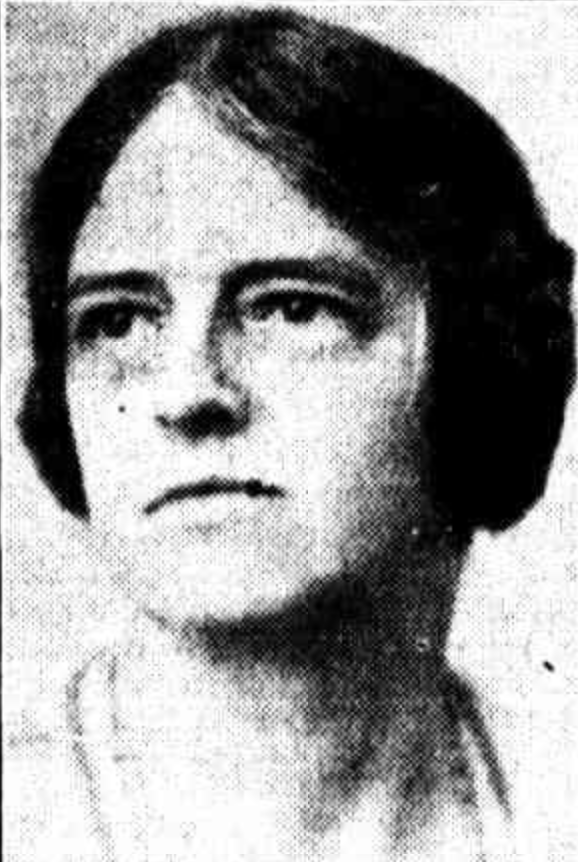
- Frank Payne Portrait
- Born: Frances Mallalieu Payne; 7 May 1885; Kangaroo Point, Brisbane, Australia
- Died: 11 July 1976 (aged 91); Normanhurst, Sydney, Australia
- Education: All Hallows' Convent; Brisbane Technical College; Académie Colarossi; École Nationale Supérieure des Beaux-Arts
- Occupations: Artist; Illustrator

Frances Mallalieu Payne (1885–1976), known as Frank Payne, was an Australian artist and illustrator.

Payne was born at Kangaroo Point, Brisbane, Australia on 7 May 1885 to Arthur Peel Payne, a shipping clerk, and his wife Julia Finch, née Batchellor , who were both born in England.

She was educated at All Hallows' Convent followed by Brisbane Technical College. At the latter she studied portraiture under Godfrey Rivers. From 1905–1906, she studied in Paris, at the Académie Colarossi, then at the École Nationale Supérieure des Beaux-Arts, and in London, where she worked in Frank Brangwyn's studio. She returned to Australia in September 1907. She undertook freelance design work, producing catalogues and magazine covers.

A member of the Society of Women Painters from 1919, she held various positions for several years and contributed to each of its annual exhibitions from 1921. She painted in oils and watercolour. her subjects included children, landscapes and genre paintings. She was the first president of the Women's Industrial Art Society from 1934, and received the King George VI Coronation Medal in 1937.

She died on 11 July 1976 at Normanhurst, Sydney, New South Wales, and was cremated.

A retrospective exhibition of her work, "Frank Payne: The Forgotten Artist" was held at the Redland Art Gallery in Queensland, Australia in 2011.
