= Philip E. Muskett =

Australian physician, health reformer and writer (1857–1909)

Philip Edward Muskett
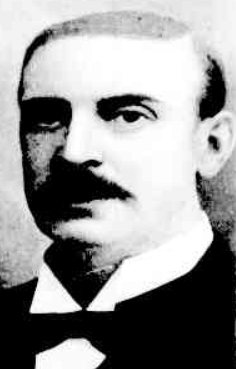
- Born: 5 February 1857; Collingwood, Melbourne
- Died: 25 August 1909 (aged 52); Sydney
- Occupations: Physician, writer

Philip Edward Muskett (5 February 1857 – 25 August 1909) L.R.C.P., L.R.C.S was an Australian physician, health reformer and writer. He opposed excessive meat and tea consumption and recommended eating more fish, fruit and vegetables.

== Biography ==
Muskett was born at Collingwood, Melbourne. He was educated at Melbourne Model School and Wesley College. In 1877, he studied medicine at the University of Melbourne and took further medical studies in Glasgow and Edinburgh, Scotland. In 1885, he took up private practice and most of his patients were children as he focused on infant health. His authored books on paediatrics that went through many editions and were positively reviewed.

In 1888, Muskett became a licentiate of the Royal Colleges of Physicians and of Surgeons, Edinburgh. He later returned to Australia and was Resident Medical Officer at Melbourne Hospital. He worked at Sydney Hospital from 1882 and within a year became Medical Superintendent of the quarantine station and Honorary Surgeon. He was Medical Officer and Honorary Surgeon to the Royal Agricultural Society of New South Wales. Muskett died at the age of 52, from heart failure.

== The Art of Living in Australia ==
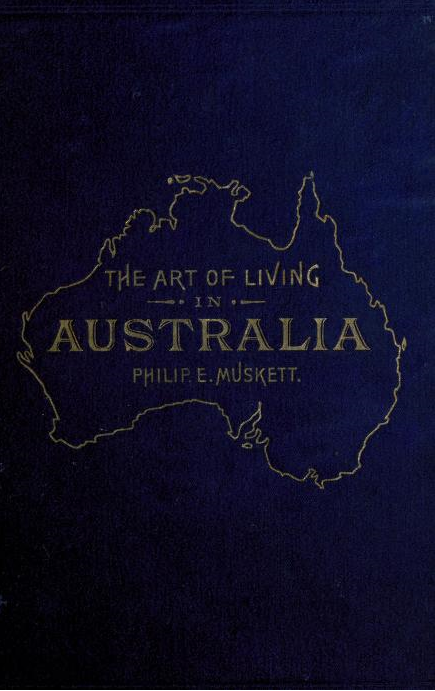
The Art of Living in Australia, 1873

Muskett is best known for his book The Art of Living in Australia, published in 1873. Muskett's dietary advice was for the Australian population to eat more fish, salads and vegetables whilst reducing their meat intake. The book condemned the food-habits of Australians, their meat-eating three times a day and excessive beer and tea consumption. He noted how the consumption of butcher's meat and tea was in enormous excess, and was paralleled nowhere else in the world and how deep-sea fisheries were not developed. Muskett wrote that "consumption of butcher's meat and tea is enormously more than any common sense requirements" and an "injurious amount of meat" was eaten "to the exclusion of far more needed nourishment."

Muskett argued that tea in excess "causes severe functional derangement of the digestive organs, and prejudicially affects the nervous system." He advised people to drink wine with their meals instead of tea. He recommended a diet that included fruit and salads but for this to happen, market gardening was required. His ideas were not popular amongst city dwellers because very few vegetables were commercially cultivated. Muskett compared the climate of Europe to Australia and suggested they were very similar so the diet should resemble that part of the world. Muskett was concerned that Australians consumed ten times the amount of meat than Italians do but both live in a similar climate. Muskett's diet favoring fruit, fish, vegetables and wine is a variant of the Mediterranean diet, proposed years later.

Muskett also promoted health advice in relation to clothing, exercise and hygiene. His advice was sometimes impractical to follow such as his belief that one should walk "not less than six or eight miles a day", before retiring to their bedroom.

== Selected publications ==
- The Health and Diet of Children in Australia (1888)
- Prescribing and Treatment in the Diseases of Children (1891)
- The Art of Living in Australia (1893, includes recipes by Harriet Wicken)
- The Book of Diet (1898)
- The Diet of Australian School Children and Technical Education (1899)
- Illustrated Australian Medical Guide (1903, 1909)
- The Attainment of Health (1908)

== See also ==
- G. Cooke Adams
