= Normand Baker =

Australian artist

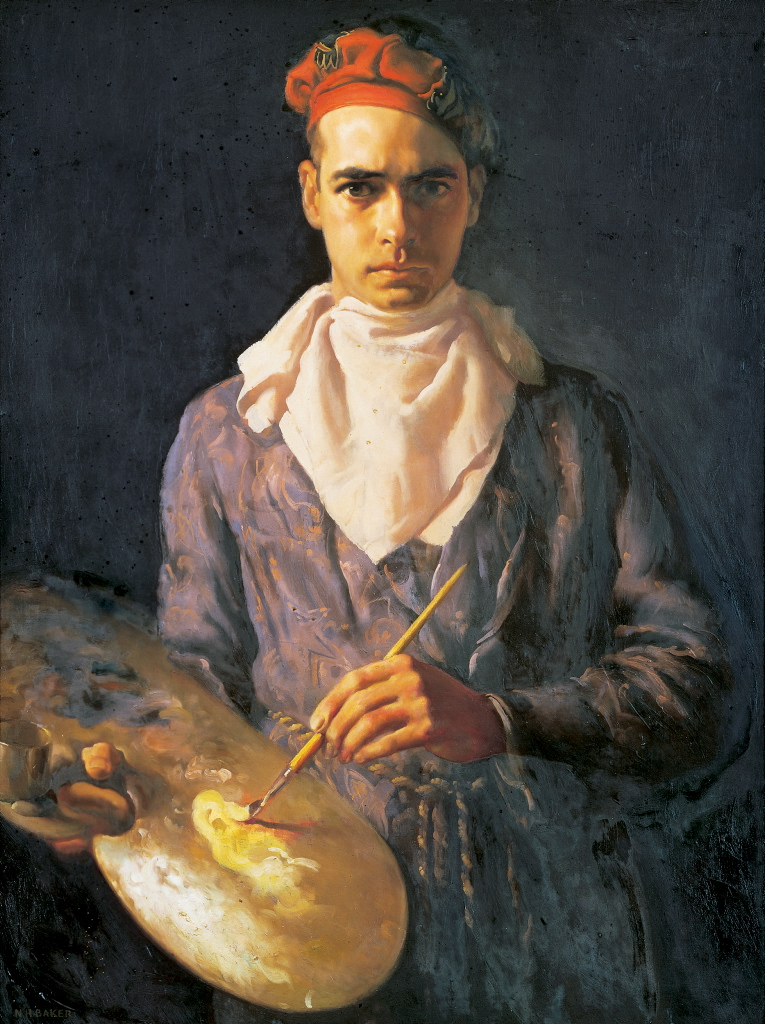
Self-portrait, 1937

Normand Henry Baker (9 July 1908 – 24 May 1955) was an Australian artist who won the Archibald Prize in 1937 with a self-portrait.

He was born in the suburb of Summer Hill in Sydney on 9 July 1908. He won the Archibald Prize when he was 29, which made him the youngest ever winner of the prize. He painted portraits, many of them self-portraits, as well as scenes of circuses and markets. He was also an Archibald Prize Finalist in 1946, again with a self-portrait.

Awards
Preceded by W B McInnes	Archibald Prize; 1937 for Self Portrait	Succeeded by Nora Heysen
