= Myra Cocks =

Australian painter and illustrator

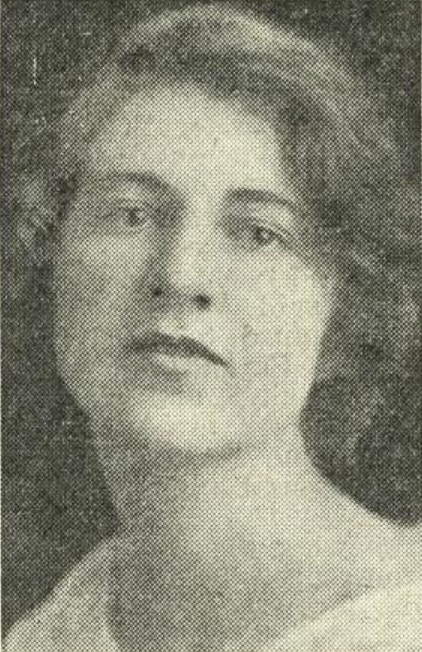
Myra Cocks in 1929

Myra Cocks (29 March 1893 – 9 June 1940) was an Australian painter and illustrator active between 1920–1931. She was the daughter of John Williams Cocks, a partner at a family legal firm in Sydney.

== Biography ==
Cocks initially trained at Julian Ashton's Art School in The Rocks, Sydney, from 1920 to 1924. Thereafter Cocks moved in 1925 to London, England UK. She studied under Henry Tonks at the Slade School of Fine Art from 1926 to 1929. In 1927–1929 she also reportedly trained at Heatherley's, the Edmund J. Blair Leighton Design School, and the Chelsea Polytechnic.

Her works were exhibited at least three times within her lifetime. First, from 13–28 February 1920 in the Julian Ashton Exhibition at the NSW Education Department's Art Gallery. Then in 1921 and 1924, both at Anthony Horderns' Fine Art Gallery, Sydney.

Cocks died in Sydney on 9 June 1940.

=== Posthumous Exhibition ===
In March – April 1995 Cocks' work was exhibited as part of the 'Women hold up half the sky' show at the National Gallery of Australia, Canberra. The show formed part of the National Women’s Art Exhibition, a series of independent shows in 1995 held across Australia to commemorate the 20th Anniversary of the International Women’s Year.
