= Bernice E. Edwell =

Australian artist (1880–1962)

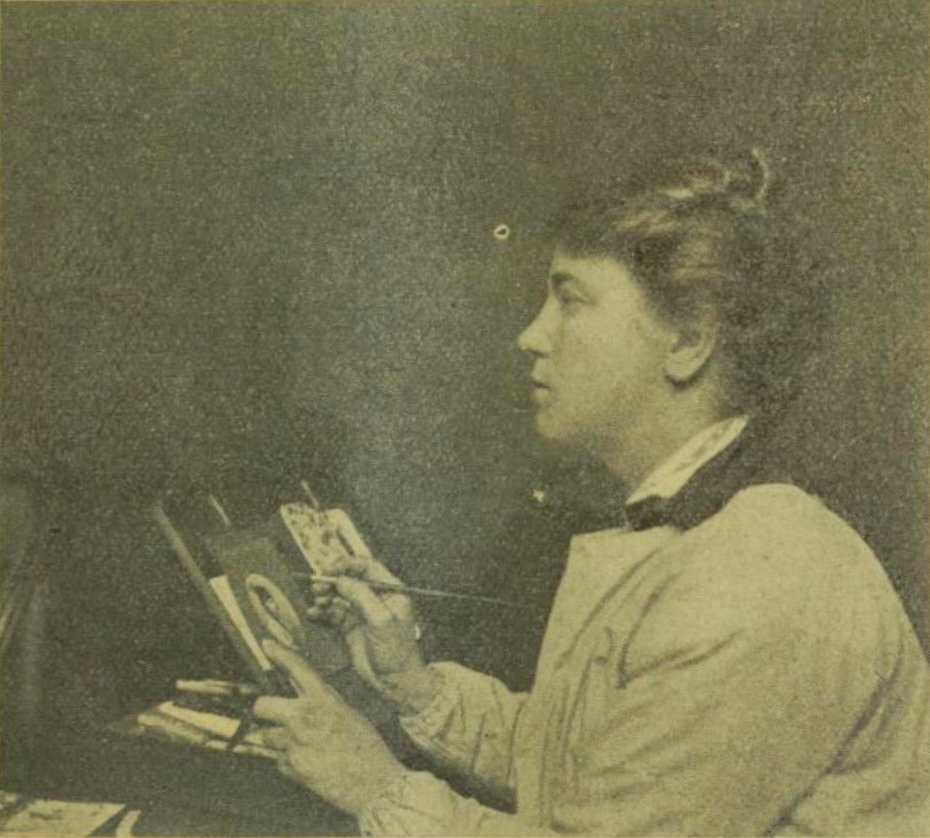
- Edwell painting a miniature
- Born: 11 May 1880; Newbury, Berkshire, United Kingdom
- Died: 1962 (aged 81–82); Sydney, New South Wales, Australia
- Known for: Painting

Bernice E. Edwell (1880–1962), was an Australian painter specialising in miniatures. She was a founding member of the Sydney Society of Women Painters and the Twenty Melbourne Painters Society.

== Biography ==
Edwell was born on 11 May 1880 in Newbury, England. She was the half-sister of Mary Edwell-Burke. Her family moved to Sydney, Australia when she was a child.

She studied at the Royal Art Society of New South Wales, where she was taught by Frank P. Mahony. She also travelled to Paris where she studied at the Académie Colarossi for around 16 months between 1899 and 1900, sharing a studio flat with Bertha Merfield.

Edwell established herself in Sydney, then Melbourne as a miniaturist. She won first prize for two of her miniatures at the Women's Work Exhibition at Melbourne in 1907. The Art Gallery of New South Wales purchased one of the winning paintings, with the other by the exhibition's President, Lady Northcote (wife of the Governor-General of Australia).

In 1910 Edwell was involved in the creation of the New South Wales Society of Women Painters. The same year they held their first exhibition displaying the work of 57 women. From 1908 to 1912 Edwell exhibited at The Society of Arts and Crafts of NSW. She also exhibited her miniatures in Adelaide in 1914 and again in 1920. In 1919 Edwell was a founding member of the Twenty Melbourne Painters Society.

Along with several solo shows in Melbourne from 1915 through 1934, Edwell was included in a 1923 group show with A.M.E. Bale and Jo Sweatman at the Melbourne Athenaeum.

Her work is held in the National Gallery of Victoria, National Gallery of Australia, Art Gallery of New South Wales and the Castlemaine Art Museum.

Edwell died in 1962 in Sydney.
