= James Muir Auld =

Australian artist

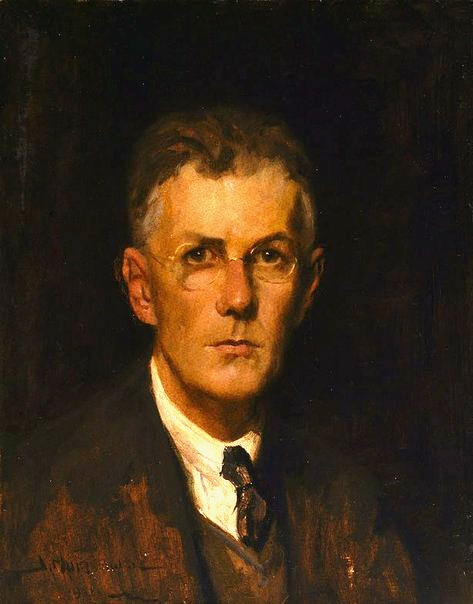
Self-portrait (1928)

James Muir Auld (19 June 1879 – 8 June 1942) was an Australian artist. His works are signed J. Muir Auld. Auld was born in Ashfield, New South Wales, third son of Presbyterian minister, Reverend John Auld (–1912) and his wife, Georgina née Muir. Auld attended Ashfield Public School and later, Sydney Grammar School. He worked as a clerk for the Ashfield Borough Council and enrolled in night classes in drawing at Ashfield Technical School. He spent spare time drawing and sketching the foreshores of Sydney Harbour.

== Artistic career ==
In 1909 he travelled to London to study the work of English painters, returning to Australia around 1911. On 1 July 1914 Auld married a divorcee Maggie Kate Kane, née Bell.

In 1917 The Broken Vase was bought by the National Art Gallery of New South Wales. At about this time, they also purchased a portrait of the poet Roderic Quinn. He joined the Society of Artists, Sydney about 1920 and frequently exhibited with it. In the 1920s, he joined the well-known commercial art firm, Smith and Julius, and illustrated several books.

Auld spent much time at Thirlmere, New South Wales in the final years of his life, continuing to create art. Winter Morning was awarded the Wynne Prize in 1935. Auld had three one-man exhibitions at the Macquarie Galleries, Sydney, in 1928, 1936 and 1938, and had also exhibited in London and Paris. Working with a palette knife, by 1938 he was expressing himself in a more delicate way with brushes.

He was a foundation member of the Australian Academy of Art in 1938.

== Death and legacy ==
Auld recalled the impact of the 1930s Great Depression caused him the 'desolation of his soul', at Dee Why, where there were no buyers with money for his pictures. At this time, tubercular trouble gave him a poor outlook of living only three months more. It was his brother-in-law, solicitor Frederick H. Greaves who then acquired the four-room 'shack' at Thirlmere for Auld, who took up an artist-hermit existence.

Auld died of tuberculosis on 8 June 1942, survived by daughter Thelma. He was known as 'reserved and sensitive and honest'.

Auld is represented in the Sydney, Adelaide, Brisbane and Manly galleries.

== Works ==
Auld drew the covers for two anthologies, 'Fair girls' (1914) and 'Gray horses' (1914), of Scottish-Australian poet and bush balladeer Will H. Ogilvie (1869–1963).

For the Archibald Prize, Auld made several submissions:

- 1922, a characteristic portrait of poet Roderic Quinn. This was one of the Prize's runner-ups;
- 1923, a portrait of New Zealand pianist Frank Hutchens, in evening dress. The portrait was technically satisfying. Hutchens was also depicted in flannels by another artist. Auld also submitted a self-portrait but had a rather drab scheme;
- 1924, portrait of caricaturist George Finey, which was considered rather lifeless compared to many of Auld's other works; and
- 1928 prize, a self-portrait.

His best works were considered to include 'Skydrift-Thirlmere' (1942), 'Cloudlands' (1942), 'Cloud Shadows' (1941), and 'Autumn Day' (1941), and also 'Bushland Peace' and the earlier paintings, 'Winter Morning', 'Thirlmere Landscape' and an excellent portrait of a young girl.

== Selected paintings ==
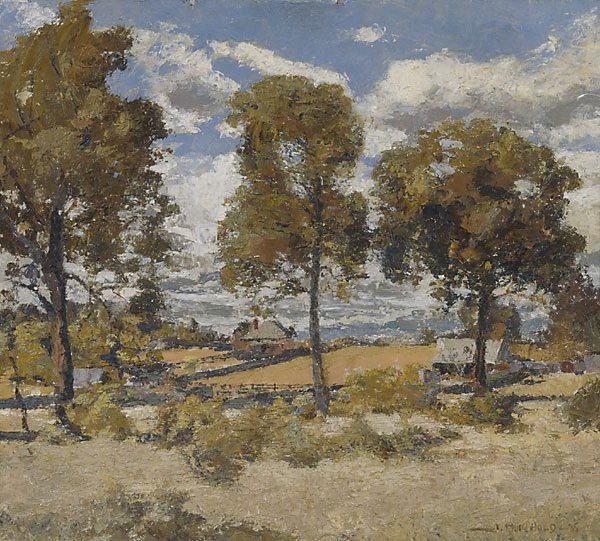
Winter Morning

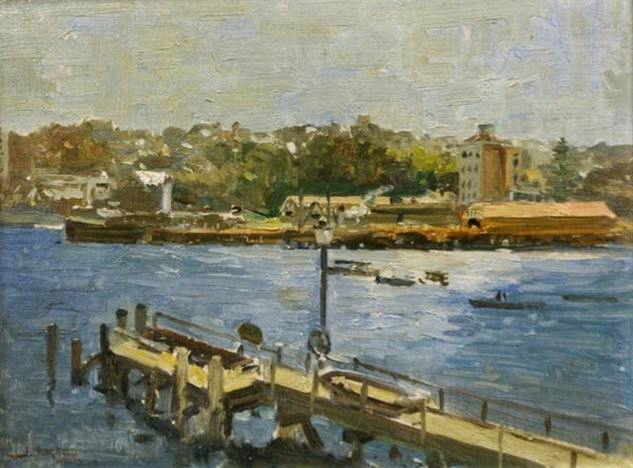
Manly, New South Wales

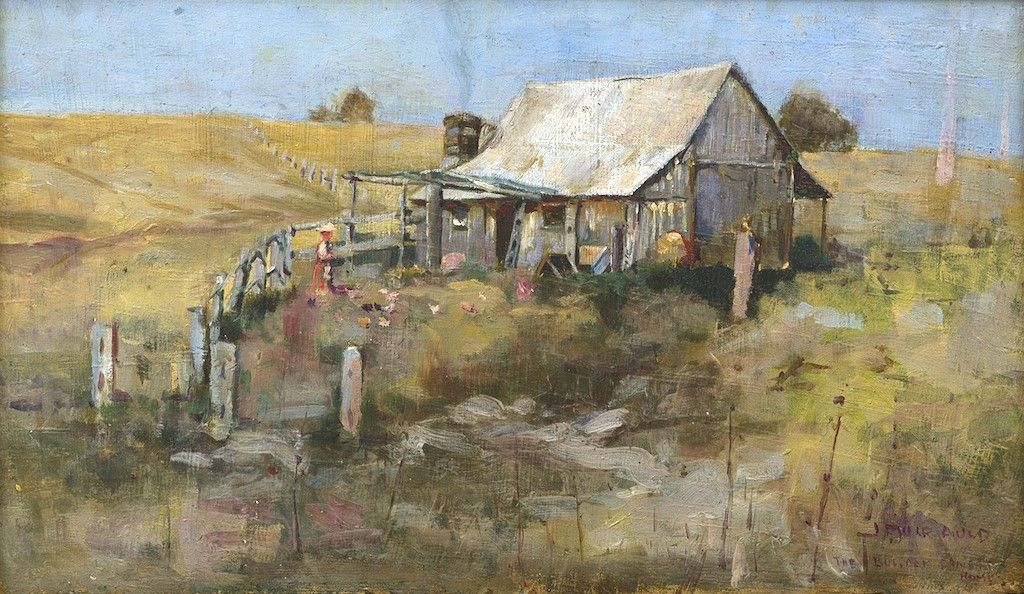
The Bullock Driver's Home

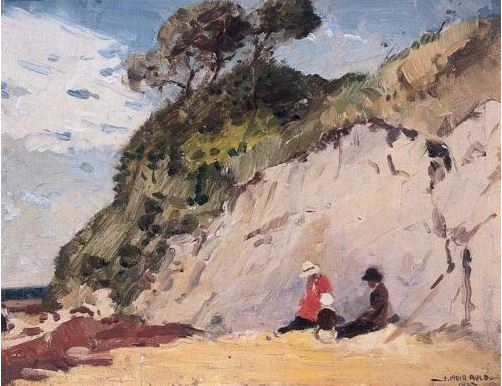
At the Seaside
