= Hulda Marshall =

Australian artist (1861–1938)

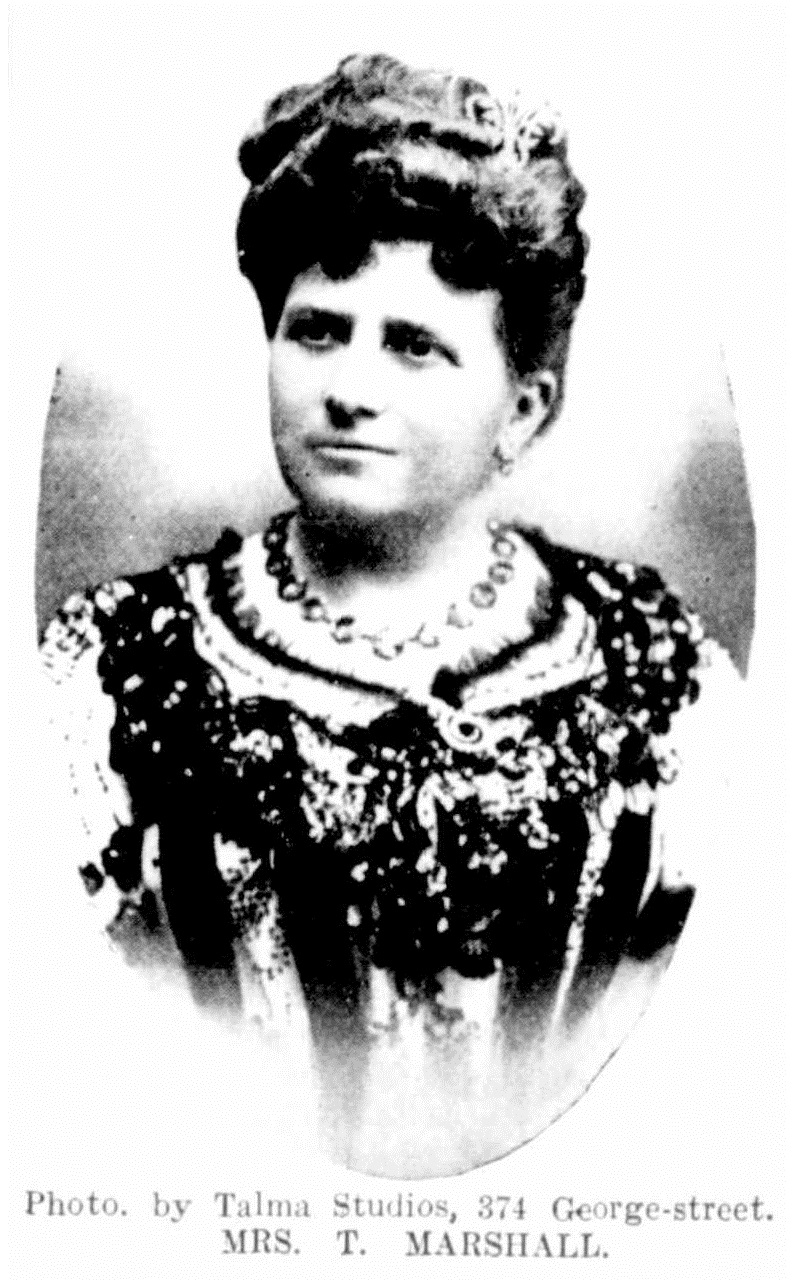
Hulda Marshall, Danish born Australian artist (1861–1938)

Hulda Marshall (born Hulda Olivia Agt Jorgensen, also known as Hulda Ulivia Agt Jorgensen, Mrs Tom Marshall, Mrs T Marshall, Hilda Marshall) (born 7 Sep 1861 Fredericksburg, Copenhagen, Denmark - died 30 July 1938 North Sydney, New South Wales, Australia) was an artist, arts patron and philanthropist.

== Early life ==
Hulda and her older sister, Nicoline Anna Vilhelmine Jorgensen (born 1859), were the children of Marie Vilhelmine Schumann and Hans Peter Jorgensen.

Marie, also known by her second name, Vilhelmine, was not married to Jorgensen. Her husband was in fact Frederik Christian Frederiksen. Frederik was a sailor, who had gone to America and stayed there, leaving Vilhelmine to care for his son, Lauritz (from a former partner), and their own two sons, Valdemar and Henrik.

On 1 July 1862, Hulda’s mother left Denmark to resume married life with her husband in America. She took Valdemar and Henrik with her, leaving behind Lauritz, Nicoline and Hulda. Frederik’s son, Lauritz, aged twelve, was put in a government orphanage; Nicoline Anna, 3 years old, was fostered out; Hulda, 9 months old, was left with a maternal aunt and uncle to be raised. Hulda’s mother had 3 more children with her husband Frederik, before dying of typhoid in New York, America in 1879.

When Hulda was fourteen and Nicoline Anna was sixteen, they left Denmark to migrate to New Zealand, travelling first from Copenhagen to Hamburg, thence from Hamburg to Wellington, New Zealand. Both girls listed their occupation as ‘servant’.

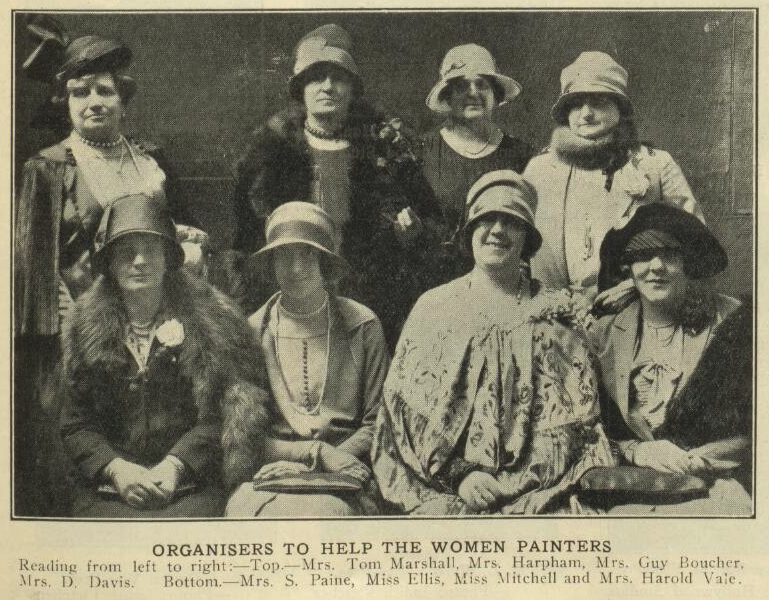
Mrs Tom Marshall (top left), artist, art patron and supporter of women painters in Australia

Hulda ultimately moved from New Zealand to Australia, and on 31 October 1888 she married Thomas Marshall, at St Mary’s Anglican Church, Waverley, in Sydney. Thomas Marshall was a solicitor, and the son of a wealthy colonial family headed by Joseph Marshall and Esther Stockdale. Hulda was included in the Marshall family’s entry in Burke’s Colonial Gentry of 1891, recorded as the wife of Thomas Marshall, and the daughter of Wilhelmine Schuman and Hans Peter Jorgensen. Hulda and Tom did not have any children.

== Career ==
As a watercolour and oils artist, a member of the Royal Art Society, the Strathfield Sketch Club, the Society of Women Painters, and a contributor to the Women's Work Exhibition (Sydney and Melbourne 1907), Hulda exhibited extensively from the late 1800s to 1930.

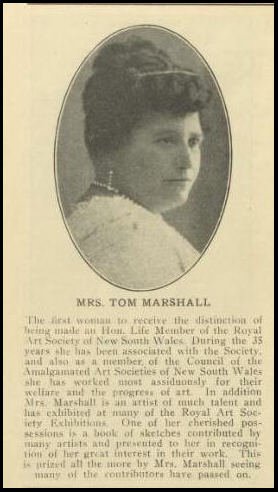
Mrs Tom Marshall, Danish born Australian artist and art patron

A well-known patron of the arts in Sydney, her role was recognised in 1929, along with that of her solicitor husband, Thomas Marshall, when they were made life-long members of the Royal Art Society, along with Dame Eadith Walker and Dame Nellie Melba.

== Artistic development ==
Hulda cited the Danish Art School of her homeland as the foundation of her artistic style.

She continued to develop her oil painting and watercolour skills in Australia, specialising in landscapes of the plein air school. The studio in her home had sketches of harbour, coastal, mountain and ocean scapes, hanging from the ceiling to the floor.

Hulda studied under Alfred Coffey, who opened the Music and Art Salon in 177 Pitt St, Sydney on 15 Aug 1903. She exhibited two of her oil paintings, views of Tasmania, at the first exhibition held there in September 1903. She also studied under William Lister Lister, who taught at the Strathfield Sketch Club, where he was president, and where her work was often exhibited. Her watercolour style was said to exhibit the softness which is characteristic of this medium.

A keen traveller, both within Australia, and overseas, Hulda recorded the natural world wherever she went, as evidenced from the titles of her art works – locations from Queensland to Tasmania, from New Zealand to Java, Japan, Manilla and Rabaul.

Two of her works are The Coaster’s Retreat (watercolour) and Their Weary Way They Homeward Plod, Through Bracken and Through Bush (oil) which were recognised and reproduced (in black and white) in the Royal Art Society’s publication 100 Best Pictures of the Royal Art Society's Exhibition 1906. When William Lister Lister was interviewed in 1906 regarding a 'thinning of the ranks' of artists, with a number of them leaving to work overseas, he listed many noteworthy artists, Mrs Tom Marshall among them, who would continue to produce good exhibitions for the Royal Art Society.

In 1907 Hulda's profile was raised as an exhibiting artist, a supporter of the Art Society and philanthropist, when she helped to organise the First Australian Exhibition of Women's Work, held in Sydney and then Melbourne. Her work as an artist was also recognised in Fifty Years of Australian Art 1879-1929 where she was included in the list of significant European artists of New South Wales during this period.

Besides showing her work in exhibitions, Hulda often contributed artworks to fundraisers such as The Great Australian Fair of 1897, which was held to raise money to build St Mary’s Cathedral in Sydney.

She is represented in the Art Gallery, Denmark, and was represented in the Manly Art Gallery and Museum, New South Wales with the watercolour Rabaul until it was deaccessioned in 1992.

== Arts patron and philanthropist ==
Hulda worked as a fundraiser for the arts, with money raised by her Art Society Annual Balls, conversaziones, and ‘at homes’ being used to buy art works for the Art Gallery of New South Wales. Hulda was presented with an album of sketches done by her artist contemporaries, in gratitude for her interest in their work.

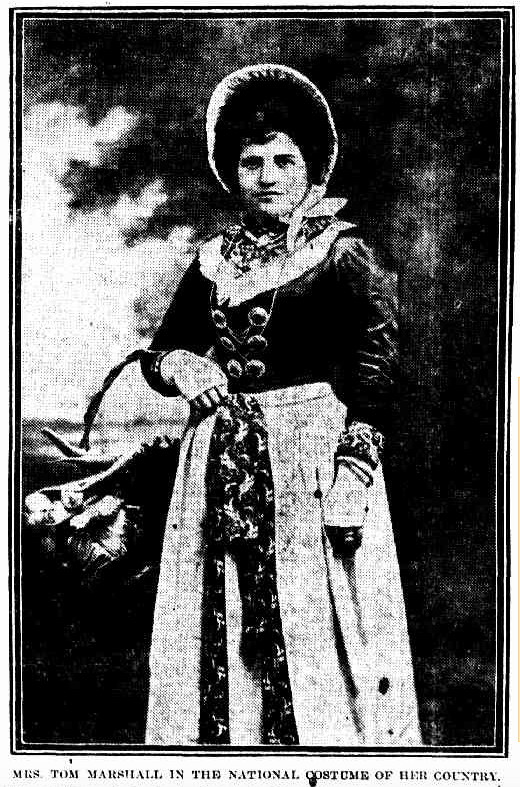
Hulda Marshall in national dress of Denmark

Hulda and Tom’s legacy was formalised in 1929 with their gift to the Art Gallery of a property in Sydney, with income derived each year being directed to the purchase of new art works. This was the Marshall Bequest, also variously referred to as the Marshall Bequest Fund, the Marshall Trust, the Marshall Gift, the Marshall Gift Fund, and the Mr and Mrs Tom Marshall Gift Fund. The Marshall Collection in the NSW Art Gallery catalogue lists over 150 art works.

Outside the art world, Hulda was one of the 'wheelwomen' of Sydney who met in 1895 at the suffragette/feminist-friendly venue of Mr Quong Tart’s sitting room, for the inaugural meeting of the Sydney Ladies Cycling Club. It was quite revolutionary for women to be riding bicycles at this time.

Hulda was also a keen yachtswoman. In 1906, for example, she piloted the Marshalls’ yacht, 'Nanoya', in the Squadron Ladies' Yacht Race, which she won.

In September 1901, Hulda, dressed in traditional Danish costume, was in charge of the bachelor's stall at the Skandinavian fete, held in Sydney Town Hall, a rallying cry to all Skandinavians in Sydney, to raise money for a cot at the Children's Hospital, Glebe. She wore a black satin bonnet lined with quilted blue satin, a blue apron over her black satin dress, a kerchief with a silver fringe, and streaming ribbons of Danish woven silk.

In 1921 Hulda travelled to Denmark with her husband Tom, and close friend Sheila Payne, as part of a grand tour of Britain and Europe, visiting the famous art centres of the 'old world'.

== Legacy ==
Her enduring legacy is the Marshall Bequest, which she and her husband Thomas Marshall established in 1929, for the purpose of acquiring art works for the Art Gallery of New South Wales. Thomas Marshall was a trustee of the gallery (known then as The National Art Gallery of New South Wales) from 1903 to 1935. The bequest continues to perform this function, more than 90 years later. Hulda was widowed in 1935. She commissioned two stained glass panels for St Thomas’ Church, North Sydney, where she and Tom had worshipped for many years, to be memorials for Tom and herself.

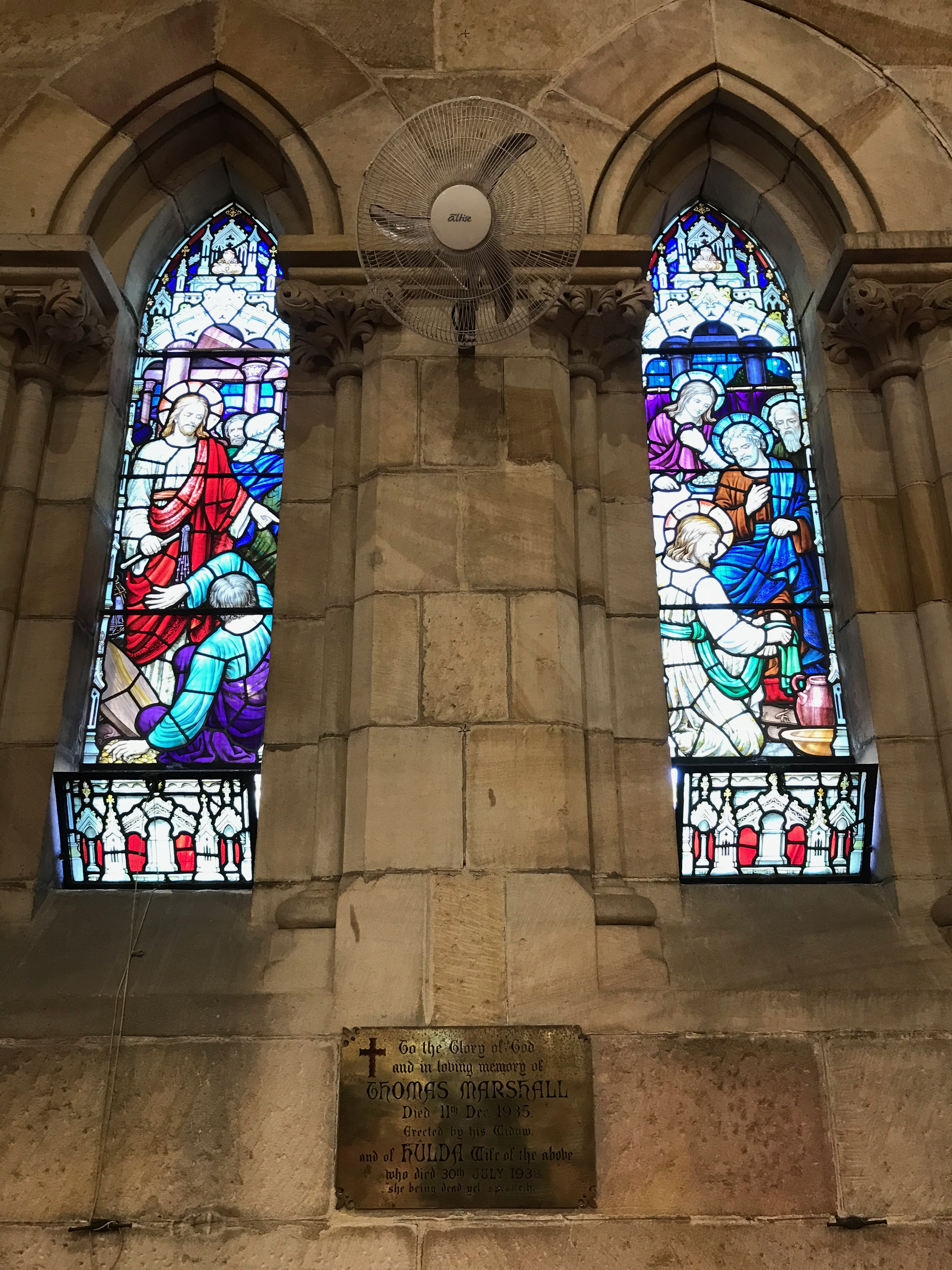
Two panelled stained glass windows in St Thomas' Church, North Sydney

Hulda died at her home, "Tallangatta", Wyagdon Street, North Sydney, on 30 July 1938. Her ashes were scattered with Thomas Marshall’s, according to her wishes, into the ocean near Waverley Cemetery, where a number of members of the Marshall family are buried.

Besides the Marshall Bequest, her estate was considerable. She left 6 cottages to her chauffeur, income for life for her housekeeper, bequests to the Royal Alexandra Hospital for Children, St Thomas' Church, the RSPCA, the Home for Horses, the Far West Children’s Home, and the Deaf, Dumb and Blind Institute. A cousin in Denmark received 3,000 pounds; her friend Stella Payne Baxter inherited her house with its contents and other properties.

The bronze plaque which is beneath the stained glass panels which Hulda had installed in St Thomas’ Church, North Sydney, reads:

To the Glory of God/ and in loving memory of/ THOMAS MARSHALL/ Died 11th Dec 1935/ Erected by his Widow/ And of HULDA Wife of the above/ Who died 30th July 1938/ “she being dead yet speaketh”.

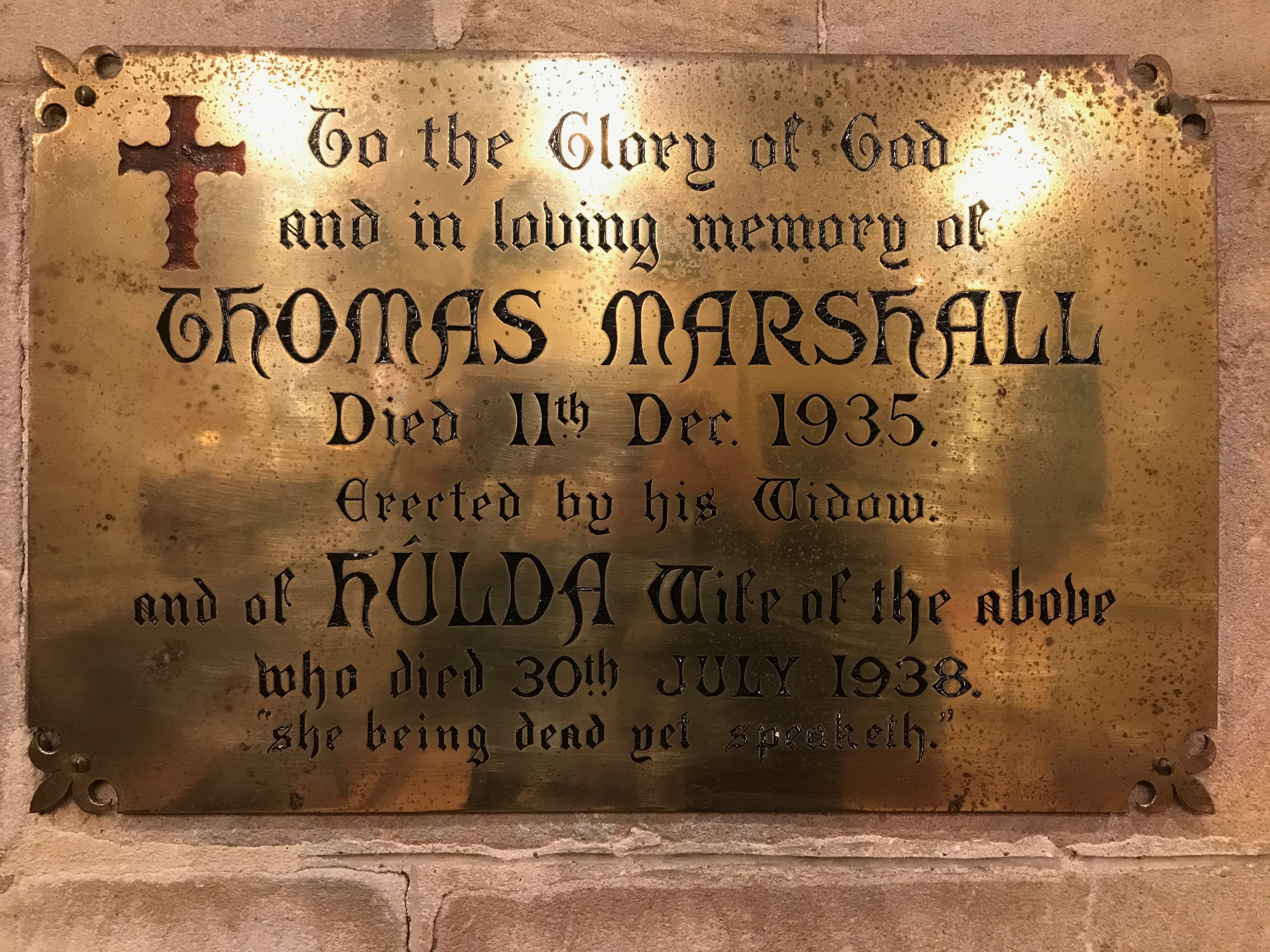
Brass plaque beneath the memorial stained glass windows in St Thomas', North Sydney

== Gallery ==
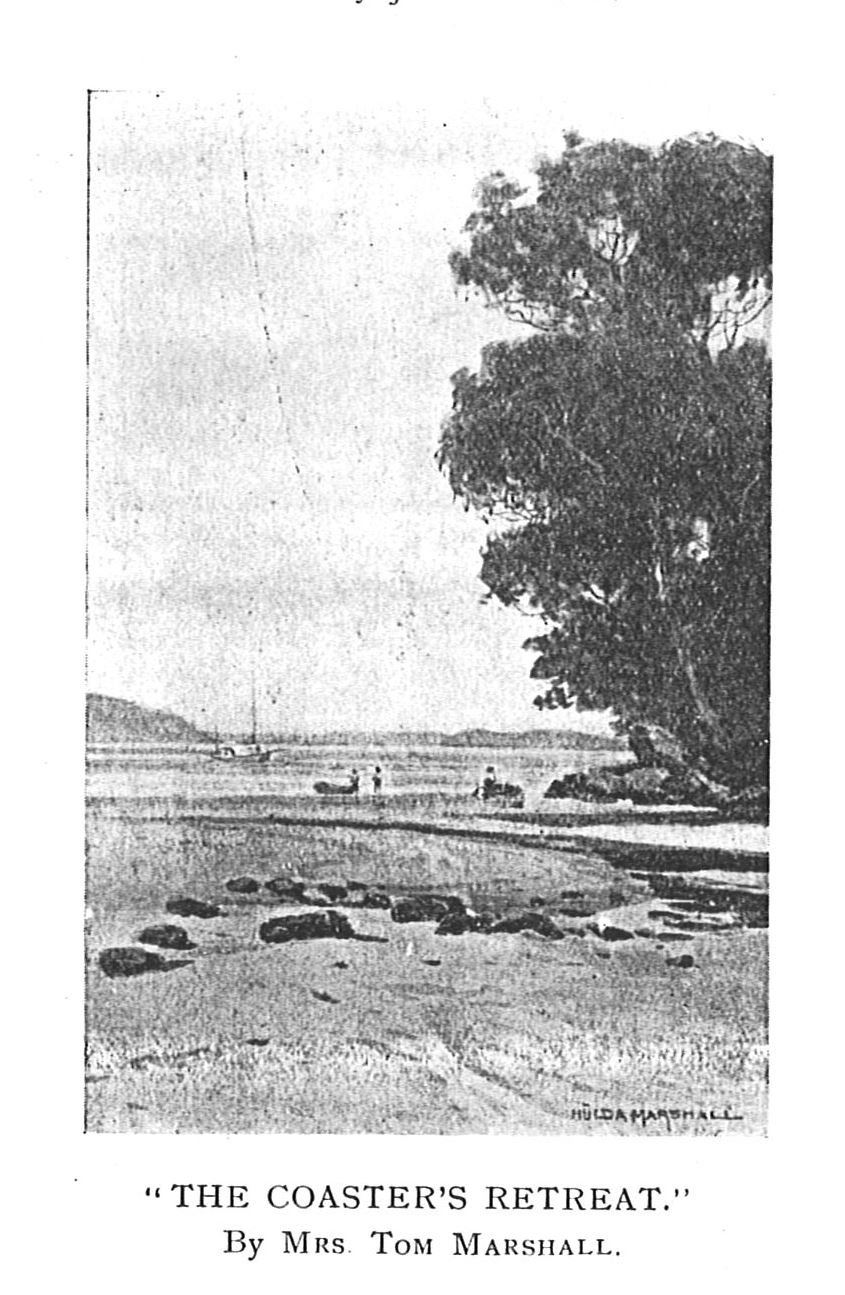
'The Coaster's Retreat', Hulda (Jorgensen) Marshall

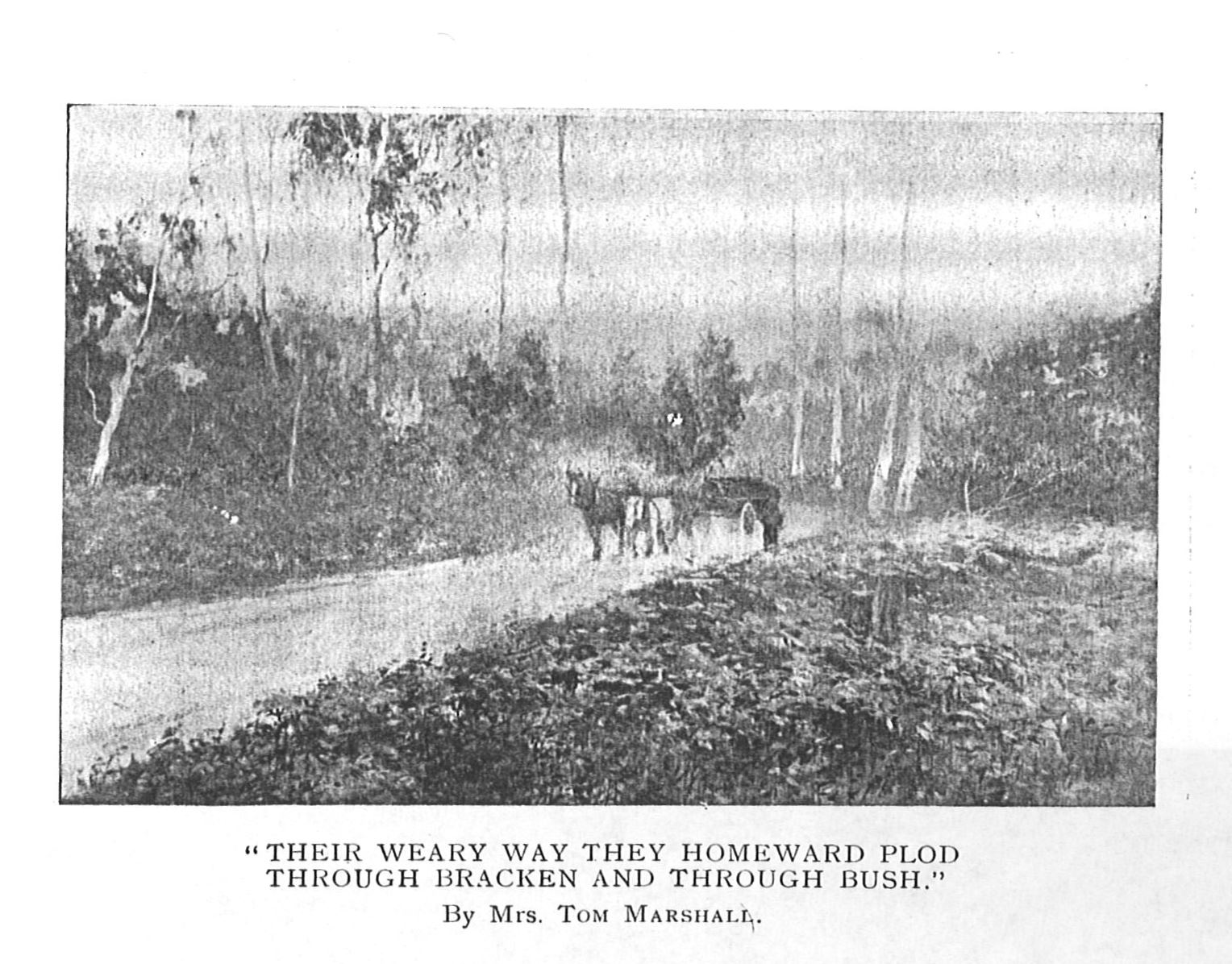
'Their Weary Way they Homeward Plod Through Bracken and Through Bush' Hulda (Jorgensen) Marshall

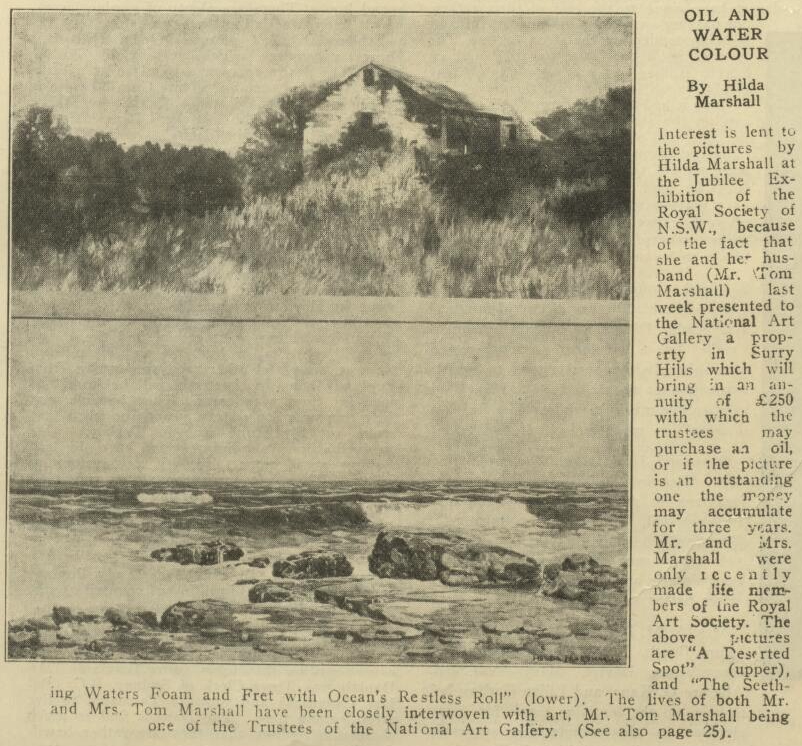
Hulda Marshall aka Mrs Tom Marshall - 'A Deserted Spot' and 'The Seething Waters Foam and Fret with Ocean's Restless Roll'
