= Harold Abbott (artist) =

Australian painter

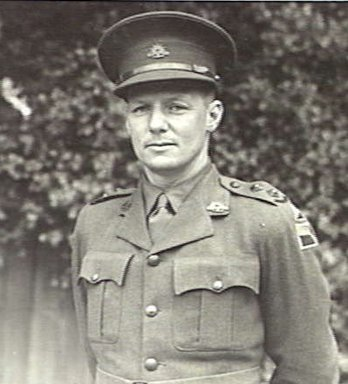
Lt. Harold Abbott, 1943

Harold Frederick Abbott (14 June 1906 – 8 June 1986) was an Australian portrait painter, an official war artist and an art teacher by profession.

== Life and career ==
Abbott was born in 1906 in the Sydney suburb of Strathfield, New South Wales. At the age of seventeen, he started studying part-time art at Sydney Art School. In 1931 he moved to London for two years to study at the Royal Academy, funded by the NSW Society of Artists Travelling Scholarship. In 1934–1940 he was a finalist in the Archibald Prize and in 1940 he won the Sulman Prize. In 1941 he enlisted in the AIF. In 1943 he was appointed a war artist in 2/9th Field Regiment with the rank of lieutenant.

For twenty years after the war, Abbott did little painting or exhibiting; he taught at the National Art School in Sydney, where he later became the head and State Supervisor of Art. Upon retirement in the late 1960s he returned to painting, but with a quite different style, and held 8 solo exhibitions.

Abbott died on 8 June 1986 (aged 79) in Sydney. His work is held in the collections of the National Gallery of Australia, the Art Gallery of New South Wales, the Australian War Memorial, and in various regional art galleries.

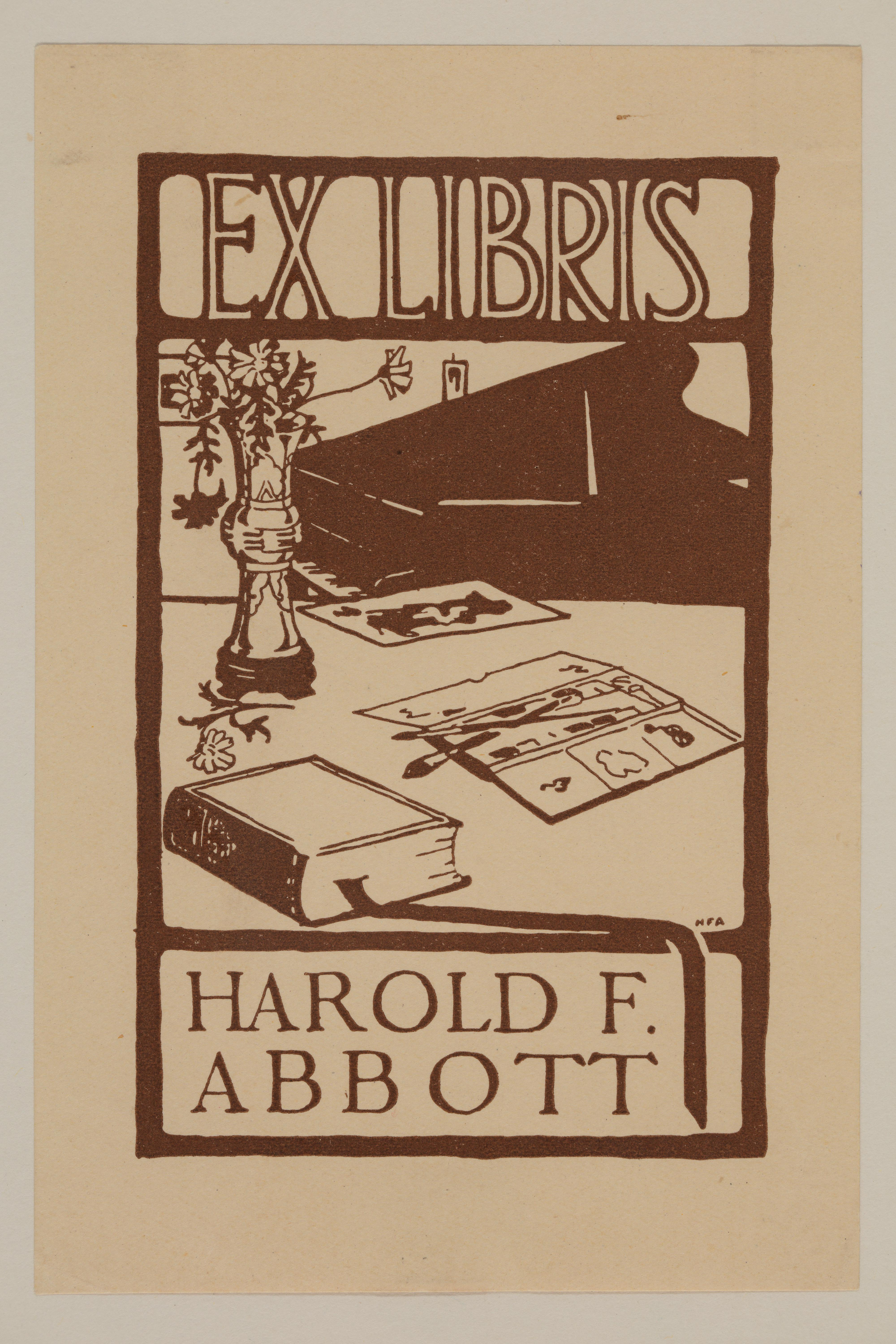
Ex libris (bookplate) of Harold F. Abbott, designed by himself

== Abbott's works in the Australian War Memorial Collection ==
Over 170 of Abbott's works are listed in the Australian War Memorial Collection. These include:

- Sergeant Leslie Ralph McCole
- Corporal William (old Bill) Green
- Sergeant Arthur Carson

== Finalist in the Archibald Prize ==
- 1934: Four works: Miss Ruth Waterhouse; Master Bruce Abbott; Rev. John Edwards, M.A. and J. Armstrong, Esq.
- 1935: Miss Susan Davies
- 1936: Three works: Miss Nancy Sinclair; The Hon. Mr Justice Boyce and Mrs Frank Hosking
- 1937: Self Portrait and runner up: Miss Jeanie Ranken
- 1938: Self Portrait
- 1939: Five works: Mrs C. de Burgh; Neil McNeill, Esq. [sic]; Robert Gillespie, Esq; Miss Margaret Murray and Mrs R. Abbott
- 1940: Dr W. Arundel Orchard
- 1943: Patient Awaiting Plastic Surgery
- 1945: Sgt. Reg Rattey
- 1946: Self-portrait
- 1950: George Lucas
- 1951: Jakovljevich Dushan

== Works in the Art Gallery of NSW ==
- recto: Old Italian verso: (seated female nude) (circa 1934)
- Miss Jeanie Ranken (1937)
- David (1950)

== Finalist in the Sir John Sulman Prize ==
- 1940: Winner: Vaucluse Interior
- 1950: The Brothers Gamack
