= Royal Art Society of New South Wales =

The Royal Art Society of New South Wales, or Royal Art Society of NSW, was established in 1880 as the Art Society of New South Wales by a group of artists including Arthur and George Collingridge, with the aim of creating an Australian school of painting, and separate from the NSW Academy of Art. Their first exhibition was held in the Garden Palace. In 1902 the Society merged with the Society of Artists and received royal assent from King Edward VII to add "Royal" to their name.

Over the years, the society gave tuition to and held exhibitions for artists such as Charles Conder, George Lambert, Sydney Long, Antonio Dattilo-Rubbo, Norman Lindsay, Hans Heysen, John Longstaff, Margaret Preston, W. Lister Lister, Elioth Gruner, and many others. It celebrated 140 years of existence in 2020. Patrons and artists were made life-long members, such as Hulda Marshall, Thomas Marshall, Dame Eadith Walker and Dame Nellie Melba.
