= Alice Jane Muskett =

Australian-born artist and author

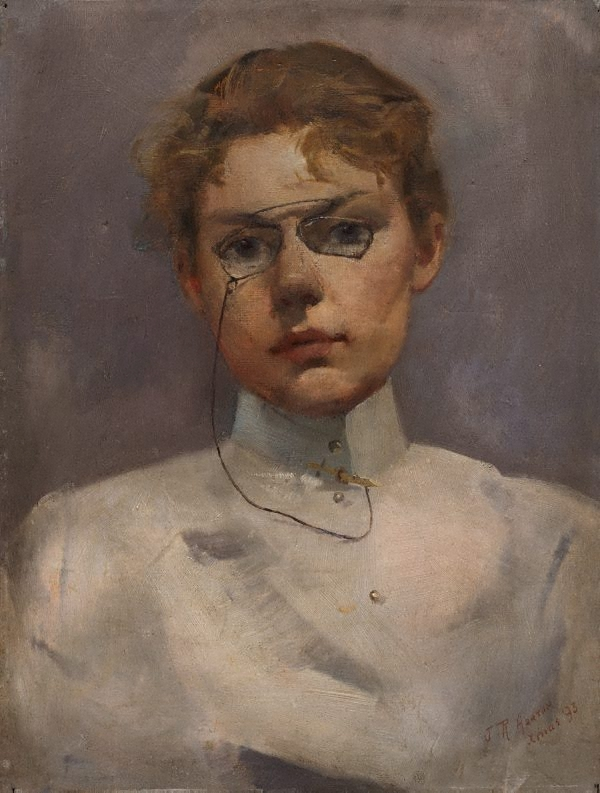
Portrait by Julian Ashton (1893)

Alice Jane Muskett (28 April 1869 – 17 July 1936) was an Australian-born artist and author. It is believed her picture of puritans accompanying her poem The Pillory (1905) was the first illustration by a woman to be published in The Bulletin.

== Early life and education ==
Alice Jane Muskett, born in Fitzroy, Victoria, was the only daughter of English bookseller Charles Muskett and his wife Phoebe, née Charlwood, daughter of printer and bookseller Arthur Charlwood. Alice's older brother by twelve years, Philip Edward Muskett, was a prominent physician and health reformer.

Phoebe maintained the family business after her husband's death in 1873 until 1885, when she took Alice to join Philip in Sydney. The Muskett siblings lived together on Elizabeth Street until Philip's death in 1909.

Alice Muskett was one of the first students of the influential Sydney Art School founded by English-born Australian artist Julian Ashton in 1890. He established Sydney's first life-class for women with Muskett as his second pupil. Ashton made three portraits of Muskett during their acquaintance. His 1893 study in oils of Alice in class wearing pince-nez spectacles and a white dress, and the portrait 'The Coral Necklet' (1901), are in the Art Gallery of New South Wales.

== Career as an artist ==
Muskett exhibited each year from 1890, first with the Art Society of New South Wales and then from 1895 with the Society of Artists, Sydney, her paintings reproduced in its catalogues.

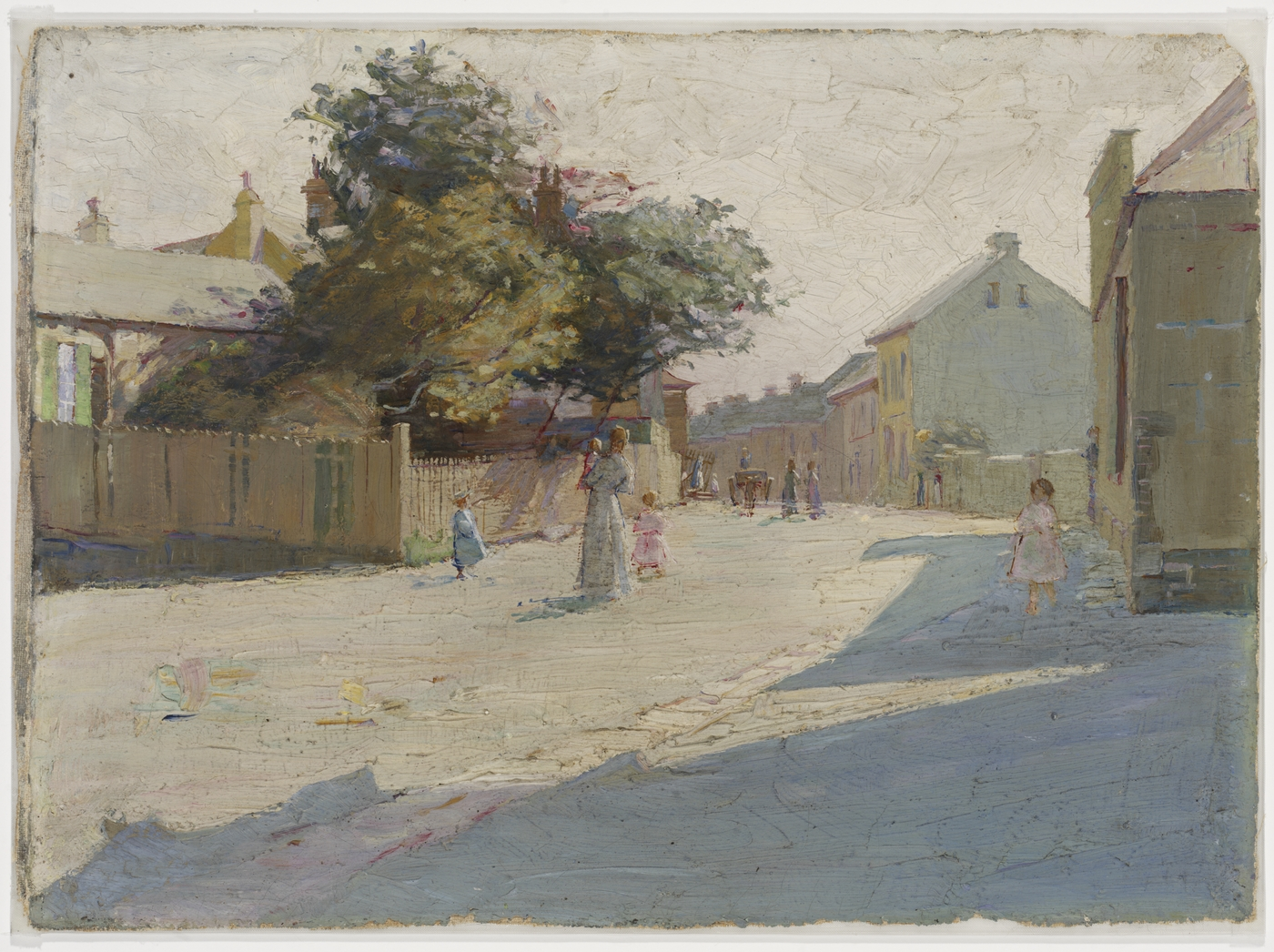
Alice J. Muskett, In Cumberland Street, c. 1902

Muskett then went on to study in Paris at the Académie Colarossi for several years between 1895 and 1898, during which time she exhibited at the Salon de la Société des Artistes Français. Her exhibits included Violets and Old Letters (still life in oils) and The Red Ribbon, a "remarkably strong" pastel of a dark-haired young girl. The 1898 Exhibition of Australian Art in London included her work.

'Study of Roses' (1898) and 'In Cumberland Street' (1902) were bought by the Art Gallery of New South Wales, before the latter was transferred to the State Library of NSW in 1920. 'In Cumberland Street' showed the artist's versatility in painting views portraying an idealised scene of city life in an area better known as a Sydney slum.

David Henry Souter, founder and president of the Society of Artists, Sydney, referred to Alice Muskett as "probably the most talented of our women painters" in 1909.

She shared a studio with Florence Rodway in Sydney in the years immediately prior to World War 1, involved in the Society of Women Painters.

Muskett Place, in the Canberra suburb of Conder, is named in her honour.

== Career as a writer ==
After Muskett's career as an artist had been established she began writing verse and short stories published in a range of newspapers in particular, The Sydney Mail, The Lone Hand and The Bulletin.

Using the pseudonym, 'Jane Laker', her maternal grandmother's name, she wrote a semi-autobiographical feminist novel set in Sydney in 1913, Among the Reeds (1933). It took the form of an intimate journal by a fictitious diarist over the period of the year. Dramatising women's conflicts over marriage and career, it is notable for being an early feminist piece of writing.

== See also ==
- Australian art
