= Violet Vimpany =

Australian painter, etcher and stonemason

- Born: 15 April 1886
- Died: 2 March 1979 (aged 92)
- Education: Hobart Technical College
- Known for: Painting, etching, stonemasonry
- Movement: Modernism

Violet Emma Vimpany (née Alomes, 15 April 1886 – 2 March 1979) was an Australian painter and etcher, and in later life also a master stonemason. She was an active member of, and regular exhibitor with, the Art Society of Tasmania. Her work is held in the permanent collection of the Tasmanian Museum and Art Gallery.

== Early life and education ==
Vimpany was born in 1886 in Forcett, Tasmania, one of eight children (four girls and four boys) of Walter Alomes and Emma Jane Parker. She studied art at Hobart Technical College in 1928 and 1931 to 1932, under the tutelage of Belgian-born Australian artist, Lucien Dechaineux.

== Career ==
During the 1930s Vimpany shared a studio at 76 Collins Street in Hobart with other women artists of the time, including Edith Holmes, Mildred Lovett, Ethel Nicholls, Florence Rodway, and Dorothy Stoner. It is presumed that during this time Holmes painted the artwork Portrait of Violet Vimpany (Masterpiece Fine Art Gallery Hobart).

From 1936 to 1939, when in her fifties, Vimpany regularly traveled from Hobart to Melbourne to study with Scottish-born Australian artist and art teacher, Max Meldrum. Her work became highly regarded and was exhibited in the 1939 exhibition, International Women: Painter, Sculptors, Gravers, held at the Riverside Museum (now the Master Building) in Manhattan, New York.

Vimpany was a council member of The Art Society of Tasmania from 1936 to 1952, and exhibited with them for over forty years (1932–1975). As a philanthropist and champion of women's rights, she was a member of the Hobart Soroptimist Club (changing to the Soroptimist International of Hobart in the 1970s) – an organisation which advocates for human rights, gender equality, and advancing the status of women.

Her husband died suddenly from a heart attack in 1945, and at the age of 60, she took over his stonemasonry business. Mastering the skills of the masonry trade, she successfully ran the business for over twenty years. Selling the business in 1969, she retired definitively in 1973, and in that same year was named one of Tasmania's ‘Women of Achievement’. In 2019, she was listed as one of 156 "Women who shaped Australian art".

She was honorary secretary of the National Council for Women from 1938 to 1940, elected president in 1945, and served as delegate for the NCW at UNRRA in 1945.

Violet Vimpany died on 2 March 1979, aged 92. She is buried at the Forcett Lewisham Cemetery in Tasmania.

=== Major exhibitions ===
- 1939 – International Women: Painter, Sculptors, Gravers, Riverside Museum (now the Master Building), New York
- 1932–1975 – various exhibitions with the Art Society of Tasmania

=== Personal life ===
She married Amos William Vimpany, the foremost stonemason of Hobart, and also a former student of Hobart Technical College. They had two daughters, Violet (‘Vi’) and Gwendolene (‘Gwen’).
