= List of museums in Tasmania =

This list of museums in Tasmania, Australia, contains museums that are defined for this context as institutions (including nonprofit organizations, government entities and private businesses) that collect and care for objects of cultural, artistic, scientific or historical interest and make their collections or related exhibits available for public viewing. Also included are non-profit art galleries and university art galleries.

Name	Location	Region	Type	Notes
Allport Library and Museum of Fine Arts	Hobart		Library	Part of the State Library of Tasmania, 19th century period rooms, changing exhibits of art and history from its collections
Australasian Golf Museum	Bothwell		Sport	website
Avoca Museum	Avoca		Local	Located in a historic school building
Bark Mill Museum	Swansea	North West	History	website, 19th century life
Bass & Flinders Centre	George Town	North	Maritime	website
Beaconsfield Mine & Heritage Centre	Beaconsfield	Northern	Mining	Former gold mine with buildings and equipment
Bligh Museum of Pacific Exploration	Adventure Bay		History	website, located on Bruny Island, specialised collection relating to various explorations in the South Pacific
Burnie Regional Art Gallery	Burnie	North West	Art	website,
Burnie Regional Museum	Burnie	North West	History	website, Features a Federation Street (complete with a saddler and boot maker's shop, a blacksmith's forge, printer, photographer and even a dentist), an extensive photographic collection and temporary exhibitions.
Carnegie Gallery	Hobart		Art	website, city art gallery
Cascades Female Factory	Hobart		Prison	Former Australian workhouse for female convicts in the penal colony of Van Diemen's Land
Channel Heritage Centre	Margate		Local	website, local history, industries, community life about the D'Entrecasteaux Channel surrounds
Clarendon House (Evandale, Tasmania)	Evandale	Northern	Historic house	website, operated by the National Trust of Australia
Cygnet Living History Museum	Cygnet	Huon Valley	History	Cygnet Living History Museum At Collections Australia
Deloraine and District Folk Museum	Deloraine		Local	information, local pioneer history
Design Centre Tasmania	Launceston	North	Art	website, area contemporary craft and design in wood
Derwent Valley Railway	New Norfolk		Railway	Heritage railway, currently not operational
Devonport Maritime Museum and Historical Society	Devonport	North West	Maritime	website
Devonport Regional Gallery	Devonport	North West	Art	website
Don River Railway	Don	North West	Railway	Heritage railway and museum
Eaglehawk Neck Historic Site	Eaglehawk Neck		Military	website, restored officer's quarters and remains of former fort for the Port Arthur penal settlement
Entally House	Hadspen		Historic house	Early 19th century estate house with collection of Regency furniture and fine silver, gardens, a greenhouse, a chapel, a coach house and stables
Forest EcoCentre	Scottsdale		Natural history	website, operated by Forestry Tasmania, forestry and natural history of forests
Franklin House (Launceston, Tasmania)	Launceston	Northern	Historic house	website, operated by the National Trust of Australia
Furneaux Museum	Flinders Island		Local	website
Galley Museum	Queenstown		Mining	Photographs and relics of the mining communities of the past
Geeveston Forest & Heritage Center	Geeveston		Forestry	Photographs, relics and interactive displays about early settlement and forestry in Far South Tasmania
Grote Reber Museum	Cambridge		Science	Life and work of astronomer Grote Reber, tour of the Mount Pleasant Radio Observatory
Home Hill	Devonport	North West	Historic house	website, operated by the National Trust of Australia, 20th century home of Prime Minister Joseph Lyons and Dame Enid Lyons
Huon Valley Apple and Heritage Museum	Grove		Agriculture	website, Tasmania 's apple industry
Imaginarium Science Centre	Devonport	North West	Science	website, hands-on science displays
John Elliott Classics Museum	Hobart		Archaeology	website, operated by the University of Tasmania, art and culture of ancient Egypt and Mesopotamia, Greece, Etruria and Rome
Lady Franklin Gallery	Lenah Valley	Local		website, Operated by The Art Society of Tasmania, which located to the premises in 1949.
Latrobe Courthouse Museum	Latrobe	North West	Local	website, operated by the National Trust of Australia, local history displays
Launceston Tramway Museum	Launceston	North	Transport	website, historic trams
Low Head Pilot Station Maritime Museum	Low Head		Maritime	website
Markree Museum	Hobart		Historic house	website, operated by the Tasmanian Museum and Art Gallery, exhibitions of Tasmanian history and period rooms, changing exhibitions featuring art and decorative arts
Maritime Museum of Tasmania	Hobart		Maritime	Tasmania's association with the sea, ships and shipbuilding
Mawson's Huts Replica Museum	Hobart		Arctic	A replica hut museum about Douglas Mawson and the Australasian Antarctic Expedition
Military Museum of Tasmania	Hobart		Military	Located within Anglesea Barracks
Museum of Old and New Art	Hobart		Art	Includes antiquities, modern and contemporary art
Narryna Heritage Museum	Hobart		Historic house	website, 19th century period wealthy merchant family's house
National Automobile Museum of Tasmania	Launceston	Northern	Transport	website, automobiles, motorcycles, Tasmanian Motor Sport Hall of Fame
Norfolk Plains Heritage Centre	Longford		Local	website, operated by the National Trust of Australia, local history displays, historic Masonic lodge
Oak Lodge (Richmond, Tasmania)	Richmond		Historic house	website, operated by the National Trust of Australia, features 19th century surgeon's office
Old Hobart Town	Richmond		Historic house	website, model village depicting life in Hobart as it was in the 1820s
Pearns Steam World	Westbury	North	Technology	website, steam engines, tractors, equipment and memorabilia
Penitentiary Chapel Historic Site	Hobart		Prison	Former maximum security prison for males and females with chapel and courts
Plimsoll Gallery	Hobart		Art	website, operated by the University of Tasmania, innovative local, national and international contemporary art and design
Port Arthur Historic Sites	Port Arthur		Open air	Includes a penitentiary, dock, church, hospital, 19th century period houses
Richmond Gaol	Richmond		Prison	
Runnymede (Hobart, Tasmania)	Hobart		Historic house	website, operated by the National Trust of Australia, 19th century whaling family's house
Queen Victoria Museum and Art Gallery	Launceston	North	Multiple	Includes colonial art, contemporary craft and design, Tasmanian history and natural history displays
Queen Victoria Museum and Art Gallery	Inveresk	North	Multiple	Tasmania's social and natural history including dinosaurs, railway transport, geology, local history
Salamanca Arts Centre	Hobart		Art	Includes several galleries
Salmon Ponds	Plenty	North	Natural history	website, trout hatchery, museum of trout fishing
Suzanne Charleston Gallery	Ulverstone	North West	Art Gallery	Small exclusive Art Gallery overlooking Leven River, fine art, photography, glass & timber creations, fabric designs, exquisite jewellery website
Tasman Historical Museum and Cafe	Taranna		History	Facebook site, café with local historical artefacts on display
Tasmanian Cricket Museum	Hobart		Sports	website, located in Bellerive Oval
Tasmanian Museum and Art Gallery	Hobart		Multiple	History of Tasmania through every era, geology, natural history, Tasmania's indigenous population, Antarctica, numismatic display, art gallery
Tasmanian Police Museum	Hobart		Tasmania Police	History of the Tasmanian police force, run by the Tasmania Police Historical Group
Tasmanian Transport Museum	Glenorchy		Transport	Railway equipment, buses, road vehicles, steam engines
Tasmanian Wool Centre	Ross		History	website, retail store, museum with local history exhibits and history of the Tasmanian wool industry
Tiagarra Aboriginal Culture Centre and Museum	Devonport	North West	Culture	information, history, cultures and art of Tasmanian Aboriginal people
University of Tasmania Galleries	Hobart, Launceston and Burnie		Art	information, works from the Fine Art Collection on exhibit in the Hobart's Plimsoll Gallery, the Academy Gallery in Launceston, and the Atrium Gallery at the Cradle Coast, and on each campus
Vintage Tractor Shed Museum	Westbury	North	Technology	information, restored vintage tractors and machinery
Waddamana Power Stations	Waddamana		Technology	Equipment and science behind the former power generating station
Watch House Museum	George Town	North	Prison	information, former prison and local history exhibits
Wooden Boat Centre	Franklin		Maritime	website, history of boatbuilding and water transport
Woodsdale Museum	Levendale	North	History	website, includes 19th century period house and historic school
Woolmers Estate	Longford		Open air	19th century farm estate including outbuildings, gardens
West Coast Heritage Centre	Zeehan	West	History	website, dedicated to the history and pioneers of the West Coast of Tasmania.

== See also ==
- List of museums in Australia
