= The Art Society of Tasmania =

Australian cultural organization

- Formation: 1884
- Founders: Louisa Swan; Maria Evans
- Founded at: Hobart, Tasmania
- Purpose: artistic culture and practice
- Headquarters: Lady Franklin Gallery; 268 Lenah Valley Road, Lenah Valley, Tasmania, Australia
- Website: artstas.com.au

The Art Society of Tasmania was founded as the Tasmanian Art Association in 1884 by Louisa Swan and Maria Evans as a means to cultivate artistic culture and practice in the Colony of Tasmania.

== History ==
Two young artists, Louisa Swan, a landscape painter and enamellist, and Maria Evans, founded the Society as the Tasmanian Art Association. Swan served as the society's first Treasurer and Evans its first Secretary, with Sir James Agnew its founding President, serving for seventeen years. The Society gained impressive early membership, which included renowned Australian artists including William Piguenit, Arthur Streeton and Gother Victor Fyers Mann. The society's events attracted interstate talent including Julian Ashton, Tom Roberts, Frederick McCubbin and Blamire Young. Through Swan and Evans' dedication, the society gained notoriety in the Australian arts world through its annual exhibitions of paintings, drawings, sculptures and wood carvings, showcasing Tasmanian artists including Lucien Dechaineux, Curzona Allport, Florence Aline Rodway, Edith Holmes and Dorothy Stoner. Historical council members have included Mildred Lovett and Violet Vimpany.

In its early years, exhibitions were held in locations including the Tasmanian Museum & Art Gallery, the Hobart GPO, town hall and arbitrary locations such as the Lord Mayor's Court Room, department stores, and a Masonic Hall. The society has operated from the Lady Franklin Gallery since 1949.

== Legacy ==
The Art Society of Tasmania was the first of its kind in Australia to be founded by women.
