= Dorothy Stoner =

Australian artist (1904–1992)

- Born: Dorothy Kate Stoner; 28 November 1904; Sussex, England
- Died: 18 November 1992 (aged 88); Hobart, Tasmania, Australia

Dorothy Kate Stoner (28 November 1904 – 18 November 1992) was an Australian artist and teacher. She was known for her pastels and modernistic paintings.

Born in Sussex, England on 27 November 1904, Stoner moved to Tasmania in 1921.

She studied art at Hobart Technical College from 1925 to 1929, her teachers being Lucien Dechaineux and Mildred Lovett. Her teaching career began at Launceston Technical College from 1936 to 1939. She returned to Hobart Technical College in 1940 and taught there during Jack Carington Smith's time as head of school, until 1964.

Two of her watercolours of flowers were included in an exhibition of drawings held Modern Art Centre, Sydney in 1933. The Sydney Morning Herald critic commented that Stoner "neglects the detailed treatment of petal textures which would have lured most artists; and, instead, merely indicates those textures, and concentrates on the effect of heavy outlines, relieved with tonal contrasts of a more general nature. The total impression created is one which mingles tenderness admirably with strength. The colour is highly sensitive and refined."

She exhibited her work regularly in the annual exhibition arranged by The Art Society of Tasmania. In 1946 she illustrated a children's book, Fairy Fancies, by Athalie Jean Bell.

A retrospective exhibition of her work and that of fellow Tasmanian painter Edith Holmes was held in the Arts Council Galleries in Canberra in 1984. Curated by Hendrick Kolenberg of the Tasmanian Museum and Art Gallery, the exhibition brought together 149 artworks. In his review, art critic Sasha Grishin commented: "For me, the great strength in her work is her quality as a draughtsman."

Examples of Stoner's work are on permanent display in the Henry Hunter Galleries at the Tasmanian Museum and Art Gallery.
