= Mildred Lovett =

Australian artist (1880–1955)

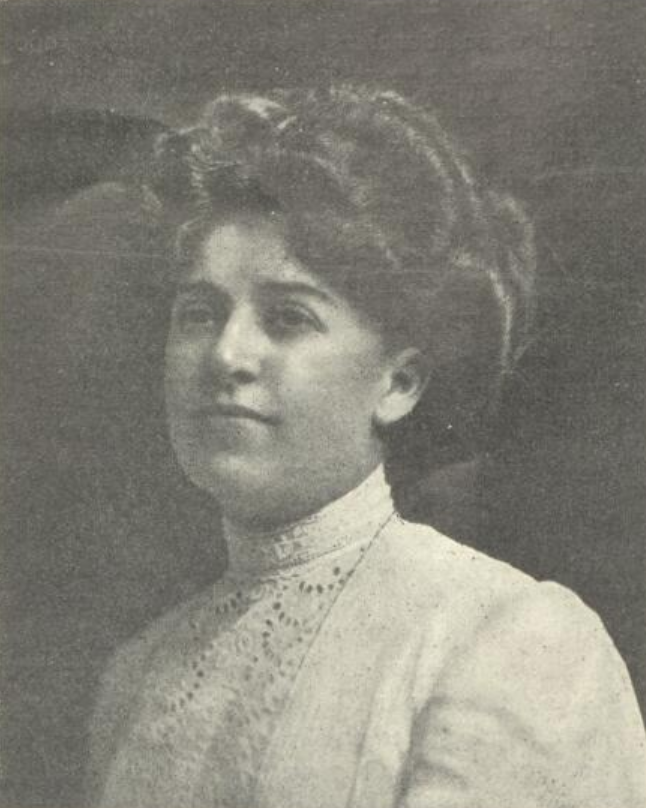
- Mildred Lovett in 1909
- Born: Mildred Esther Lovett; 13 September 1880; Hobart, Tasmania, Australia
- Died: 23 March 1955 (aged 74); Sandy Bay, Hobart, Tasmania
- Known for: Portraiture, china painting, sculpture, art teaching
- Spouse: Stanley Livingstone Paterson

Mildred Esther Lovett (13 September 1880 – 23 March 1955) was a figure in the early 20th century Tasmanian and Australian art scene, known as a teacher and as an artist.

== Artistic career ==
Lovett studied at Mrs H. Barnard's Ladies School, Hobart, Tasmania from 1887 to 1893, where her art teacher was William Henry Charpentier. She left school at 13 and became as a photographic retoucher at McGuffie's Alba Studio in Hobart (one of few stimulating jobs then available for school leavers). After that she five years at Hobart Technical College studying painting, modelling, life drawing and china painting under Ethel Nicholls and Benjamin Sheppard.

In 1901, Lovett moved to Sydney to study under Julian Ashton at Sydney Art School, where she became his assistant teacher. In 1904 she returned to Hobart and began teaching in the Art Department of the Technical College, where she gained a full-time post with a salary of £50 a year, under the leadership of Lucien Dechaineux. By 1925 she had been appointed an art instructor there. Many of her students became noted artists, including Edith Holmes and Dorothy Stoner.

Lovett was a key figure on the Hobart art scene and a council member of The Art Society of Tasmania. Highlights included representing Tasmania in the British Empire Exhibition in London in 1924 and joining the 1926–1927 Group of Modern Painters founded by George Lambert, which exhibited in Sydney.

In 1929 Lovell took leave from the Technical College to make a study tour of Europe, where she enrolled at the Westminster School of Art in London and at the Academie Lhote in Paris.

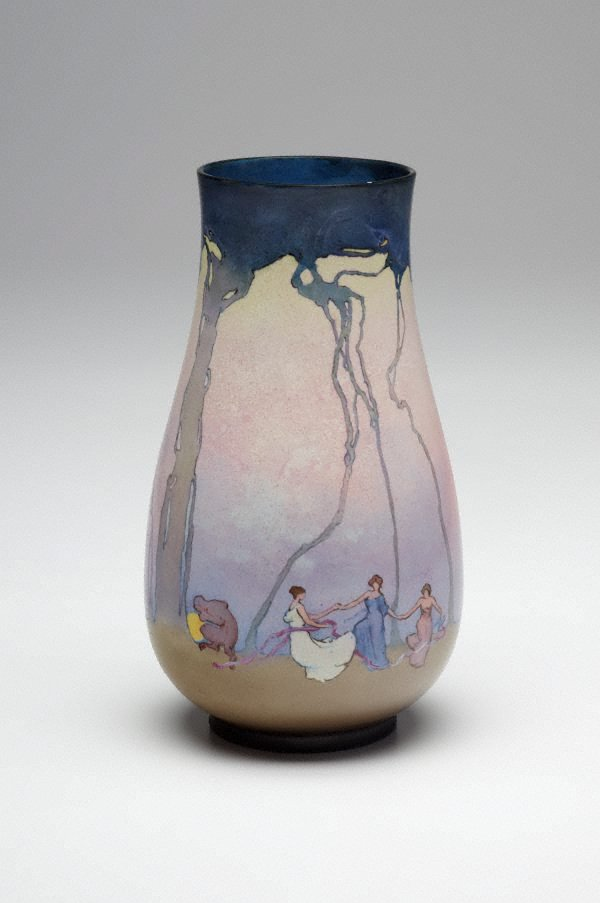
A vase painted by Mildred Lovett, 1909.

Lovell was proficient in oil, water and pastel painting, sculpture and miniatures. What brought her the most critical acclaim was her china painting: The Lone Hand in 1913 put her "amongst the three or four great Australian painters on china". A vase she painted now resides in the Art Gallery of NSW, as one of Australia's key decorative works in the art nouveau style. Work of hers appears also in the National Gallery of Australia and the Tasmanian Museum and Art Gallery.

== Personal life ==
Born in Hobart, Tasmania on 13 September 1880, Lovett lived primarily in Tasmania and Sydney. She was the eldest of four children (two girls and two boys) of Edward Frederick Lovett, and Alice Edith, née Gibson. They were a middle-class family, with her father working as a railway clerk.

At the age of 33 (in 1913), Lovett married Stanley Livingstone Paterson and became the family's major breadwinner for the 40 years of their marriage, supplementing her teaching wage with the sale of her work. Lovett and Stanley had no children. She retired from the Hobart Technical College in 1940 and returned to Sydney with Stanley, where they lived until his death in 1952.

Lovett died in Hobart in 1955 at the age of 75.
