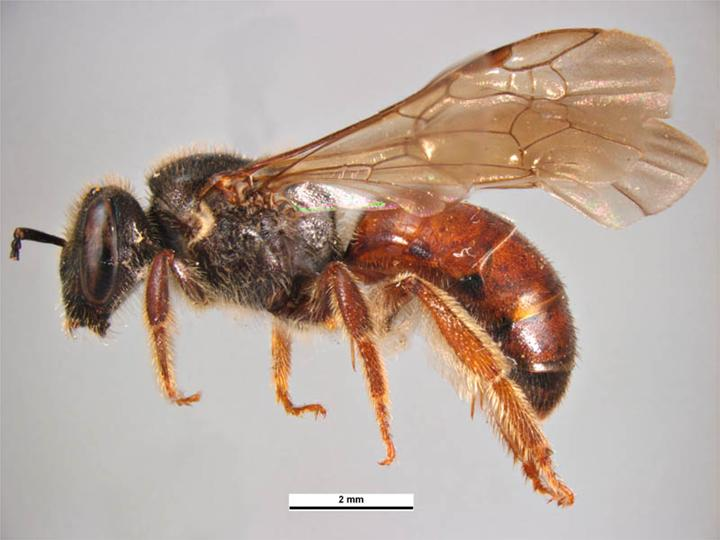
- Female

Scientific classification
- Kingdom: Animalia
- Phylum: Arthropoda
- Clade: Pancrustacea
- Class: Insecta
- Order: Hymenoptera
- Family: Halictidae
- Genus: Lasioglossum
- Species: L. lithuscum

Binomial name
- Lasioglossum lithuscum Smith, 1853

Synonyms
- Parasphecodes lithusca Smith, 1853; Parasphecodes stuchila Smith, 1853; Parasphecodes adelaidae Cockerell, 1905; Parasphecodes wellingtoni Cockerell, 1914; Parasphecodes wellingtoni griseipennis Cockerell, 1929

= Lasioglossum lithuscum =

Species of bee

Lasioglossum lithuscum, or Lasioglossum (Australictus) lithuscum, is a species of bee in the family Halictidae and subfamily Halictinae. It is endemic to Australia. It was described by English entomologist Frederick Smith in 1853.

== Distribution and habitat ==
The species occurs in south-eastern Australia. Type localities include Adelaide in South Australia, Jenolan in New South Wales, and Tasmania, where it has been recorded from Mount Wellington and Lenah Valley.

== Behaviour ==
The adults are flying mellivores. They nest in rotting wood and have sedentary larvae.

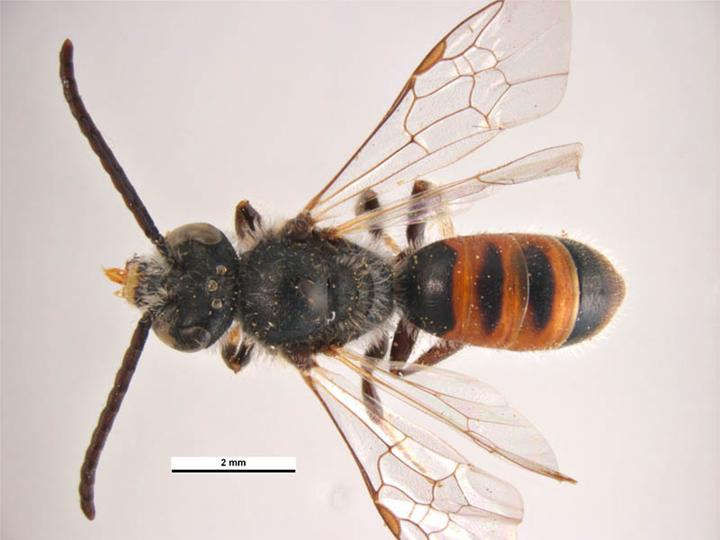
Male
