= No. 29 Squadron RAAF =

Royal Australian Air Force squadron

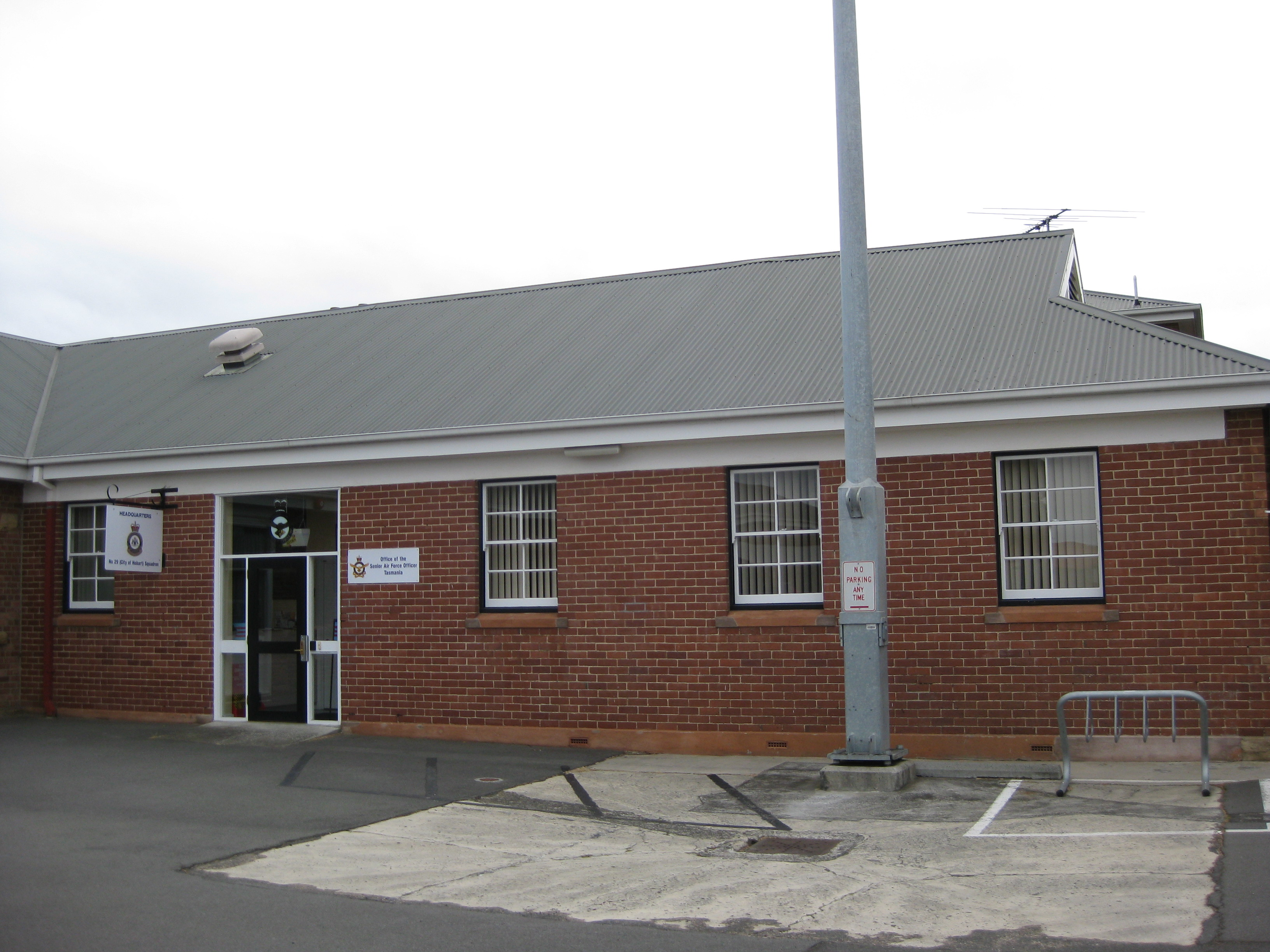
- No. 29 Squadron's headquarters building at Anglesea Barracks, Hobart
- Active: 2001–current
- Branch: Royal Australian Air Force
- Role: Air Force Reserves
- Part of: Reserve Training Wing RAAF
- Garrison/HQ: Anglesea Barracks
- Motto: Faithful in Strength

No. 29 (City of Hobart) Squadron is a Royal Australian Air Force (RAAF) reserve squadron located in Hobart, Tasmania. The squadron was formed in September 2001 and has the role of training Tasmanian RAAF reservists for air base protection tasks.

== History ==
No. 29 Squadron was formed in Hobart on 1 September 2001 as part of the Royal Australian Air Force's Combat Reserve Wing. Prior to this date the only RAAF presence in Tasmania was the Senior Air Force Officer, Tasmania, who was supported by a small staff. It was hoped that establishing the squadron would encourage more Tasmanians to join the RAAF Reserve, and its formation meant that the RAAF had a reserve unit located in each of Australia's state and territory capital cities. As of January 2005, No. 29 Squadron had a strength of 55 reservists and was aiming to reach a strength of 75 personnel. On 1 January 2006 the squadron's parent unit was redesignated Reserve Training Wing RAAF. No. 29 Squadron was granted the Freedom of Entry to Hobart by the Hobart City Council in a ceremony held on 16 September 2006. At that time it was the only RAAF unit located in Tasmania.

The current role of the squadron is to prepare reservists for air base defence tasks, and to provide personnel for the reinforcement of other RAAF units when required. As there are no RAAF bases or aircraft in Tasmania, the roster of No. 29 Squadron does not contain any aircrew or aircraft maintenance personnel. The squadron also provides parties for ceremonial events in Tasmania, including commemorations of the Battle of Britain at Hobart Cenotaph and commemorative services for individual personnel. No. 29 Squadron is currently based at Anglesea Barracks near Hobart's central business district.
