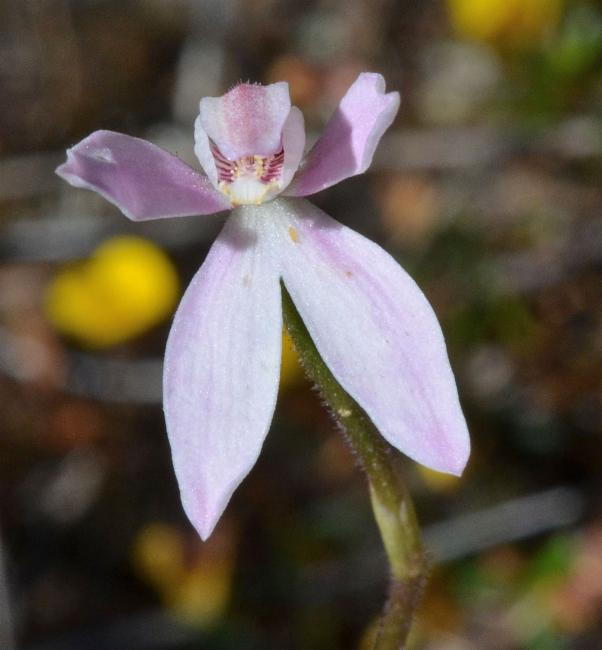

Scientific classification
- Kingdom: Plantae
- Clade: Embryophytes
- Clade: Tracheophytes
- Clade: Spermatophytes
- Clade: Angiosperms
- Clade: Monocots
- Order: Asparagales
- Family: Orchidaceae
- Subfamily: Orchidoideae
- Tribe: Diurideae
- Genus: Caladenia
- Species: C. cracens

Binomial name
- Caladenia cracens D.L.Jones

Synonyms
- Stegostyla cracens (D.L.Jones) D.L.Jones & M.A.Clem.

= Caladenia cracens =

Elegant caladenia

Species of orchid

Caladenia cracens, commonly known as the elegant caladenia, is a plant in the orchid family Orchidaceae and is endemic to Tasmania. It is a ground orchid with a single, sparsely hairy leaf and a single pale to dark pink or mauve flower on a thin, wiry stem 5–18 cm (2–7 in) high.

== Description ==
Caladenia cracens is a terrestrial, perennial, deciduous, herb with an underground tuber and which grows singly or in loose groups. It has a single, sparsely hairy, narrow linear leaf, 5–12 cm (2–5 in) long and 1–3 mm (0.04–0.1 in) wide.

A single, sweetly-scented flower, 20–25 mm (0.8–1 in) across, is borne on a thin, wiry spike 8–15 cm (3–6 in) high. The dorsal sepal is egg-shaped with the narrow end towards the base, 8–12 mm (0.3–0.5 in) long, 3–6 mm (0.1–0.2 in) wide and forms a hood over the labellum and column. The lateral sepals and petals are lance-shaped, 8–13 mm (0.3–0.5 in) long, 3–5 mm (0.1–0.2 in) wide and pale to dark pink. The sepals and petals are glabrous on the front but densely covered with glandular hairs on the back and are held more or less horizontally and spreading from each other. The labellum has three lobes, is broadly egg-shaped when flattened and curves forward, 7–8 mm (0.28–0.31 in) long and 4–6 mm (0.16–0.24 in) wide and has five to eight pairs of linear teeth along the edge, decreasing in size towards the front. There are between two and four irregular rows of thin cream or yellow calli along the centre part. The lateral lobes of the labellum are erect and partly surround the column. The column is about 6 mm (0.2 in) long, 2.5 mm (0.1 in) wide and green to whitish with red markings and has narrow wings. Flowering occurs between late September and early November and is followed by the fruit which is a papery capsule.

== Taxonomy and naming ==
Caladenia cracens was first formally described by David L. Jones in 1996 and the description was published in Muelleria from a specimen collected in the Lenah Valley near Hobart. The specific epithet (cracens) is a Latin word meaning "neat" or "graceful", adjectives "which apply to this graceful species".

== Distribution and habitat ==
Elegant caladenia is widespread in southern Tasmania where it grows in woodland and forest, less commonly in heath.
