= Army Museum of Tasmania =

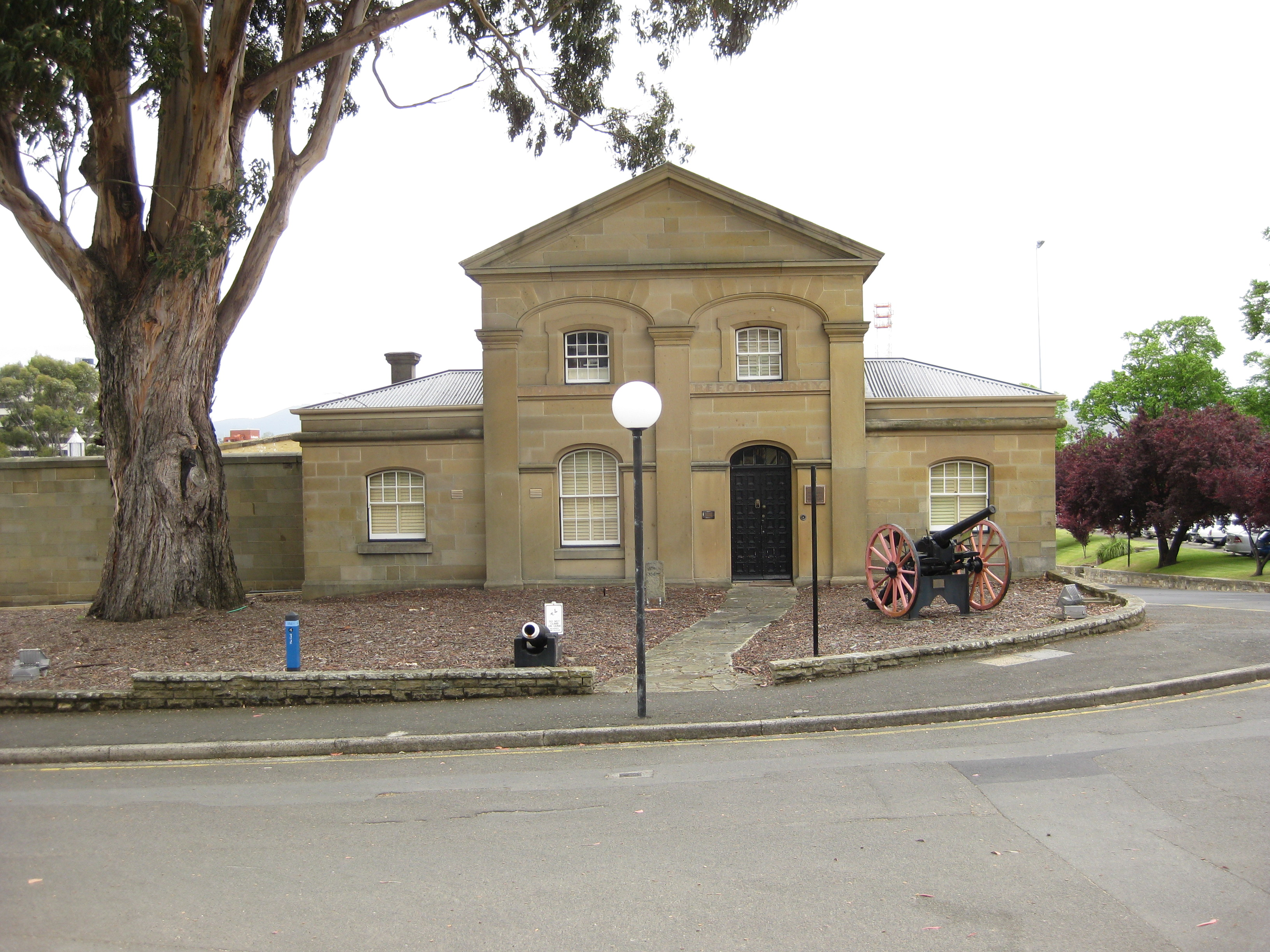
- Established: 1814
- Location: Anglesea Barracks, Hobart, Tasmania
- Coordinates: 42°53′19.48″S 147°19′31.79″E
- Type: Military Museum
- Owner: Government of Australia
- Public transit access: Davey Street-Taxi
- Website: armymuseumtasmania.org.au

The Army Museum of Tasmania (formerly known as the Military Museum of Tasmania) is located within Anglesea Barracks in Hobart, Tasmania, Australia. Anglesea Barracks, constructed in 1814. The Barracks is included on the Commonwealth Heritage List.

The museum is located in the military jail which was built in 1847. The building has undergone few changes from when it was built despite its multiple uses, including as a girls reformatory, a married quarter, a store and offices.

Displays include items from the colonial period when the British Army occupied the barracks to the current operational deployments with a focus on Tasmanian servicemen and women within the Australian Defence Force.

== See also ==
- Royal Tasmania Regiment
- Tasmanian Museum & Art Gallery
- List of museums in Tasmania
