= Edith Lilla Holmes =

Australian artist (1893–1973)

- Self-portrait
- Born: 9 March 1893; Hamilton, Tasmania, Australia
- Died: 26 August 1973 (aged 80); Hobart, Tasmania, Australia
- Known for: Painting

Edith Lilla Holmes (9 March 1893 – 26 August 1973) was an Australian artist active in Tasmania.

== Early life ==
Holmes was born on 9 March 1893 in Hamilton, Tasmania, Australia, the third of five children. Her father, William Nassau Holmes, was an Irish schoolmaster and her mother, Lilla Edith (néeThorne), was a Tasmanian-born teacher. Holmes spent her childhood in Hamilton, Devonport and Scottsdale, until her family settled down in Moonah. Her mother recognised Holmes' "good sense of colour" from a young age and encouraged her to pursue art.

Holmes attended the Hobart Technical College from 1918 to 1935, where she studied art under the tutelage of Lucien Dechaineux and Mildred Lovett. From 1930 to 1931, she also took classes at the Sydney Art School under Julian Ashton and Henry Gibbons. It was there that she became acquainted with Thea Proctor and George Lambert.

== Career ==
In the 1930s, Holmes operated a studio in Hobart together with Lovett, Florence Rodway, Dorothy Stoner, Ethel Nicholls, and Violet Vimpany. Her work was well-received by critics and from 1938 to 1951, she had seven exhibitions in Melbourne, where she met artists Danila Vassilieff, Eveline Syme, George Bell, and Arnold Shaw.

Holmes' annual exhibitions from 1927 to 1972 were supported by the Tasmanian Art Society, whose council Holmes was a member of from 1930 to 1952. She was among the founding members of the Tasmanian Group of Painters in 1940. In 1954, Holmes won a special prize at an art competition commemorating the sesquicentenary of Hobart. In 1958, she held an exhibition at Tasmania House in London. Two of Holmes' self-portraits, painted in the 1930s, are housed at the Tasmanian Museum and Art Gallery. Holmes was also an active participant of the Victoria League, the English Speaking Union, and the Women's Non-Party League of Tasmania. She was a life member of the United Nations Association's Tasmanian division.

== Death and recognition ==
Holmes died on 26 August 1973 in Hobart, aged 80. She was buried in Forcett Cemetery. In 2003, the Moonah Arts Centre held an exhibition in tribute to Holmes' life. In 2005, she was inducted into the Tasmanian Government's Honour Roll of Women for her contributions to art in Tasmania.
