= Eliza Ashton =

Australian journalist, literary critic and social reformer (c. 1851–1900)

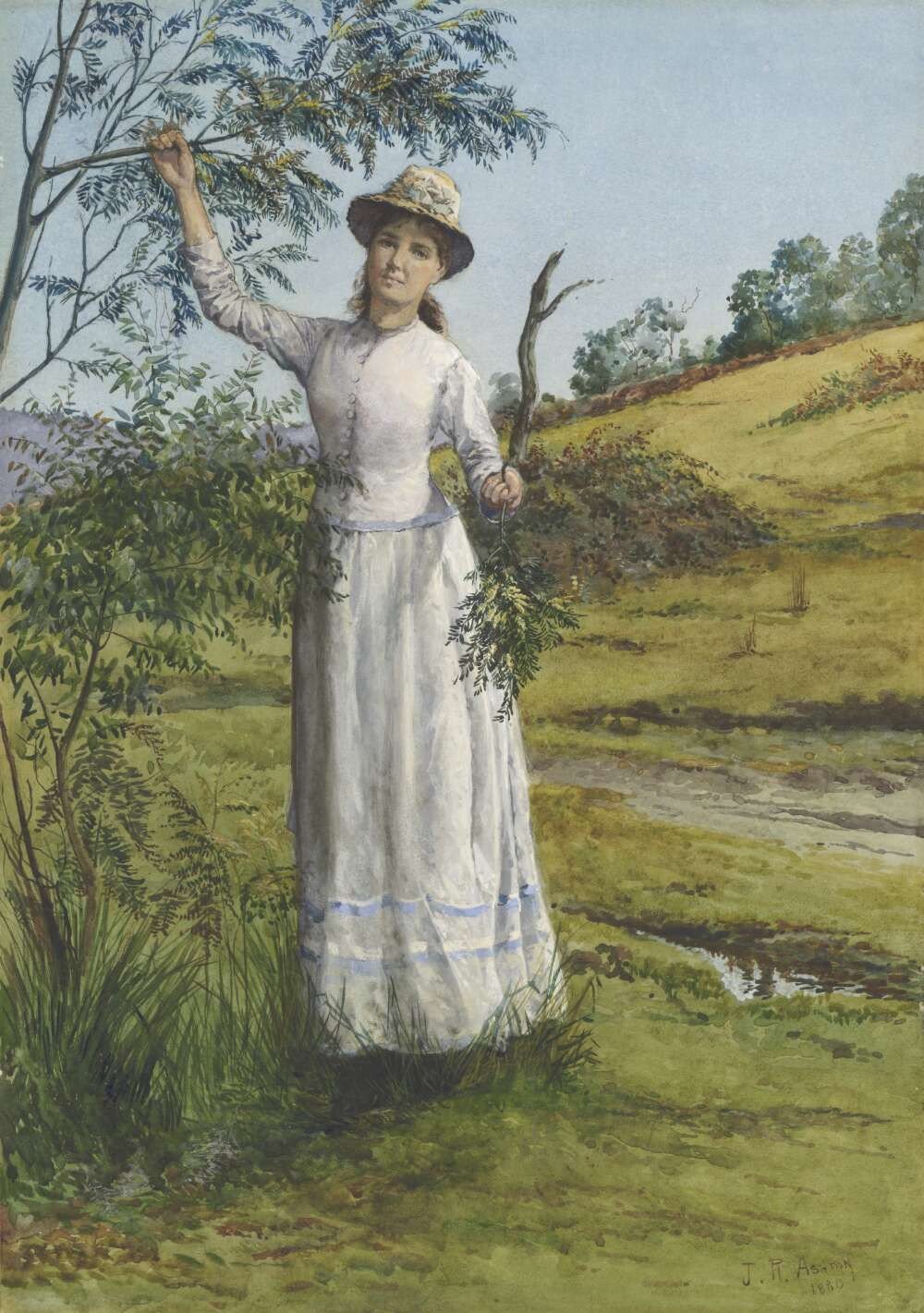
- A 1880 painting of Ashton
- Born: Eliza Ann Pugh; 1851 or 1852; Stoke Newington, London, England
- Died: 15 July 1900 (aged 48); Waverley, New South Wales
- Burial place: Waverley; 33°54′26″S 151°15′51″E
- Other names: Faustine, Mrs Julian Ashton
- Occupation: Journalist
- Years active: 1889 – 1900
- Spouse: Julian Ashton
- Children: 5

Eliza Ann Ashton (née Pugh; 1851 or 1852 – 15 July 1900) was an English-born Australian journalist and social reformer. She wrote for The Sydney Morning Herald and The Daily Telegraph under the names Faustine and Mrs Julian Ashton. She was a founding member of the Womanhood Suffrage League of New South Wales.

== Early life ==
Eliza Ann Pugh was born in Stoke Newington, England in either 1851 or 1852. Her father was a manager at J.S. Morgan & Co. She attended a college for girls in North London, followed by a boarding school in France. She married the artist Julian Ashton on 1 August 1876 and moved with him to Australia in 1878.

== Career ==
Ashton was a journalist, writer and literary critic for The Sydney Morning Herald and The Daily Telegraph of Sydney. She also wrote an article on the education of girls in the Centennial Magazine.

Under the pseudonym Faustine she wrote mainly social commentary pieces while under the name Mrs Julian Ashton she was known as a literary critic with a keen analysis. She was described by a writer in Table Talk as a practical philosopher with no sympathy for the purely sentimental.

Ashton was an active social reformer, being a committee member of the Women's Literary Society in Sydney and a founding member of the Womanhood Suffrage League of New South Wales.

At a league meeting on 11 November 1891, she presented a paper calling for radical changes to the laws of marriage. One of the reported proposals was to require both parties to renew their marriage vows each year; if either party refused they would have an automatic divorce. News of the proposal prompted a wave of criticism in the press and accusations that Ashton was trying to promote concepts of "free love," "concubinage" and prostitution. One of her critics was Lady Jersey, the wife of the Governor of New South Wales. Lady Jersey banned Ashton from visiting Government House, the Governor's official residence (a significant handicap for her role as a journalist) and called on the league to distance themselves from Ashton. The league, represented by their secretary Rose Scott, quickly disassociated themselves from Ashton's views on marriage, however, Ashton remained as a member of the league.

Ashton's views were defended by her husband in a letter of 16 November, in which he expressed regret and astonishment of society's inability to debate the subject. On 25 November her own letter was published in The Daily Telegraph and The Sydney Morning Herald, in which she described the public response as a "storm of abuse and misrepresentation." At the same time she published the full text of her paper and challenged readers to identify the position she was claimed as advocating.

On 10 April 1892, Ashton gave another lecture on marriage, which was summarised by the Daily Telegraph and repeated later in the month by The Kerang Times. This prompted renewed criticism from other press sources, such as The Evening News. On 26 April, writing under the name L. A. Ashton, she gave an account of a subsequent debate on the subject with Scott and Frank Cotton, a Labour politician. While they opposed her views, she welcomed their polite opposition rather than the rudeness and anonymity she faced from others.

In 1899 Lady Jersey wrote to the wife of the new Governor, Lady Beauchamp, advising her to allow Ashton to again visit Government House. Lady Jersey explained that she had felt forced to counter such publicly expressed views but had never heard anything negative about Ashton's personal character.

Despite the criticism at the start of the decade, Ashton remained an active journalist until a week before her death in 1900.

== Family ==
She had five children with her husband.

- Julian Howard Ashton (9 August 1877 – 30 April 1964) also an artist and journalist.
- Percival George Ashton (27 November 1878 – 19 November 1953) known in later life as Captain Percy Ashton.
- Bertha Rossi Ashton (1882 – 6 February 1970) married William Charlton Hubble in July 1923. (Note: Some sources mistakenly identify Bertha as the mother of William's children from his first marriage.)
- Rupert Rossi Ashton (1885 – 4 March 1895)
- Arthur Roy Ashton (1886 – 2 October 1917) killed in action in Belgium.

== Death ==
On 11 July 1900, Ashton became ill with what was described as nervous prostration, before falling into unconsciousness the following day. Her condition deteriorated and she died on 15 July of a brain haemorrhage. She was buried at Waverley Cemetery.
