= James Sherwin (potter) =

Australian potter

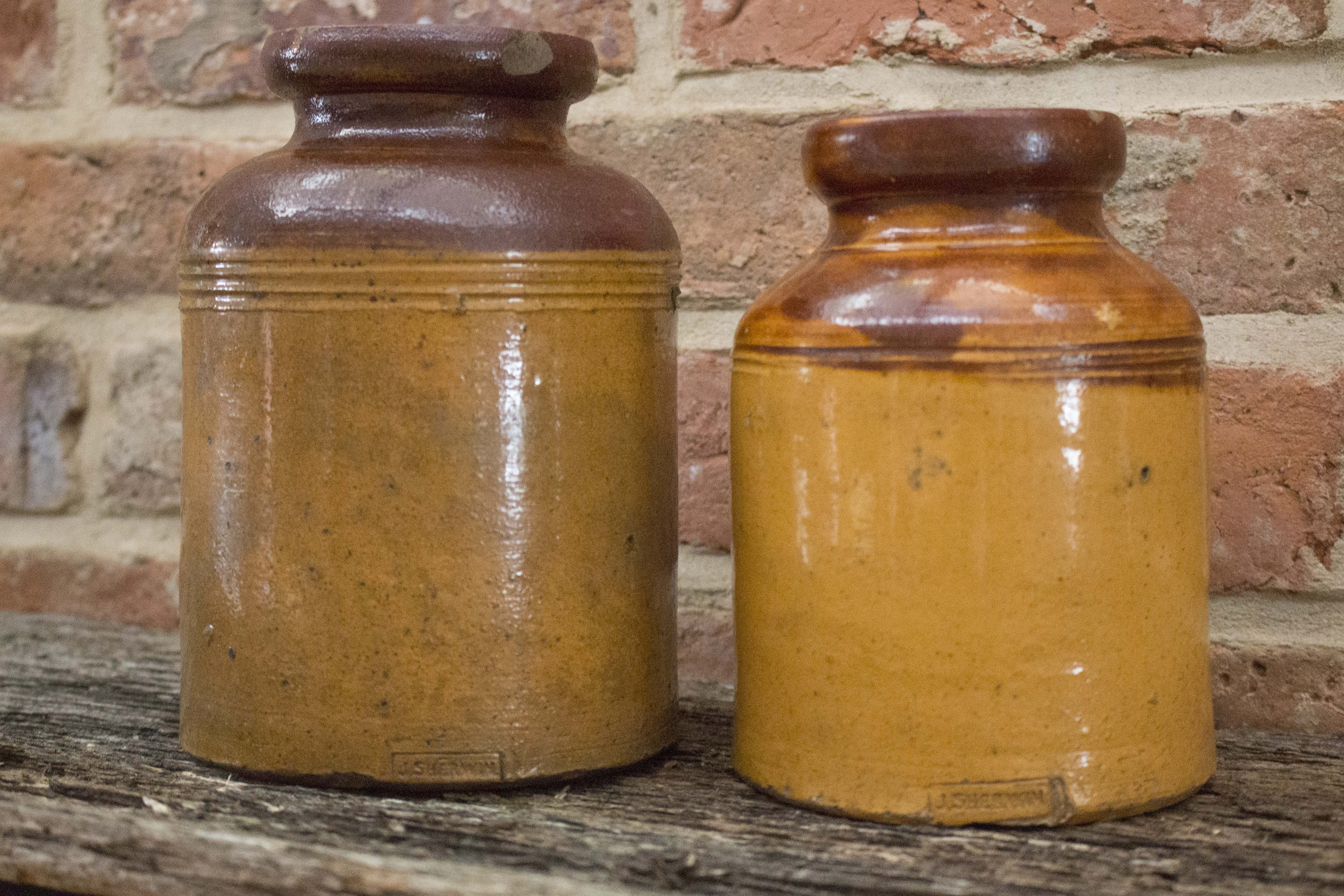
- James Sherwin jars
- Born: January 1, 1790; England
- Died: July 17, 1854 (aged 64); Hobart, Tasmania
- Known for: potter

James Sherwin (c. 1790-17 – July 1854) was an Australian potter. James Sherwin established one of Australia's earliest commercial potteries in 1831 along Pottery Road, Lenah Valley, Tasmania.

James Sherwin trained as a potter in Staffordshire, England. Sherwin moved to St Petersburg, Russia in the early 1820s. However, tragedy struck in 1824 when his wife and son died in floods which also destroyed his burgeoning pottery business. Looking for a new beginning, and with his brother already in Van Diemen's Land, Sherwin set his sights on the island. Arriving in Van Diemen's Land in 1831, Sherwin established his pottery in the Hobart suburb of Lenah Valley.

The clay at the site chosen did initially prove unsatisfactory and ‘poor in nature’, resulting in Sherwin writing to the Lieutenant Governor Arthur in 1831 asking to enhance the clay at his site by combining it with clay with that in the Government Domain:

‘...due to the very poor nature of the clay which my place affords, but there is a bed of white clay situated in the beach between Hobart Town and New Town (in Government Domain close to the nature edge) a portion of which mixed with mine would tend greatly to improve its quality and remove in a great degree the heavy losses.’

Sherwin Pottery jars are distinctive with their two toned glaze and no handles. The jars have a mustard coloured base and brown glazed upper portion encompassing the jars mouth. There are three etched lines at the coupling of the mustard and brown glazes. These rare examples seem to be all that survive of Sherwin Pottery, however it produced a huge array of serviceable pottery, as advertised in the Hobart Town Courier in 1835: bread pans, milk pots, cream pots, butter containers, cheese pans, baking dishes, hand basins, pipkins, flower pots, chimney pots, malt kiln tiles etc. Sherwin also played a role in producing earthenware for Hobart's infrastructure by making earthen made pipes for the supply of water.

Sherwin Pottery was recognised as being comparable in ‘neatness and durability' to anything of the kind imported from England and considerably cheaper. The pottery was also credited with successfully competing against the substandard pottery coming from Sydney. With the Hobart Town Courier stating in 1831 that even ‘though apparently neat and well-made, [Sydney pottery] were nevertheless in some degree pervious, and allowed the liquid in them to escape’.

By 1836, the Pottery in Kangaroo Valley was advertised for sale as Sherwin wanted to move to another area of ‘more convenience’. However Sherwin pottery continued to be sold and exhibited up until James Sherwin's death on 17 July 1854 aged 64.

The pottery site was later used by other potters; William Ellis in the 1860s then in the 1880s by Alexander Worbey.
