= Justine Kong Sing =

Justine Kong Sing (1868–1960) was a Chinese-Australian miniature portrait painter.

== Early life and career ==
Born 1868 in Nundle, New South Wales. Kong Sing trained with Julian Ashton in Sydney and completed her studies at the National Gallery School, Melbourne. During this time she shared an artist studio with fellow Australian artist Florence Rodway.

Kong Sing exhibited with the Royal Art Society of New South Wales in 1905, 1909, 1910 and 1911. In 1909, her etching A boat docked on the Yarra, was included in the Royal Society album presented to then Governor of New South Wales, Lord Chelmsford. Notable figures Kong Sing has painted portraits of includes Madame Sze (Tang Yu-hua), wife of the Chinese Minister Alfred Sao-ke Sze; and a commemorative 1943 miniature of Dame Enid Lyons AD GBE.

Working as a governess on the North Coast in New South Wales, Kong Sing later moved to London, where she worked exclusively as a painter of portrait miniatures, showing work at the Royal Academy in 1915 and 1916, the Paris Salon of 1912 and the Walker & Grosvenor Galleries. Later Kong Sing lived in Majorca, Spain, for twenty years until the outbreak of the Spanish Civil War, then returned to London, subsequently returning to Australia, where she continued to paint miniatures. Kong Sing died in 1960 at Kirribilli, Sydney.

Kong Sing's work featured among that of 50 women in a 2025 exhibition co-presented by Agsa and the Art Gallery of New South Wales (AGNSW) and entitled 'Dangerously Modern Australian Women Artists in Europe 1890-1940'.

== Collections ==
- National Gallery of Victoria, Melbourne, VIC.
- Art Gallery of New South Wales, Sydney, NSW, Australia
- National Portrait Gallery, Canberra.
- National Library of Australia, Canberra.

== See also ==
- Florence Rodway
- Julian Ashton Art School
