= Florence Aline Rodway =

Australian artist (1881–1971)

Florence Rodway
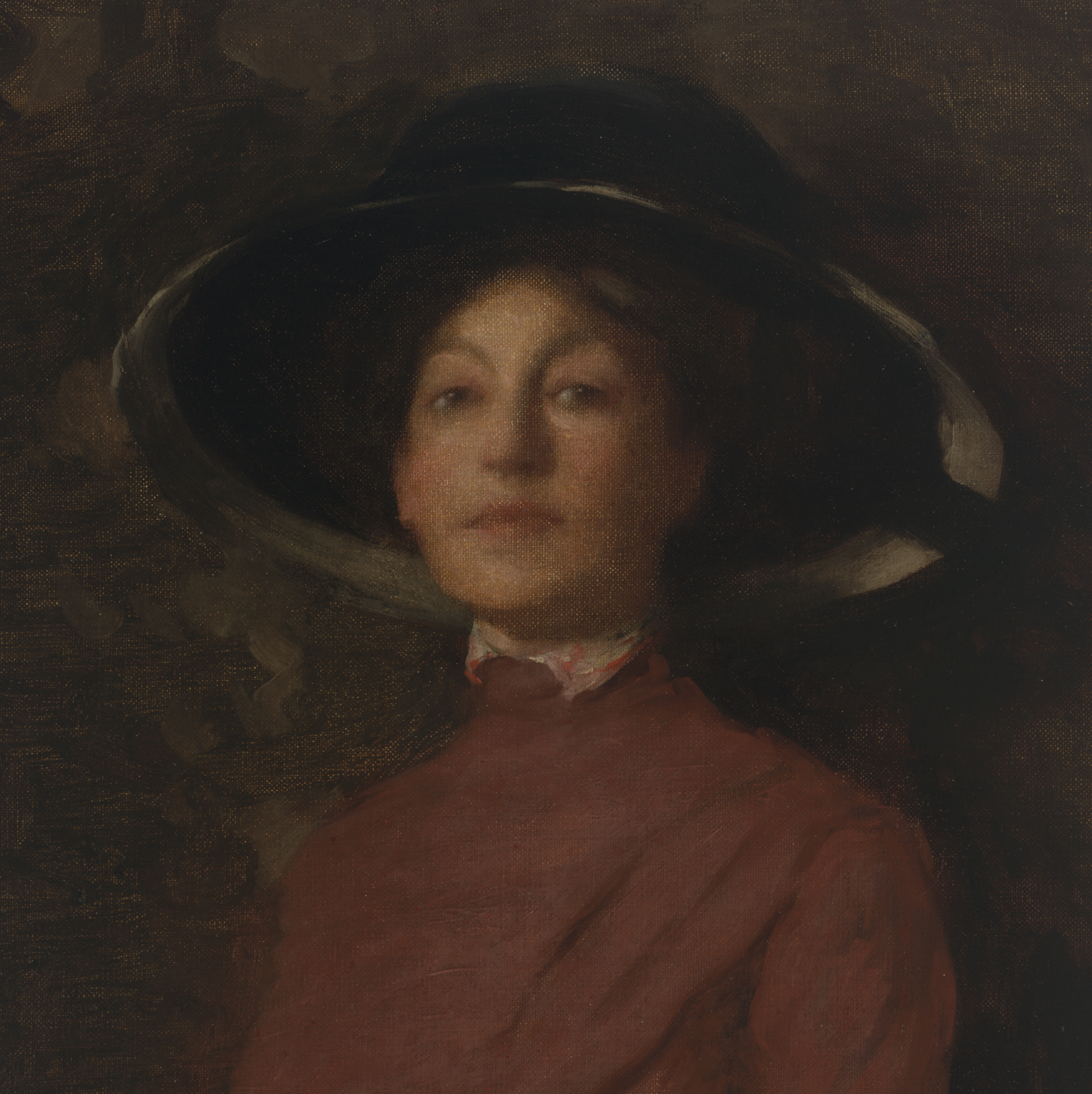
- Born: Florence Aline Rodway; 11 November 1881; Hobart, Tasmania, Australia
- Died: 23 January 1971 (aged 89); Hobart, Tasmania, Australia
- Education: Hobart Technical College (now TasTAFE); Royal Academy of Arts, London; Julian Ashton Art School, Sydney
- Known for: pastel drawing, portraits, painting
- Notable work: Portrait of a Woman (1907-10); The Interview (c. 1920); Henry Lawson (1914)

Florence Aline Rodway (11 November 1881 – 23 January 1971) was an Australian artist best known for her portraits. Born in the Tasmanian city of Hobart, she was the second of six children to Leonard Rodway and Louisa Susan, née Phillips. She studied painting at the Hobart Technical College (now TasTAFE); after two years her work was sent to London, and she was awarded a three-year scholarship to study painting at the Royal Academy of Arts, London. She is best known for having painted portraits of notable figures in Australian history, including Dame Nellie Melba, William Bridges, J. F. Archibald and Henry Lawson.

== Early life ==
Florence Aline Rodway was born in the family home on Macquarie Street, Hobart, Tasmania on 11 November 1881. She was the second child of six, having five brothers. Her father was dentist and botanist Leonard Rodway, an Englishman who migrated to Queensland, where he met and married Louisa Phillips, a dentist's daughter. They moved to Hobart and had five sons and a daughter.

Rodway later recalled that she drew often and well as a child, so she studied art at the Hobart Technical School, under Benjamin Shepherd. After two years of study, samples of her work were sent to London, and she was awarded a four-year scholarship to study in London at the Royal Academy of Arts. This was an uncommon achievement for a Tasmanian artist, especially a woman, at that time. Rodway was unable to complete the course, however, as she could not afford to live in London. Instead, she returned to Australia and moved to Sydney, where she established her reputation as an artist.

== Early career (1906–1913) ==
Portrait of Bertha Lawson, ca.1913, by Florence Rodway

Rodway established a studio in Sydney and continued to study, under Sydney Long at the Julian Ashton Art School. At one point she shared her studio with fellow student of Julian Ashton, the Chinese-Australian artist Justine Kong Sing. She produced studies and illustrations for publications, including The Lone Hand. She joined the Society of Artists and exhibited in the Society members' shows. She developed her mastery of pastels, for which she was widely recognised. She was one of only a few female artists to be lauded as the equal of male artists. One 1909 critic went so far as to say that gender was irrelevant in her case: 'Sex is an accident — the capacity for expressing the infinitely large or the infinitesimally little cannot be gauged by outward measurements. The soul frequently bears little relation to its case. Else, why does Florence Rodway, tall, slight and blonde, revel in peopling large spaces with the Titanic creatures of her imagination.'

The Art Gallery of New South Wales purchased work in 1910 and from then her reputation as a portraitist only grew. She completed many portraits in pastel, especially of children, whom she was considered particularly skilled at depicting. She was commissioned to create portraits of notable figures including Dame Nellie Melba and Henry Lawson.

== Mid-career (1914–1930) ==
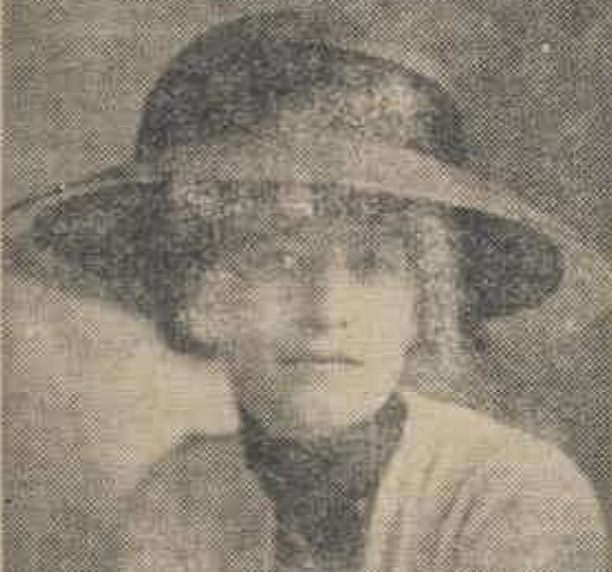
Florence Rodway

In 1914 she had her first solo exhibition, of 40 portraits and pastel drawings at the Athenaeum Gallery in Melbourne. This included works lent by the owners (who were often the subjects of the works,) including Dame Nellie Melba, Julian Ashton and J. F. Archibald. She sat for a portrait painted by Norman Carter (in the collection of the State Library of New South Wales.) In a newspaper review of the Society of Artists' 1916 exhibition, she was commended as "...the principal "dealer in magic and spells" due to pastel effort is Miss Florence Rodway, whose portraits are again one of the leading features of the show. The most striking example of her talent is the strong, young, handsome face of a woman full of vitality and expression, in which the flesh-tones show up admirably against the yellow, gold-tinted background. Miss Rodway's portraits of children are charming, and we like also the homely interior entitled "The New Teapot," in which the artist's fine appreciation of the pastel medium is markedly apparent."

She was commissioned to paint portraits for major public collections. The Art Gallery of New South Wales commissioned portraits of J. F. Archibald (1921) and William Bridges (1919). The Australian War Memorial commissioned portraits of William Bridges (1920), Henry Normand MacLaurin (1922) and Captain Walter Gilchrist (1925).

She married civil engineer Walter Moore in 1920, and had a daughter, Suzanne, in 1922. Marriage and motherhood seem to slow down her career, but she continued to paint and exhibit. She was chosen to represent Australia in 1928, with other artists including Thea Proctor, Margaret Preston, John Longstaff, Arthur Streeton and Hans Heysen, at the London exhibition of contemporary art of the Empire at the Imperial Institute, South Kensington.

== Later career (1931–1971) ==
Rodway and her family moved to Hobart in 1932. She exhibited paintings in the 1934 Women Artists of Australia exhibition in Sydney and held two exhibitions with fellow Tasmanian artist Edith Holmes at the Westminster Gallery, Melbourne, in 1948 and at the Adult Education Board, Hobart, in 1953. She showed work in the 1950–51 exhibitions of the Melbourne Society of Women Painters and Sculptors and continued to exhibit with The Art Society of Tasmania and the Tasmanian Group of Painters. She died in Hobart on 23 January 1971.

== Exhibitions ==
Dangerously Modern exhibition at the Art Gallery of South Australia 24 May 2025 - 7 Sep 2025
