= Rhoda Wager =

British jewellery designer (1875–1953)

Rhoda Wager (10 March 1875 – 2 December 1953) was a British jewellery designer who later settled in Australia.

She was born on 10 March 1875 in Mile End, London, one of five children of warehouseman George Wager and his wife Jane Annabella, née James.

Wager grew up in Bristol, and studied there at a local art school, then trained in drawing and painting at the Glasgow School of Art from 1897 to 1903. She also made jewellery with Bernard Cuzner.

In 1913, Wager moved to Fiji, where she lived on her brother's sugar plantation. In 1918, she moved to Sydney, Australia.

In March 1920, she married Percy G. Ashton, son of Julian Ashton CBE (1851–1942), an English-born Australian artist.

Wager died in Brisbane on 2 December 1953.
