= Air Force Reserve (Australia) =

- Active: 1936 (as Citizen Air Force)
- Country: Australia
- Type: Air Force
- Part of: Royal Australian Air Force
- March: Royal Australian Air Force

Commanders
- Chief of the Defence Force: Air Chief Marshal Mark Binskin AC
- Chief of Air Force: Air Marshal Gavin "Leo" Davies
- Director General Reserves – Air Force: Air Commodore Bob Rodgers AM CSM FAHRI

The Air Force Reserve or RAAF Reserve is the common, collective name given to the reserve units of the Royal Australian Air Force (RAAF). The reserve component has also been known as the Citizen Air Force (CAF).

In 1919, in his Outline Policy for the Military Air Force of Australia, Major General J. G. Legge proposed: "The Military Air Force of Australia should mainly be composed from Citizen Forces with a proportion of permanent troops. The latter to provide for the instruction of the force and the maintenance of equipment."

While the RAAF was established in 1921, it was not until April 1936 that CAF units were raised in Adelaide, Brisbane, Melbourne, Perth and Sydney.

In 1981, the active reserve – as opposed to the inactive or standby component – of the Citizen Air Force was renamed the RAAF Active Reserve. At around the same time, it began accepting female members.

Combat Reserve Wing, later renamed Reserve Training Wing, became responsible for recruiting and training members of the Air Force Reserve on 18 May 1998.
