= Lady Franklin Gallery =

Art museum in Hobart, Australia

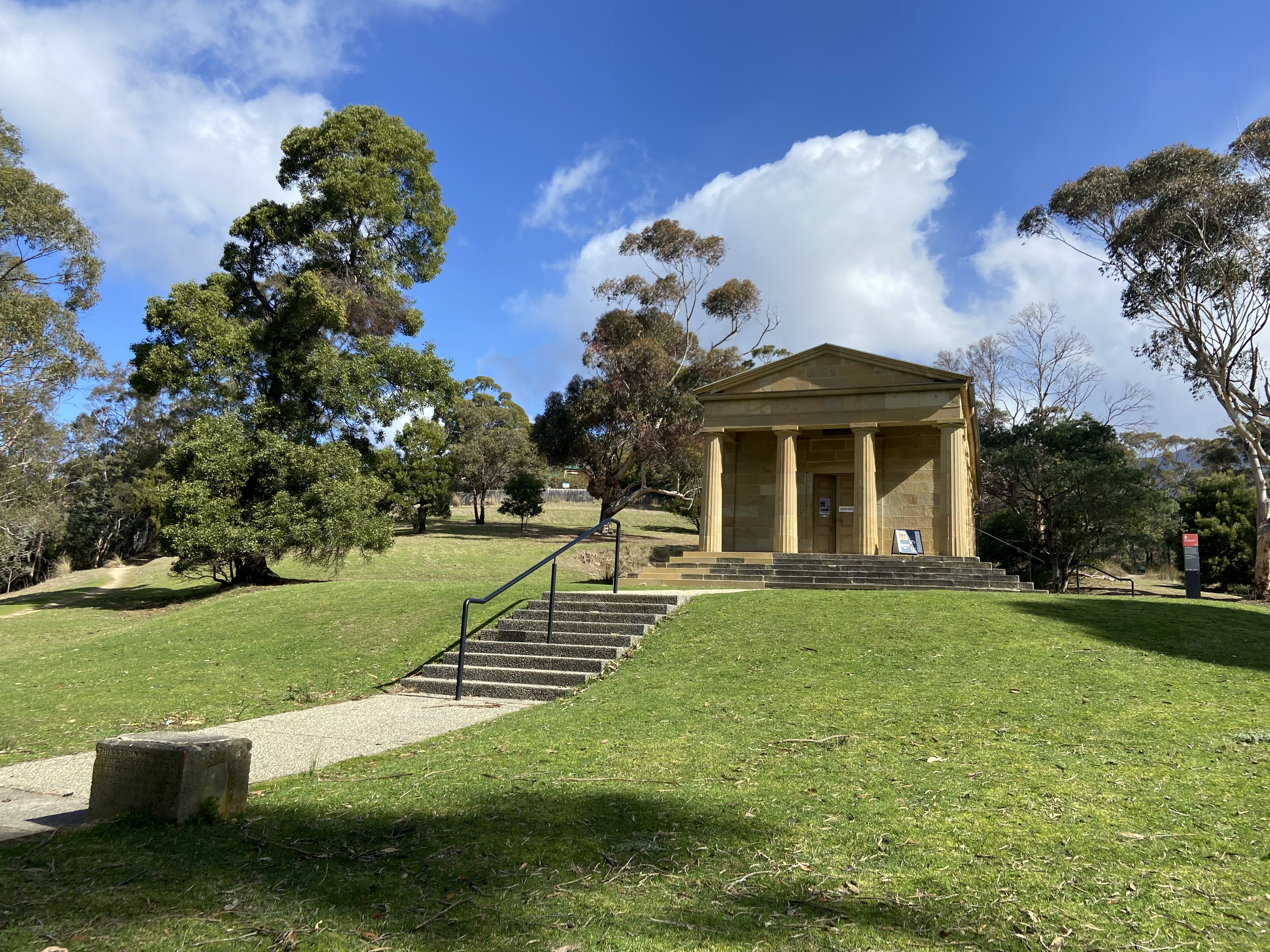
- Gallery and Ancanthe parkland in 2023

- Location within Tasmania
- Former name: Lady Franklin Museum
- Established: 1843
- Location: Lenah Valley, Tasmania, Australia
- Coordinates: 42°51′58″S 147°16′41″E
- Type: contemporary art
- Architect: James Blackburn
- Owner: Hobart City Council
- Public transit access: Road-Metro/Taxi
- Parking: On site
- Website: artstas.com.au

Tasmanian Heritage Register
- Place ID: 2,610
- Status: Permanently Registered

The Lady Franklin Gallery and Ancanthe Park is a historic sandstone museum and 2.96-hectare (7.3-acre) parkland in Lenah Valley, Tasmania, Australia. When it opened on 26 October 1843, it became the first privately funded museum in Australia.

== History ==
“A pretty little design for a Glyptothek... I mean nothing more than 1, 2 or 3 rooms, of small size tho’ good proportions, to hold a small number of pictures, and a dozen of casts of the Elgin and Vatican marbles”.

— Lady Franklin's museum vision in 1841

In 1836, Lady Jane Franklin and her husband Sir John Franklin relocated to Van Diemen's Land when he was appointed lieutenant-governor of the colony. In 1839, she purchased 53 hectares (130 acres) of land in Lenah Valley with the intent of building a museum and botanical garden, which she named Ancanthe, Ancient Greek for "blooming valley". Built at her own expense in the Greek revivalist style with convict labour, the sandstone museum opened to the public on 26 October 1843. The museum displayed Tasmanian memorabilia, books, botanical specimens, sculptures, and other items from Lady Franklin's personal collection. Her hopes for the parklands to be transformed into a botanic garden never materialised. When the Franklins departed Tasmania in 1843, the museum and estate were entrusted to the nearby Queen's College, which itself was purchased by the Hutchins School in 1893. During this period, Lady Franklin's artefacts were dispersed, large portions of the parklands were sold for housing and the museum became a storehouse for apples.

The museum and parklands remained privately owned and in a state of disrepair until they were purchased by the Hobart City Council in 1921. The Art Society of Tasmania located to the premises in 1949. The Lady Franklin Gallery is designated on the Tasmanian Heritage Register.

=== Ancanthe Park development ===
In 2013, the Saving Ancanthe Action Group unsuccessfully petitioned for the Hobart City Council to facilitate the purchase of former parkland surrounding the gallery on the merits of its historical and environmental value as a means to save it from housing development. The group further hoped to establish a Cultural Landscape and Historic Centre in the Vicinity of Ancanthe Park. In 2014, author Alison Alexander, who won the National Biography Award for her book The Ambitions of Jane Franklin, Victorian Lady Adventurer opposed the subdivision of sixteen allotments of Ancanthe Park. Since at least 2015, the Ancanthe parkland has been further subdivided, with allotments sold for housing development. This resulted in the extension of Ancanthe Avenue, which runs directly through the former estate.

== See also ==
- List of museums in Tasmania
