= Reserve Training Wing RAAF =

Reserve Training Wing
- Active: 1998–current
- Branch: Royal Australian Air Force
- Role: Air Force Reserve training
- Part of: Air Force Training Group
- Garrison/HQ: RAAF Base Amberley

Reserve Training Wing is the Royal Australian Air Force (RAAF) unit responsible for recruiting and training members of the Air Force Reserve. It was formed on 18 May 1998 and redesignated to its current name on 1 January 2006.
