= Anglesea Barracks =

Australian Defence Organisation barracks in central Hobart, Tasmania, Australia

- Hobart, Tasmania
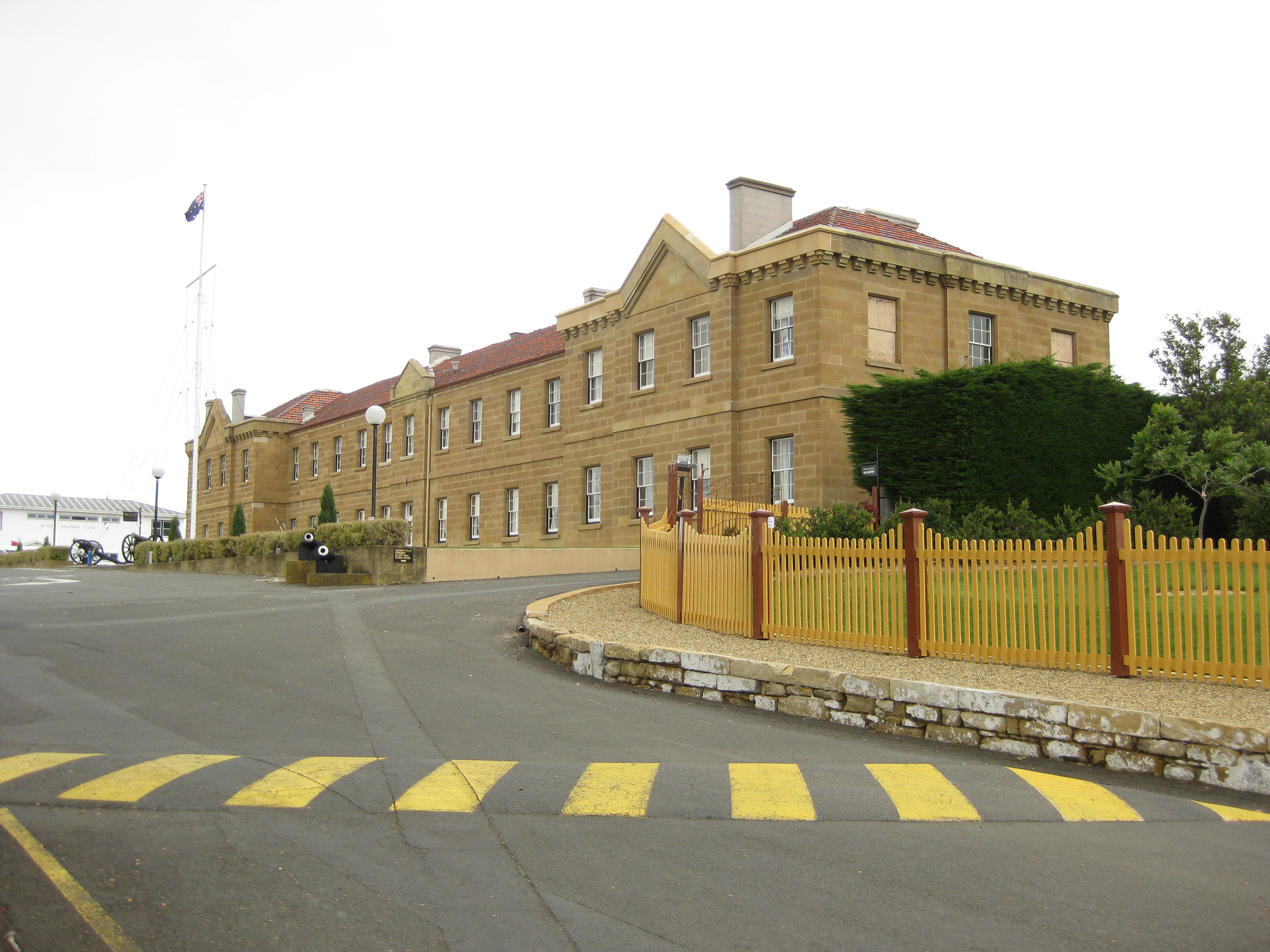
- The two-storey Soldiers Barracks at Anglesea Barracks. This building was built between 1847 and 1848.

Site information
- Type: Defence Establishment
- Controlled by: Australian Defence Organisation, Australian Government

Location
- Coordinates: 42°53′19″S 147°19′32″E

Site history
- Built: 1814
- In use: 1814–present

Anglesea Barracks is an Australian Defence Force barracks in central Hobart, Tasmania. The site was chosen in December 1811 by Lachlan Macquarie and construction began on the first buildings to occupy the site in 1814. It is the oldest Australian Army barracks still in use and celebrated its bicentenary in December 2011.

Despite the small variation in spelling it was named after Henry Paget, 1st Marquess of Anglesey who was involved with the Board of Ordnance.

== Current units and facilities ==
Anglesea Barracks is the administrative centre for all Defence sites in Tasmania.

The barracks is home to various civilian and military departments including:

- Battalion HQ, 12th/40th Battalion, Royal Tasmania Regiment
- Adelaide Universities Regiment, Tasmania Company
- Australian Army Band – Tasmania
- No. 29 Squadron RAAF (Royal Australian Air Force)
- Navy Headquarters Tasmania (Royal Australian Navy)
- TS Hobart, Australian Navy Cadet Band
- Anglesea Barracks Medical Centre
- Defence Estate and Infrastructure Group – Service Delivery Division Victoria & Tasmania
- Defence Force Recruiting
- Australian Air Force Cadets – 502 Squadron & 5 Wing Headquarters
- Australian Army Cadets – Tasmania Battalion Headquarters

=== Angelsea Barracks messing ===
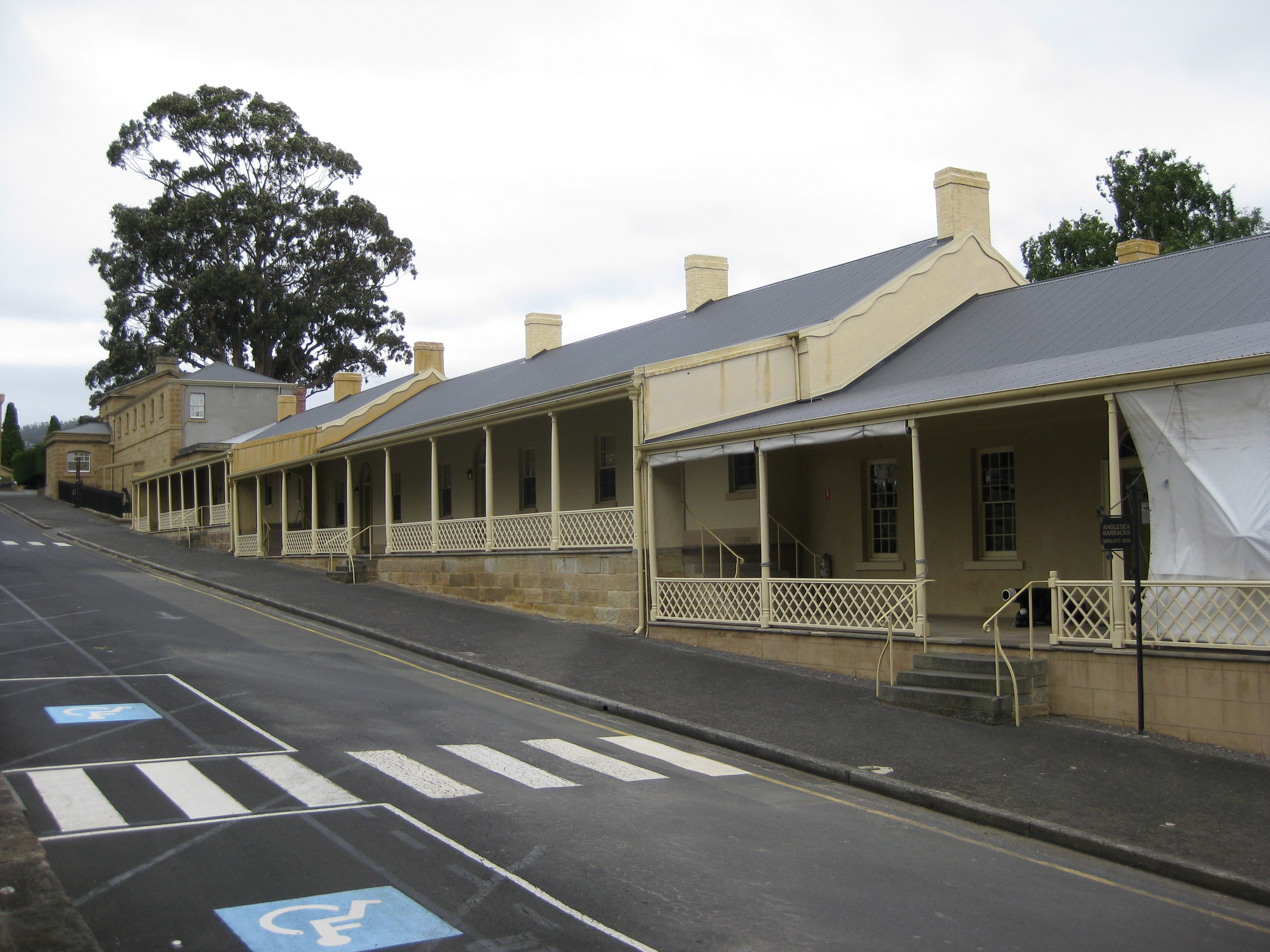
The Sergeants' Mess in 2010

The barracks contains an Officers' Mess and Sergeants' Mess.

=== Other facilities ===
It also houses, in the old jail, the Army Museum of Tasmania.

The site is also home to one of two Defence National Contact Centres; the other is located in Cooma, NSW.
