= Jack Carington Smith =

Australian artist

Jack Carington Smith (26 February 1908 – 19 March 1972) was an Australian artist from Launceston, Tasmania. Born simply "Smith", he adopted "Carington Smith" as his surname around 1936 when he won a travelling scholarship which enabled him to study at the Royal Academy of Arts, London.

He was head of the art department, Hobart Technical College from 1940 to 1970 during which time it was renamed Tasmanian School of Art, a faculty of the University of Tasmania.

He won the Sulman Prize in 1949 for Bush Pastoral, a Mural design for New State Building, Hobart, and (after entering regularly for twenty years) the Archibald Prize in 1963 with a portrait of Professor James McAuley, who was then the chair of the University of Tasmania, and the Rubinstein Prize 1966. Smith also worked as a tutor who taught other artists, including Max Angus, Roger Murphy and Jeff Hook.

The Carington Smith Library in the Centre for the Arts, University of Tasmania is named for him.

Awards
Preceded by Louis Kahan	Archibald Prize; 1963 for Professor James McAuley	Succeeded by Not awarded (Clifton Pugh, 1965)
