= Lenah Valley =

Lenah Valley Hobart, Tasmania
- Coordinates: 42°51′56″S 147°16′54″E
- Population: 5,940 (2016 census)
- Established: 1922
- Postcode(s): 7008
- LGA(s): City of Hobart, City of Glenorchy
- State electorate(s): Clark
- Federal division(s): Clark
Suburbs around Lenah Valley:
Merton	West Moonah	West Moonah
	Lenah Valley	New Town
		Mount Stuart

Lenah Valley is a suburb of Hobart, Tasmania. It is situated in the foothills of Mount Wellington, west of the CBD between Mount Stuart, New Town and the City of Glenorchy.

Lenah Valley was originally known as Kangaroo Bottom, later Kangaroo Valley and Sassafras Valley. The suburb was amalgamated as Lenah Valley in 1922. Lenah is the Muwinina word for kangaroo.

== History ==
The eastern end of Lenah Valley was first settled near the older area of Mount Stuart, when the first land grants were issued for agricultural purposes in 1817. The Newlands manor house was built in the late 1830s and had surrounding agricultural interest such as orchards. The manor house influenced development of the surrounding area and ensured that quality homes were built in the surrounding area in order to maintain the reputation of the area. It is currently used as a venue for events such as wedding receptions. Newlands House is now officially in the suburb of Mount Stuart.

James Sherwin established one of Australia's earliest commercial potteries in 1831 along Pottery Road, Lenah Valley.

In 1839, Lady Jane Franklin purchased 130 acres (53 ha) of land in Lenah Valley with the intent of building a museum and botanical garden, which she named Ancanthe, Ancient Greek for "blooming valley". Built at her own expense in the Greek revivalist style with convict labour, the sandstone museum opened to the public on the 26th October, 1843. The Art Society of Tasmania has operated from the Lady Franklin Gallery since 1949.

== Facilities ==
The main arterial thoroughfares are Augusta Road, Creek Road, Lenah Valley Road and Girrabong Road. Lenah Valley Primary School and Immaculate Heart of Mary Primary School are found in the area.

Businesses include Calvary Hospital, the Pura Milk factory (formerly Tasmaid and during the 1960s and early-1970s known as "Baker's Milk"), a brickworks (no longer producing, with the land currently being redeveloped for residential purposes) and a number of private services providers. A small retail shopping strip is found on Augusta Road.

John Turnbull Park is the main recreational area, with another bushland reserve at Ancanthe Park, home of the Lady Franklin Gallery.
