= Lucien Dechaineux =

20th-century Australian painter

- Portrait by Jack Carington Smith
- Born: Florent Vincent Emile Lucien Dechaineux; 15 July 1869; Liège, Belgium
- Died: 4 April 1957 (aged 87); Hobart, Tasmania, Australia
- Known for: Painting

Florent Vincent Emile Lucien Dechaineux (15 July 1869 – 4 April 1957) was a Belgian-born Australian artist active in Tasmania.

== Early life ==
Dechaineux was born on 15 July 1869 in Liège, Belgium to François Prosper Dechaineux and his wife Josephine Leopold Leontine (née Houet). The family emigrated to Australia in 1884, after failing in their fruit-farming and gold-mining endeavours. Dechaineux attended the Sydney Technical College from 1885 to 1888, where he came under the tutelage of house painter Lucien Henry. Dechaineux subsequently took lessons from Julian Ashton at the Art Society of New South Wales, while focusing on architecture and design, and eventually took over Henry as a design lecturer at the Sydney Technical College.

== Personal life and career ==
On 23 December 1891 Dechaineux married Tasmanian-born Isabella "Ella" Jane Briant at St John's Church of England in Darlinghurst. They had a son and a daughter. In 1895, he became a technical art instructor at the Launceston Technical School in Tasmania and in 1907, he was appointed as principal of the Hobart Technical School, at which he continued to be an art lecturer. His wife died in 1908 and he remarried on 21 December 1909; his second wife, Mary Giblin was also an artist who specialised in oil painting. They had a son and a daughter. Dechaineux remained as principal-cum-teacher at the school until his retirement in December 1939. He was also a member of the Architects' Registration Board and a drawing examiner at the University of Tasmania. Together with his second wife, Dechaineux organised debating and reading clubs. His first son, Captain Emile Frank Verlaine Dechaineux died in battle while commanding HMAS Australia in 1944.

== Death ==
Dechaienux died on 4 April 1957 in Hobart and was buried at Cornelian Bay Cemetery. A portrait of Dechaineux by Jack Carington Smith is housed at the Tasmanian Art Gallery. In 1956, the Hobart Technical College named an extension of its campus after Dechaineux.
