= Tasmanian Museum & Art Gallery =

Art and history museum in Hobart, Australia

Coordinates: 42.8819°S 147.3319°E

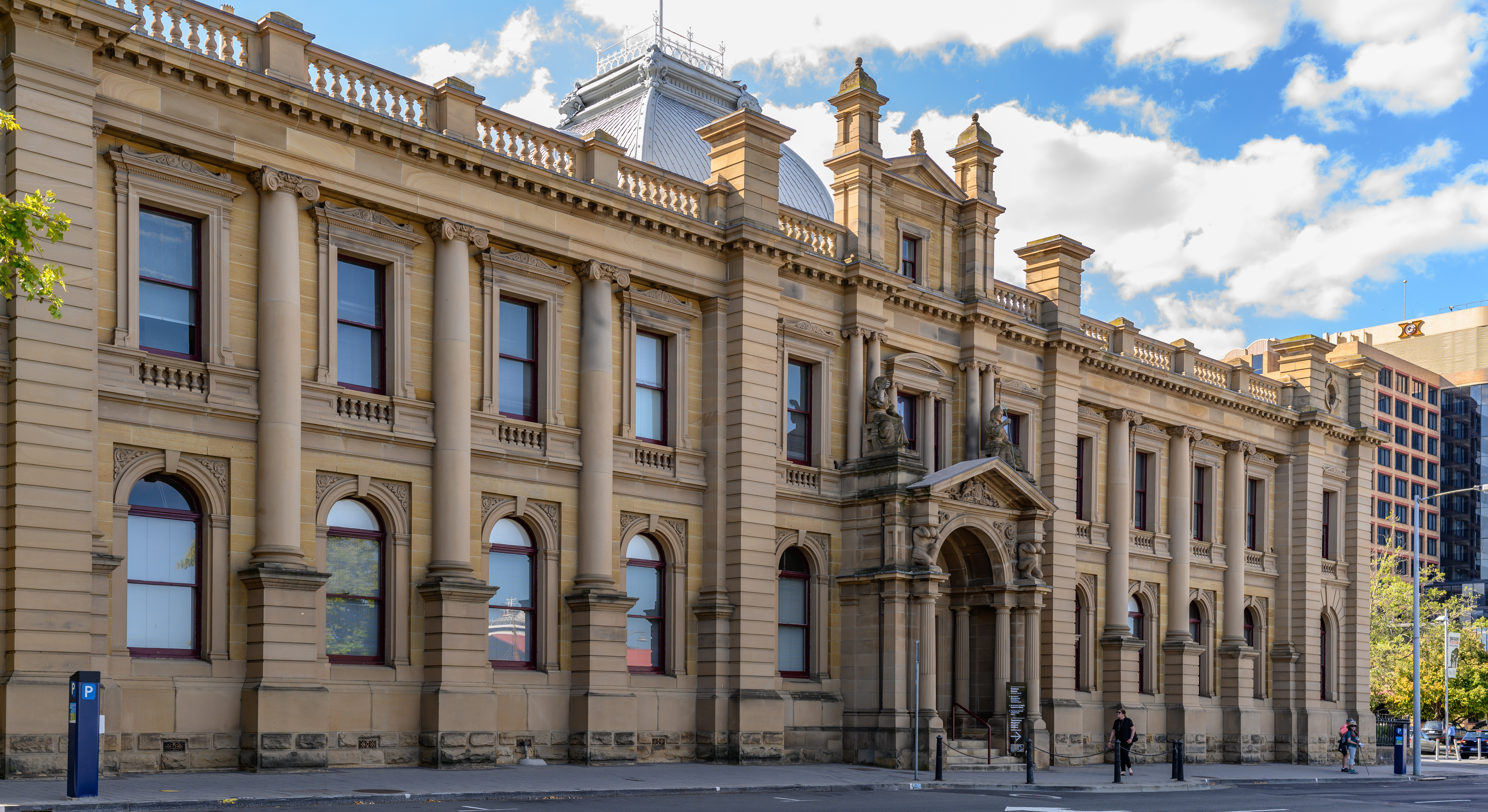
- Established: 1843
- Location: Hobart, Tasmania, Australia
- Visitors: 400,000
- Director: Ms Mary Mulcahy
- Website: www.tmag.tas.gov.au

Tasmanian Heritage Register
- Place ID: 6,648
- Status: Permanently Registered

The Tasmanian Museum & Art Gallery (TMAG) is a museum located in Hobart, Tasmania, Australia. The museum was established in 1846, by the Royal Society of Tasmania, the oldest Royal Society outside England. The TMAG receives 400,000 visitors annually.

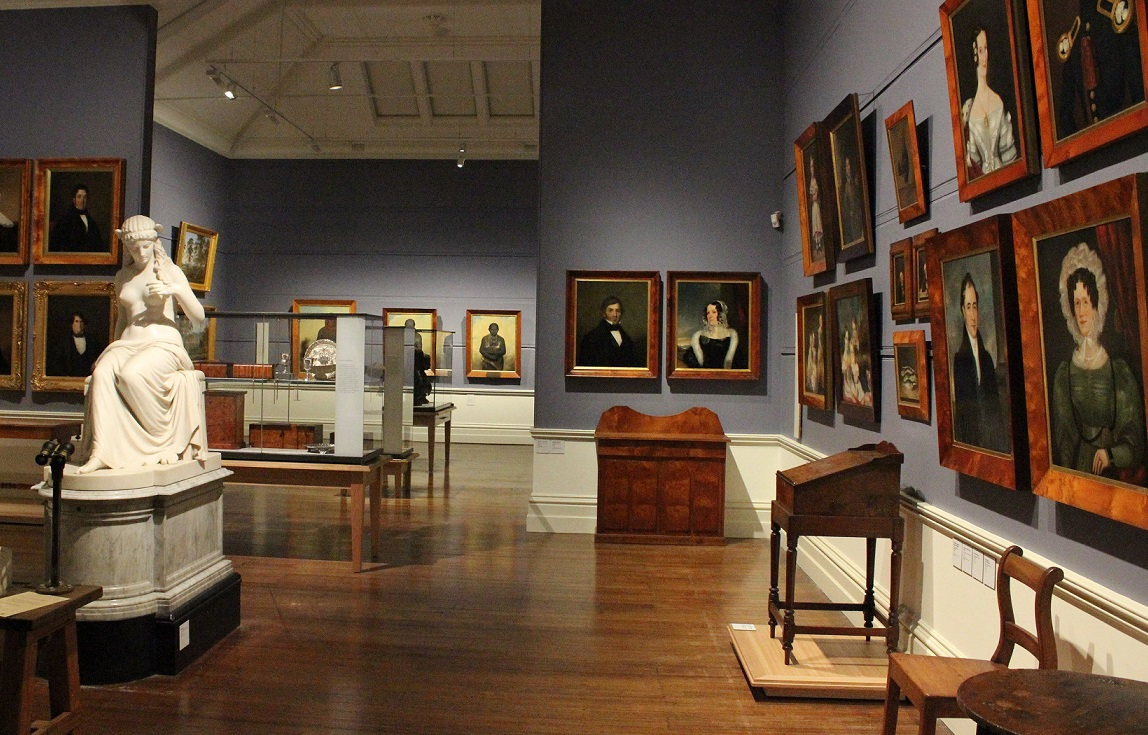
The Henry Hunter gallery

== History ==
The museum was officially created in 1848, though the collections it housed were much created earlier. It merged a number of disparate collections, including that of the Royal Society of Tasmania. The Mechanics' Institution of Hobart, Van Diemen's Land Agricultural Society and Van Diemen's Land Scientific Society had each attempted to found a museum earlier than this date, the most successful of these being the Mechanics' Institution, but little record remains of what happened to these efforts.

Sir John Eardley-Wilmot, 1st Baronet, during his period was Lt. Governor of Tasmania, did much of the work that led to the modern museum. The museum was noted as first being an established institution in the 1848 minutes of the Royal Society of Tasmania, though Wilmot had done most of the work in 1843 and had attempted to set up a museum in the cottage of the Secretary of the Governor, in what is now the Royal Tasmanian Botanical Gardens. In 1838 the Mechanics' Institution received an agreement from the government for a room to be constructed in the Customs House for use as a museum. Customs House was later requisitioned by the Legislative Council of Tasmania and became Parliament House, Hobart. The Royal Society of Tasmania later founded TMAG in the sub-committee room of the Parliament, possibly the same room.

The museum moved to Harrington St in 1852, where it paid £60 a year in rent for a hall there. In 1853 the governor placed before the Legislative Council a debate on the state granting a plot of land for the building of a permanent museum building. In 1854 the museum attracted over 1000 visitors in a year for the first time. In 1855 the Lady Franklin Museum, founded in 1842 at Acanthe Park (now Lenah Valley), sold its fittings and collection to the Royal Society and these were added to the TMAG. The acquisition was driven by the donation of a large geology collection by Joseph Milligan.

In 1861 after a number of years, funding was acquired from the state government to construct a museum on the corner of Argyle and Macquarie Streets, and the Royal Society hosted an architectural contest. Henry Hunter won and was awarded the contract to design a permanent building for the museum. Henry Young, Governor of Tasmania, laid the cornerstone in that year. The Museum was completed by 1862 and a celebratory art exhibition was hosted by Morton Allport, Henry Hunter and a Captain F. E. Chesney. The art exhibition's objective was to raise money for internal fittings of the building, as the money allocated by the state had only covered construction of the building. In 1884 Alexander Morton, previously Assistant Curator of the Australian Museum, was appointed curator.

In 1885 the museum was passed from the Royal Society of Tasmania to the a board of trustees under the state government, with a yearly endowment of £500. Until this point it was officially named The Royal Society's Museum. The Royal Society granted the Royal Botanical Gardens, Hobart to the state government at the same time, and they became known as the Tasmanian Museum and Botanical Gardens in that year. Adye Douglas, Premier of Tasmania, was elected Chair of the Board and Alexander Morton was reelected curator and secretary with an annual salary of £200.

In 1889 a new wing was opened by R Hamilton to extend the museum. In 1890 Betsey Island, then Franklin Island, was granted to the Trustees of the Museum. Since then the Museum has expanded to occupy all the buildings in the block, including the 1810 Commissariat Store, and the 1902 Customs House facing Davey Street.

In 1952 the boards of the Botanical Gardens and the Museum were split and the museum assumed its modern name. An act of Parliament was passed to make this so.

== Governance ==
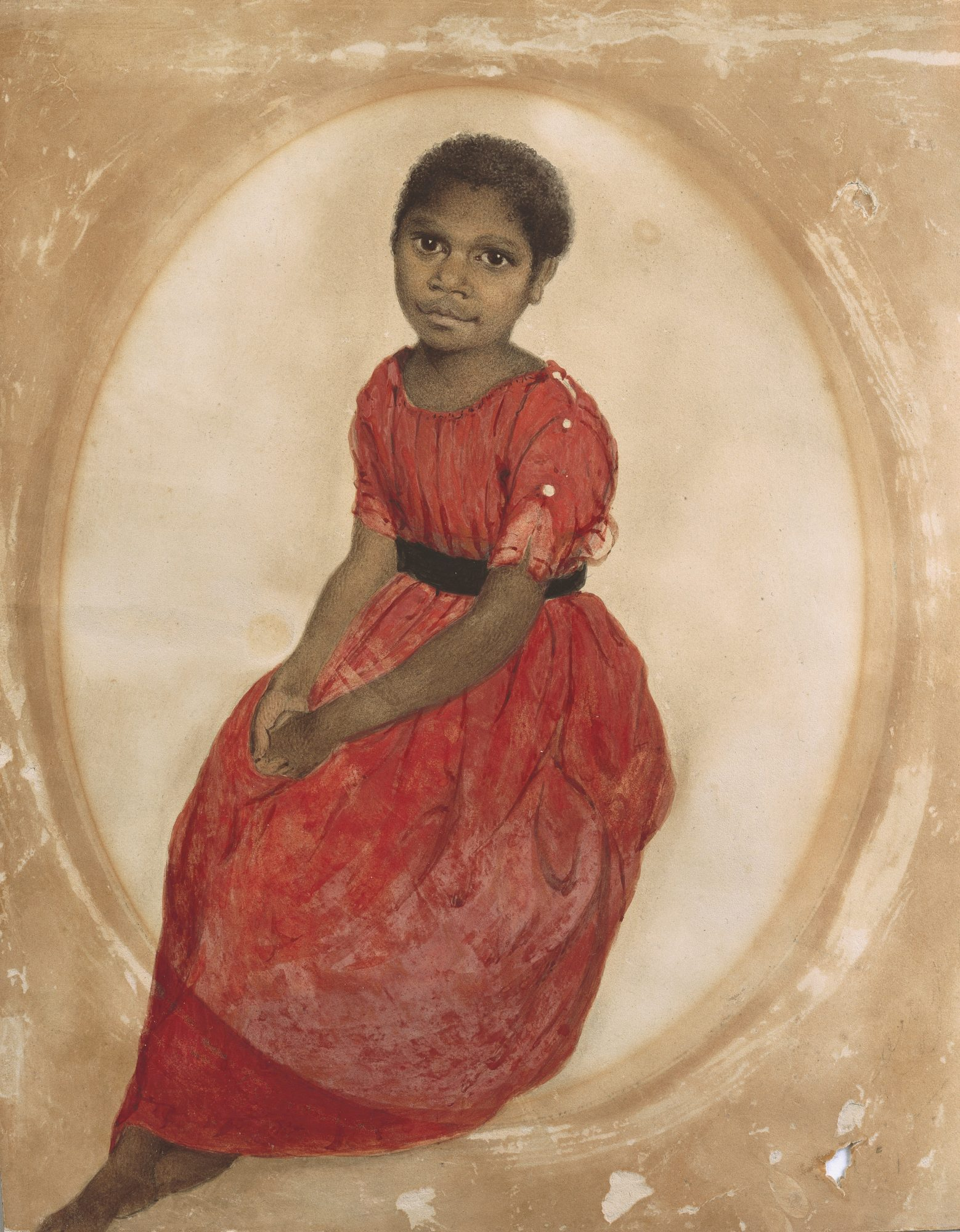
Mathinna (1842) by Thomas Bock, part of the museum's collection

In 1885, TMAG became a Government authority under the control of a board of trustees that also controlled the Royal Tasmanian Botanical Gardens. By statute, it is now controlled by a board of trustees, and is currently part of Building Tasmania.

=== Associated bodies ===
TMAG has a number of associated bodies. The Foundation of the Tasmanian Museum and Art Gallery serves as the primary fundraising body for the TMAG. The Friends of the Tasmanian Museum and Art Gallery works to encourage community engagement with the museum, along with its youth-focused counterpart TMAGgots. The Royal Society of Tasmania founded the museum, donating much of its collection, and continues to loan a significant number of pieces.

== Other facilities ==
In addition to the main campus, TMAG includes three external sites: a herbarium, a storage and research facility, and the Moonah Workshop.

=== State collection ===
The museum and art gallery reopened to the public on 15 March 2013, after a four-month closure for redevelopment works.

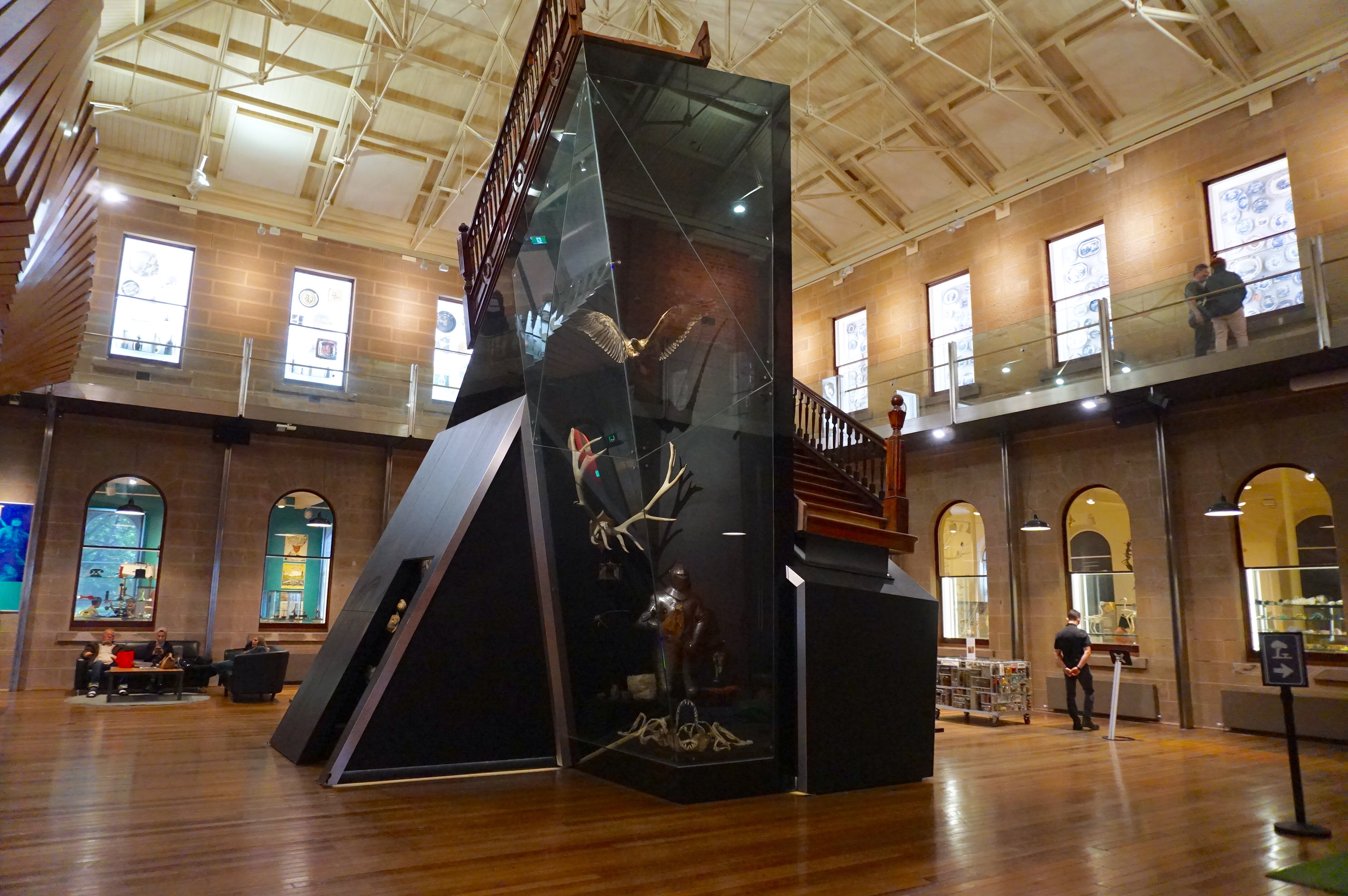
TMAG in 2014

== See also ==
- List of museums in Tasmania
- National Gallery of Australia
- National Gallery of Victoria
- Queensland Art Gallery
- Art Gallery of South Australia
- Art Gallery of Western Australia
- Art Gallery of New South Wales
