= Julian Ashton =

Australian artist (1851–1942)

Julian Ashton CBE
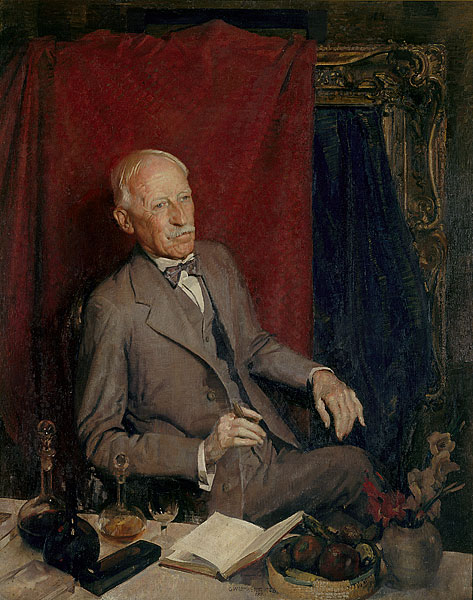
- Portrait of Ashton by George Washington Lambert, 1928, Art Gallery of New South Wales
- Born: Julian Rossi Ashton; 27 January 1851; Addlestone, Surrey, England
- Died: 27 April 1942 (aged 91); Bondi, Sydney, New South Wales, Australia
- Known for: Art patron; teacher; landscape and portraiture; Julian Ashton Art School
- Movement: Heidelberg School
- Spouses: Eliza Ann Pugh (m. 1876; d. 15 July 1900); (Constance) Irene Morley (m. 1902; d. 1946)
- Elected: Trustee, Art Gallery of New South Wales

Julian Rossi Ashton CBE (27 January 1851 – 27 April 1942) was an English-born Australian artist and teacher. He is best known for founding the Julian Ashton Art School in Sydney and encouraging Australian painters to capture local life and scenery en plein air, greatly influencing the impressionist Heidelberg School movement.

He was a principal organiser of the 1898 Exhibition of Australian Art in London, the first major exhibition of Australian art internationally.

== Biography ==
Ashton was born in Addlestone, Surrey, the son of American amateur painter Thomas Briggs Ashton, and his wife Henrietta, daughter of Count Carlo Rossi, a Sardinian diplomat who married the soprano Henriette Sontag. The family moved to Penzance, Cornwall shortly after, and lived at Burley Grove, Gulval. At the age of 11, the family moved again to Totnes, Devon. His father died in 1864, and around age 15 he began working in the engineers' office of either the Great Western Railway or Great Eastern Railway. There he remained for six years using his entire leisure time painting at South Kensington. During this time he studied at the West London School of Art for three years. He then went to study at the Académie Julian in Paris and began illustrating books. He also had considerable success as a painter, exhibiting at the Royal Academy of Arts and elsewhere.

Ashton emigrated to Melbourne in 1878 under contract to David Syme's Illustrated Australian News and lived there for five years before moving to Sydney.

He was the elected president of the Art Society of New South Wales from 1886 to 1892. From 1892 to 1895, he taught classes on behalf of the society but was dismissed after choosing to exhibit his works with the newly formed Society of Artists.

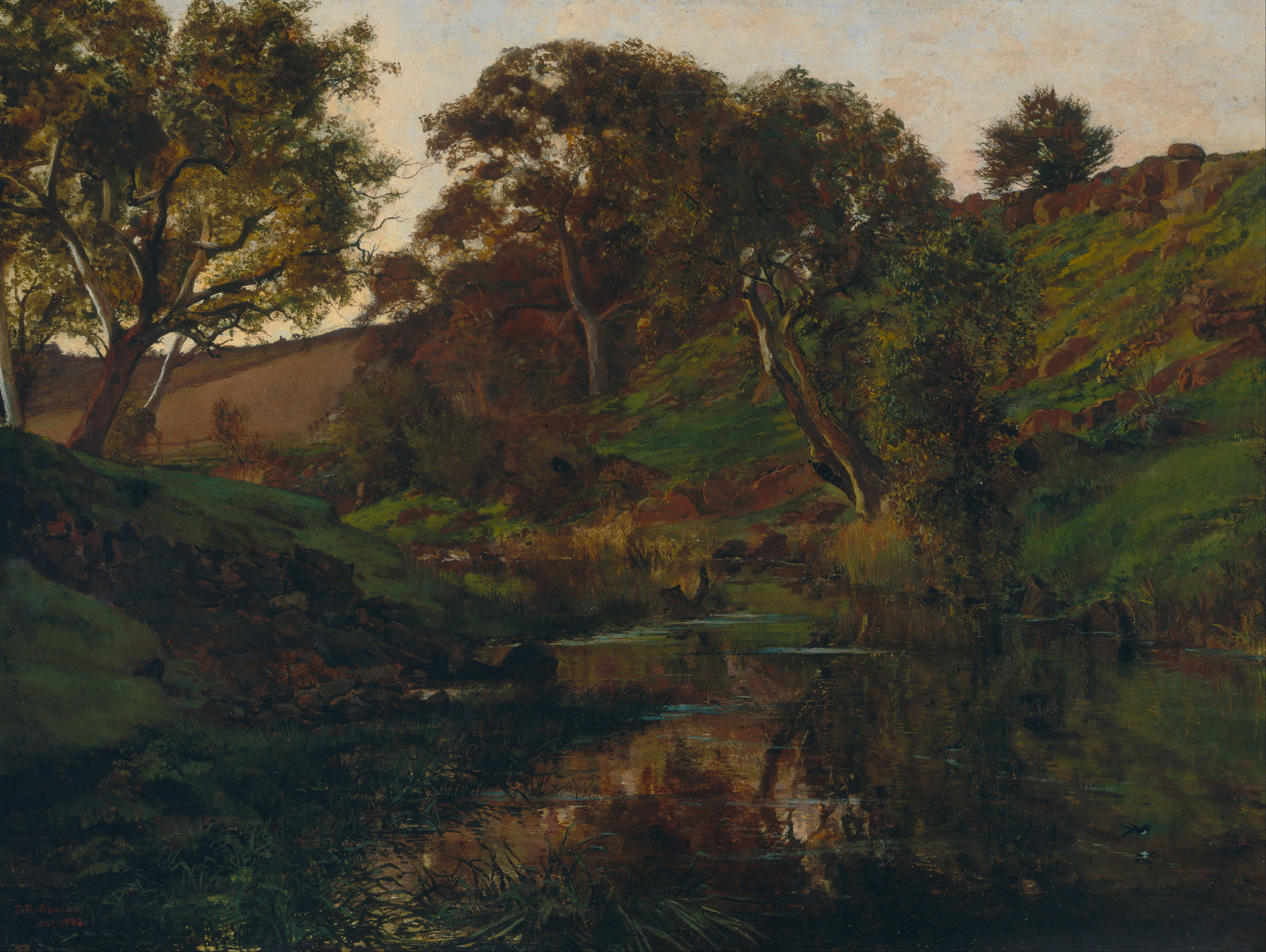
Ashton's Evening, Merri Creek (1882), held at the Art Gallery of New South Wales, was claimed by the artist to be the first true plein air landscape painted in Australia.

He had a background in the contemporary French realism of the Barbizon School, which emphasised painting en plein air (i.e. direct from nature, as opposed to studio-based painting), and which laid the basis for the Impressionist movement. As a trustee of the Art Gallery of New South Wales he championed emerging Australian artists of the Australian Impressionist or Heidelberg School, and the Gallery's decision to collect these works owes much to his influence. Ashton is known for his paintings Evening, Merri Creek (1882), A Solitary Ramble (1888) and others.

George Lambert painted a portrait of Ashton which is in the Art Gallery of New South Wales. Lambert showed Ashton, then 77, with white hair and a military-type moustache, dressed in a grey suit and a dapper bow-tie, cigar in hand, sitting beside a table with a mass of objects. The cigar and wine suggest 'good living' and the flowers and fruit may have referred to Ashton's role as a gardener. Behind him there is a deep red curtain draped over a gold picture frame, behind which there is a curtain, creating an abstract arrangement of bold colours, with the frame suggesting Ashton's role as an artist, teacher and patron.

== Julian Ashton Art School ==
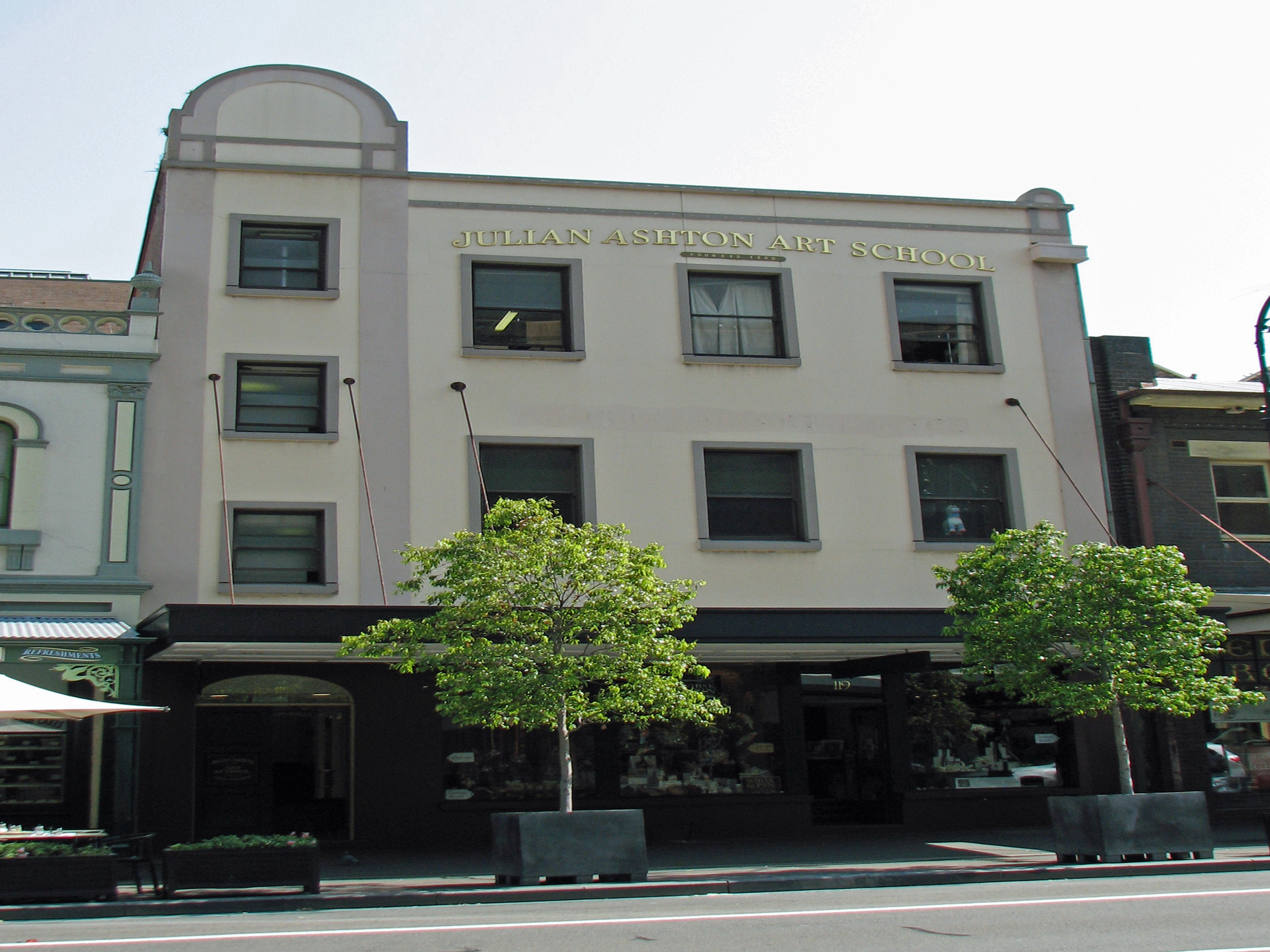
Julian Ashton Art School building, George Street, The Rocks

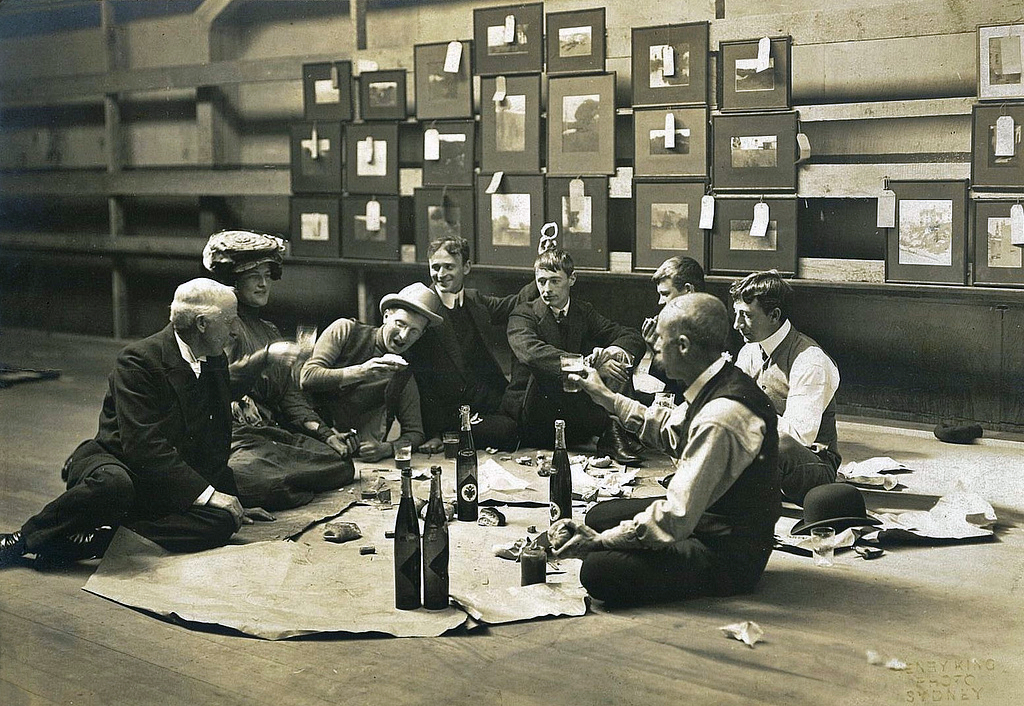
Photograph by Henry King showing members of the Society of Artists in 1907, including Ashton (far left) and Norman Lindsay (fifth from left)

The Sydney Art School (also known as the Julian Ashton Art School), which Ashton established in 1890 as the "Academy Julian", has been an influential art school in Australia.

Julian Ashton students have included William Dobell, John Olsen, Fred Leist, Brett Whiteley, Lola Ridge, Justine Kong Sing, Anne Dangar, and Nora Heysen.

(Julian) Howard Ashton's son, J. Richard Ashton, and his wife Wenda ran the School from 1960, when, among many gifted artists, Ian Chapman and Archibald Prize winner Francis Giacco attended, until 1977 when Phillip Ashton (Richard's son) became Principal, this being the time of Hadyn Wilson, political cartoonist Bill Leak and artist Paul Newton.

In 1988 the school was incorporated and Paul Delprat, Julian Ashton's great-grandson, himself an ex-student took over the running of the school, becoming the principal. In 1989 the school's antique casts and easels, which date back to 1890, were classified by the National Trust. The school's main campus is in The Rocks, Sydney, located opposite the Museum of Contemporary Art Australia at 117–119 George Street, The Rocks. The building is listed on the New South Wales State Heritage Register. Since 2004 the school has also conducted classes at Headland Park, Georges Heights, Mosman.

== Family ==
Ashton married twice: to Eliza Ann Pugh (died 15 July 1900) in Hackney, London on 1 August 1876, by whom he had four sons and a daughter.

- (J)ulian Howard Ashton (9 August 1877 – 30 April 1964), journalist, artist, and writer and critic.
- Rupert Rossi Ashton (c. 1885 – 4 March 1895).
- Percy G. Ashton established a plantation in the New Hebrides, before becoming a soldier in World War I. His first wife died in May 1918. He later married jewellery designer Rhoda Wager in March 1920.
- Bertha Ashton married W(illiam) Charlton Hubble (1880 – 17 February 1949) in July 1923. He was the (divorced) ex-husband of Georgina Temperley. Their son Tom Hubble went on to become a farmer and artist of no distinction.

He married again, on 8 September 1902 to (Constance) Irene Morley (died 11 April 1946).

On Monday, 27 April 1942 Ashton died at Bondi, Sydney, aged 91, after a long illness. Until his death he had still been an art teacher to others. The service for the 'Grand Old Man of Australian art' was held at the Northern Suburbs Crematorium on 29 April 1942.

Ashton also had a brother, George Rossi Ashton (born 1857), a black-and-white artist who lived in Australia between the years 1878 and 1893 before returning to London. He married Blanche Brooke Coppin, a daughter of George Coppin, in Melbourne on 23 October 1883.

== Recognition ==
He was appointed a Commander of the Order of the British Empire (CBE) in 1930.

== Selected paintings ==
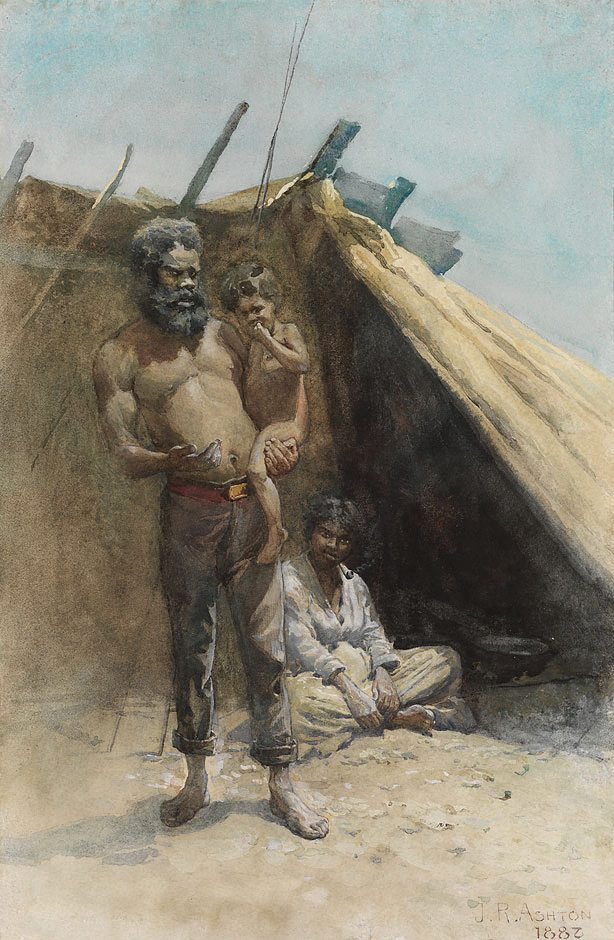
Aboriginal Family Group, 1886, Art Gallery of New South Wales

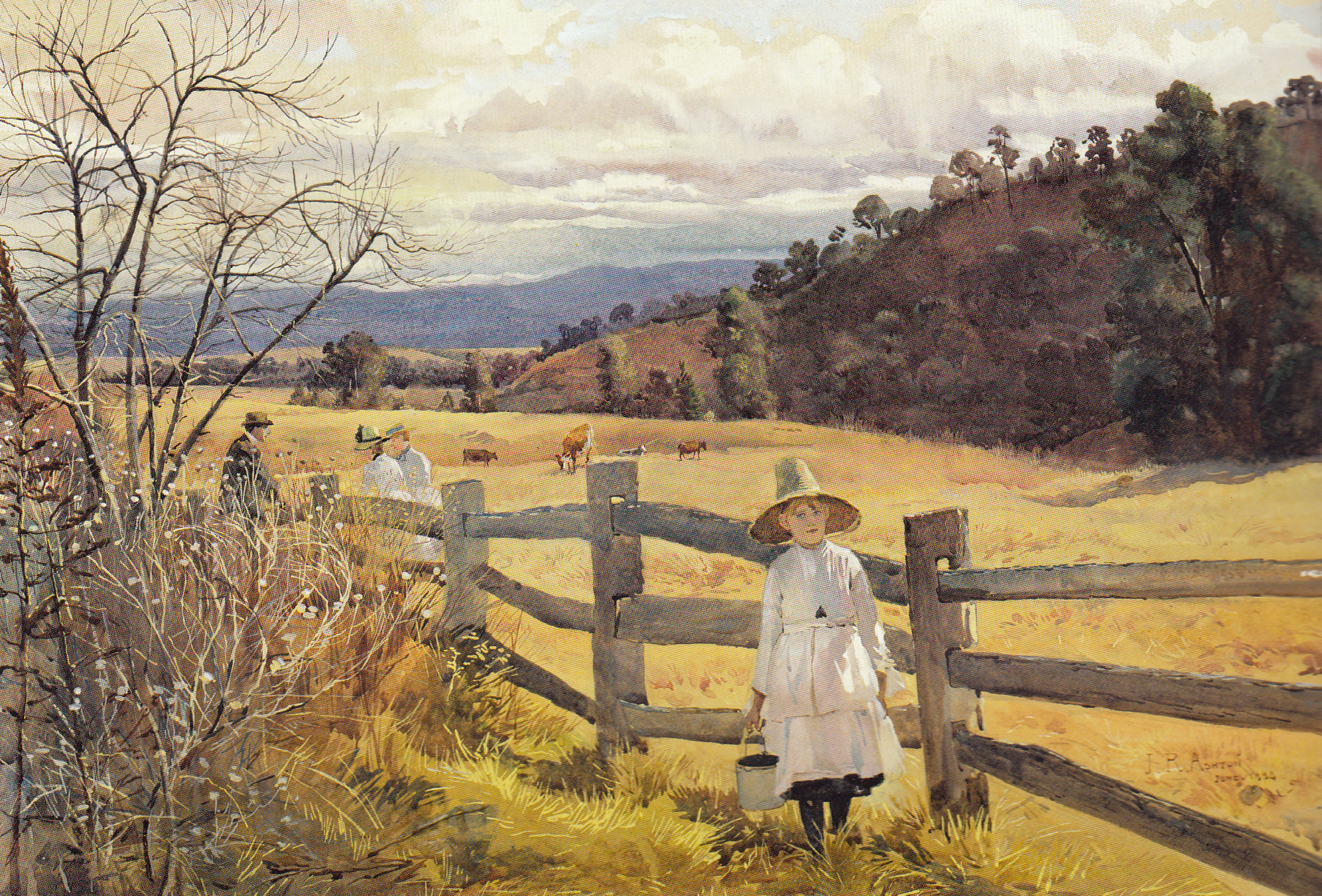
The Corner of the Paddock, 1888, National Gallery of Victoria

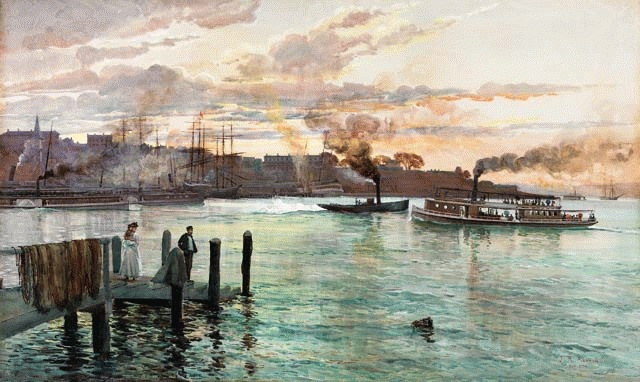
Circular Quay, Sydney, 1888, private collection

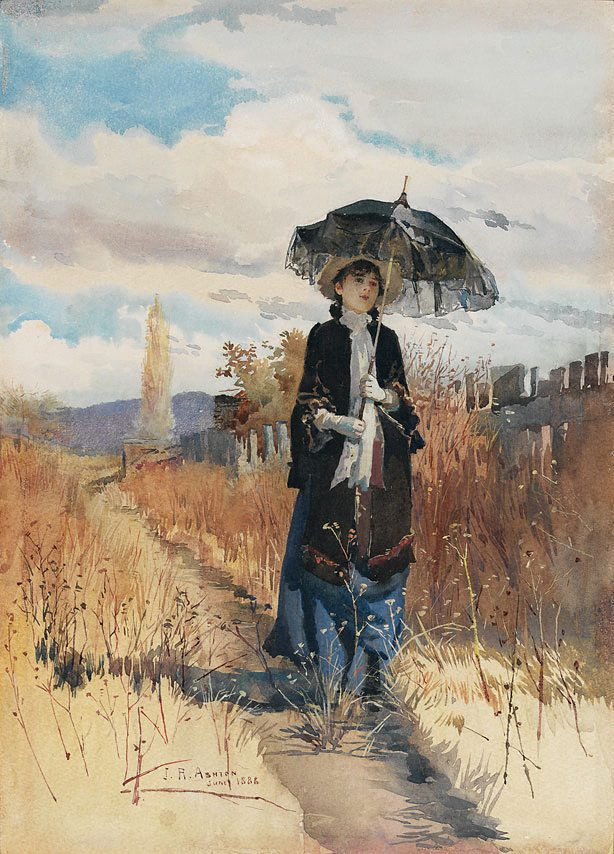
A Solitary Ramble, 1888, Art Gallery of New South Wales

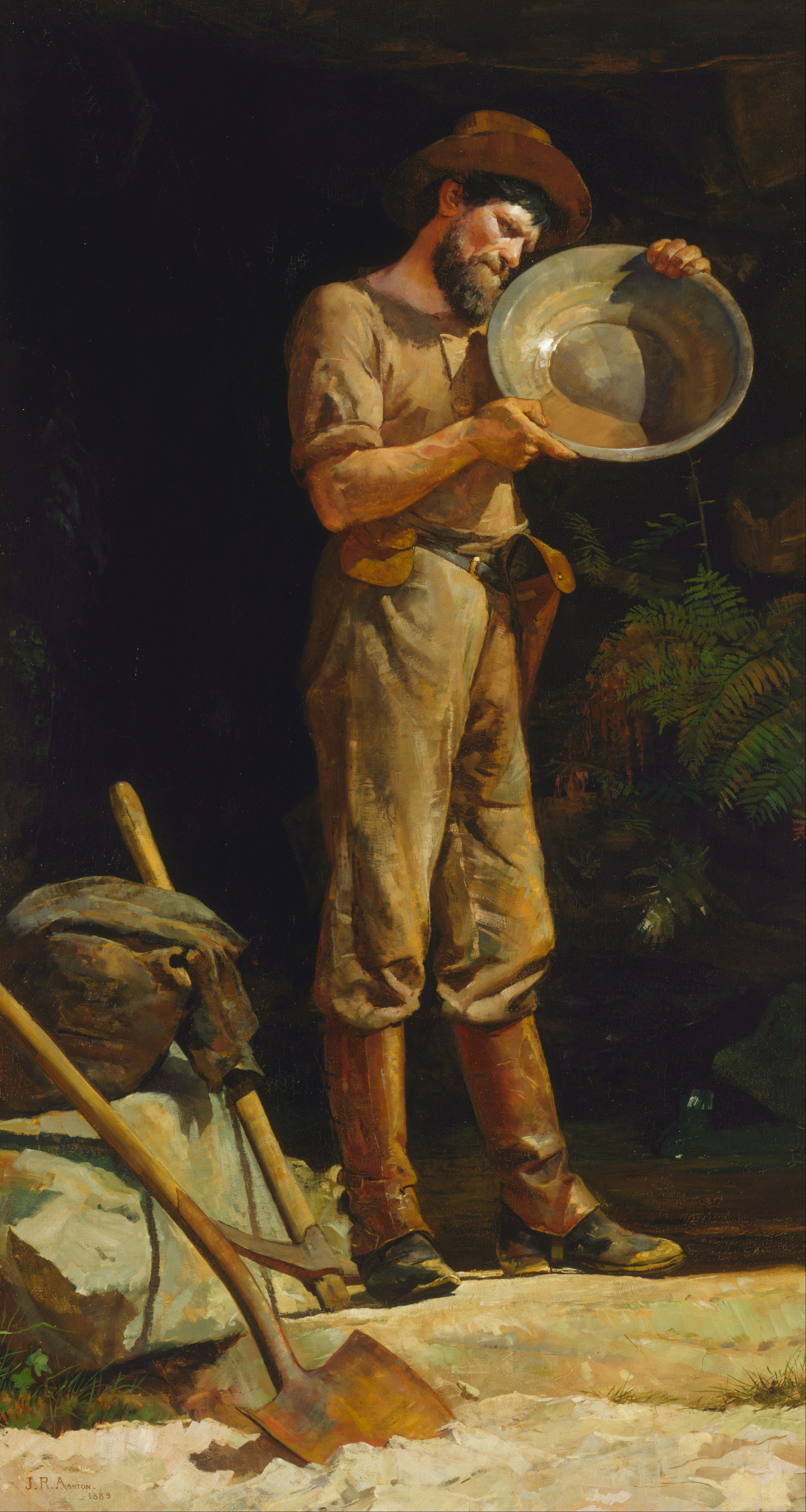
The Prospector, 1889, Art Gallery of New South Wales

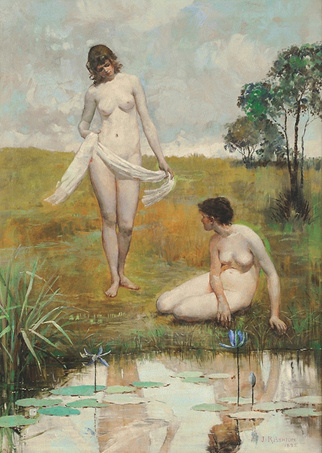
Reflections, 1892, private collection

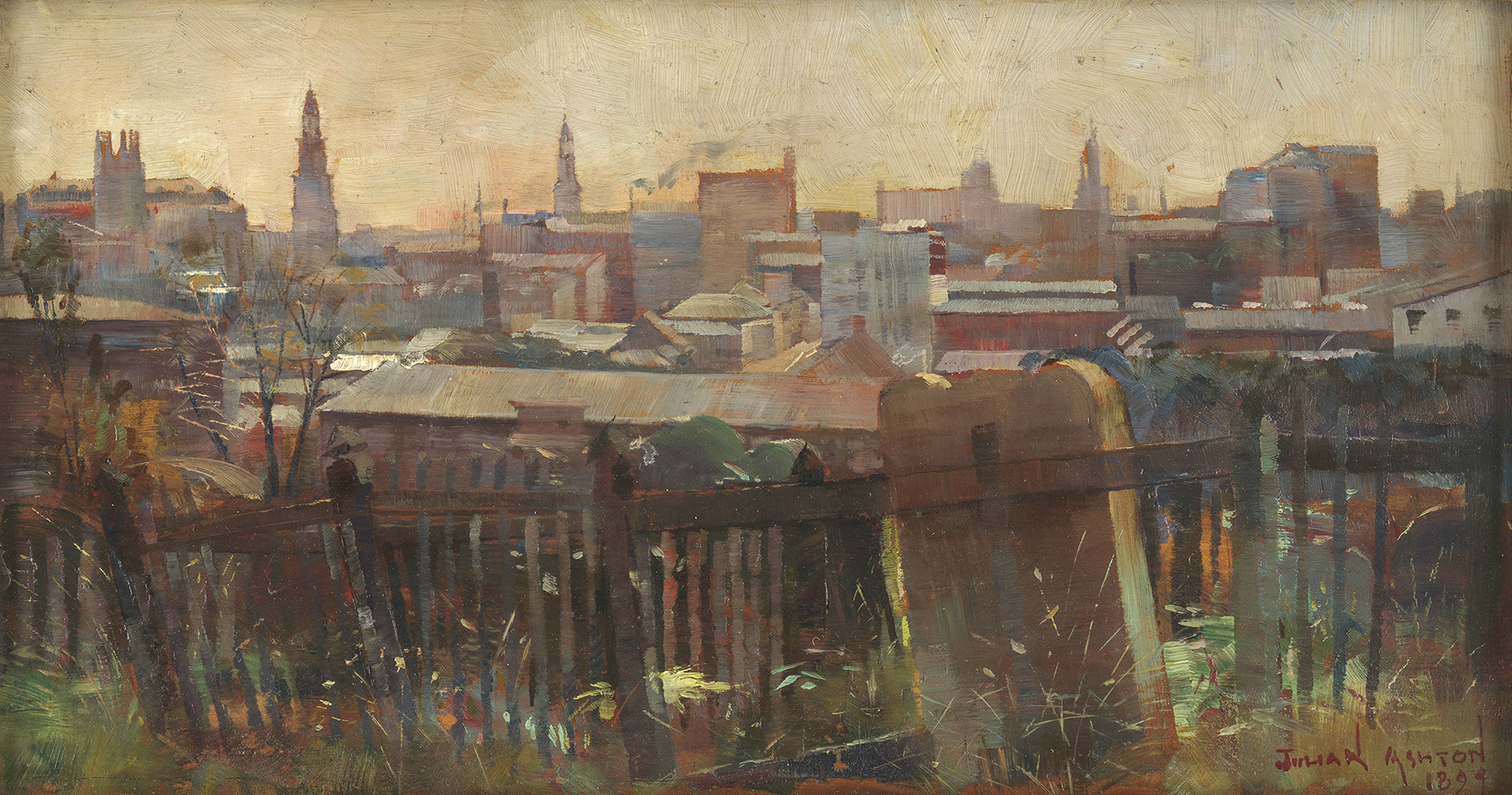
The Old Cemetery, Devonshire Street, 1894, State Library of New South Wales

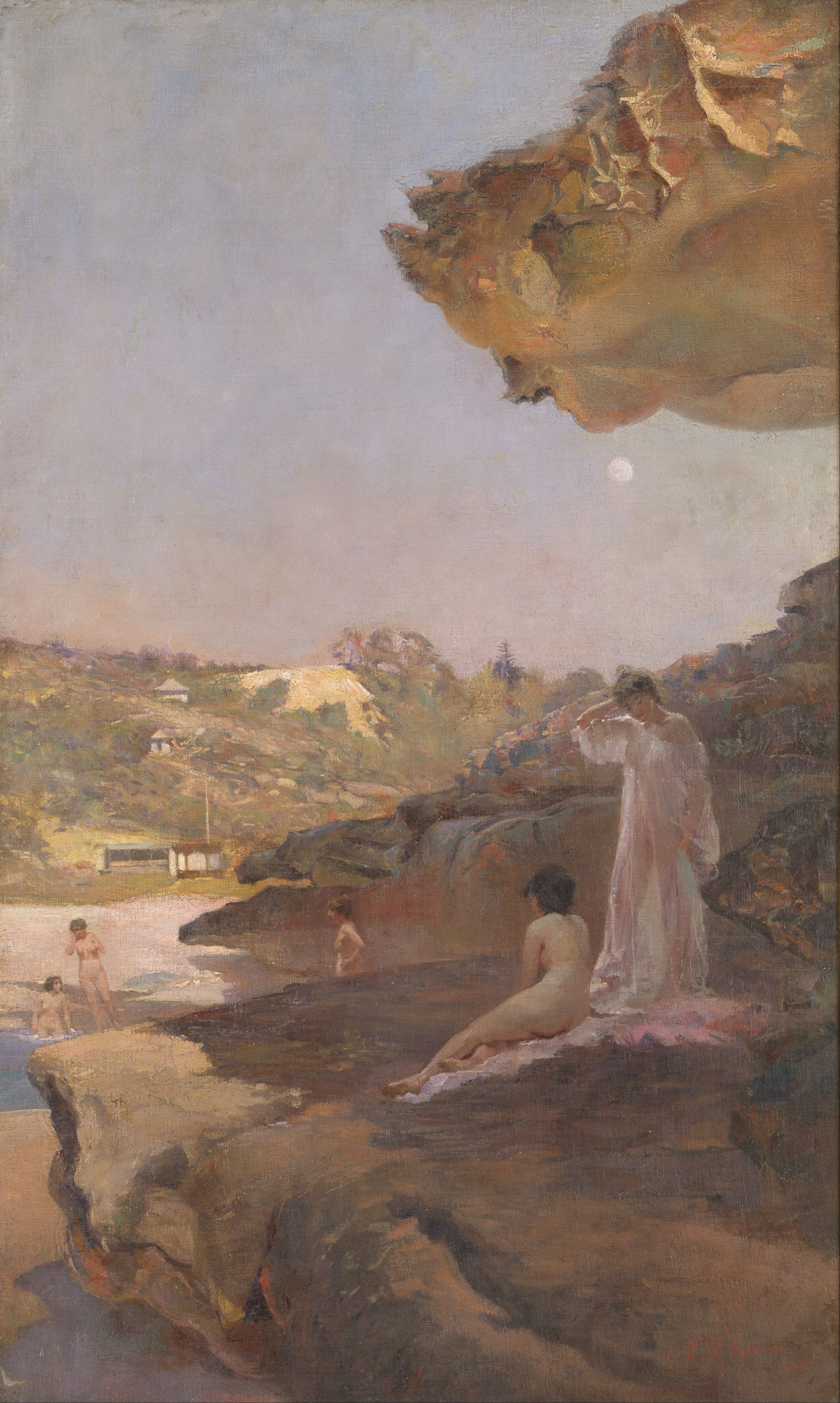
Tamarama Beach, forty years ago, a summer morning, 1899, Art Gallery of New South Wales

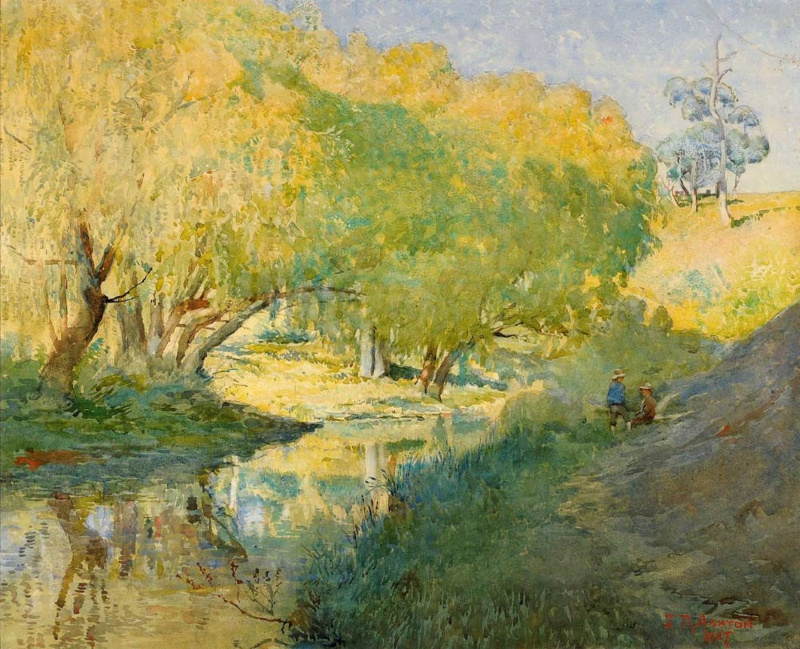
Golden Willows, 1907, New England Regional Art Museum

== Bibliography ==
- Gray, Anne. George W Lambert Retrospective – Heroes and Icons. Canberra: National Gallery of Australia, 2007. ISBN 978-0-642-54121-5.
- Lindsay, Norman; Crowley, Grace; Wilson, W. Hardy; Brennan, Chris; Lindsay, Lionel; Jones, C. Lloyd (1920). The Julian Ashton book. Sydney: Art in Australia.
- Serle, Percival (1949). "Ashton, Julian Rossi". Dictionary of Australian Biography. Sydney: Angus & Robertson.
