= Muriel Binney =

Australian painter (1873–1949)

Muriel Mary Sutherland Binney
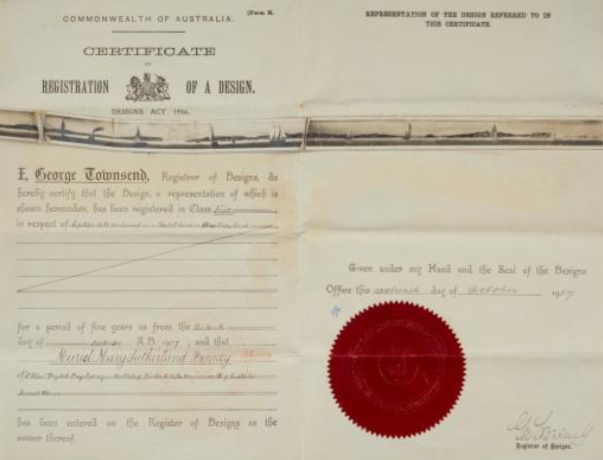
- Registration for Binney's 1907 design (the original had the photo protruding)
- Born: Muriel Mary Sutherland Hasler; 26 December 1873; St Kilda
- Died: 11 May 1949 (aged 75); Parramatta
- Known for: painting and inventing
- Spouse: Edward Binney

Muriel Mary Sutherland Binney born Muriel Hasler (December 26, 1873 – May 11, 1949) was an Australian painter and inventor. She won a silver award for a 19 metre long painting at an international exhibition in 1908 and a silver medal for her inventions in 1929 at the International Exhibition of Inventions.

== Life ==
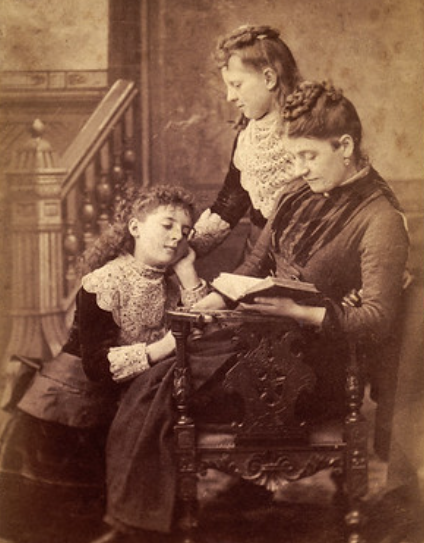
Emily (born O'Shannessy) Hasler and at her feet her daughter Muriel (became Binney) c.1882

Muriel Binney was born in the Melbourne suburb of St Kilda in 1873. Both her parents, Emily (born O'Shannessy) and George Henry Massey Hasler were born in Ireland and involved with photography.

Among the 16,000 exhibits by women from around Australia in the vast 1907 Australian Exhibition of Women's Work in Melbourne organised by the Governor General's wife, Lady Northcote, work by Binney was included, beside paintings by Portia Geach, Eirene Mort, Dora Serle, Ida Rentoul Outhwaite and Agnes Goodsir.

Binney's entry was a huge, almost twenty-metre-wide, mural titled "Sydney Harbour Foreshores at Sunset" which was an entry for the "Best original design for a frieze" in a strongly contested class of 23 other artists. Fletcher comments that 'Muriel Binney's panoramic painting Sydney Harbour Foreshores at Sunset is an example of women's art in an era when maritime painting was dominated by men.'

On the 16 October 1907 she registered for copyright the design of "Sydney Harbour Foreshores at Sunset". She had originally made the watercolour for her own home but then realised that the image might be licensed as a basis for a wallpaper design.

Her work went on to the Franco-British Exhibition in London, where it won the silver prize in 1908. Another entry was a wooden dining set carved by sixty people including members of The Society of Arts and Crafts of NSW and designed by Susanne Gether.

== Inventor ==
Binney was awarded several patents for inventions including a folding cot (1908), a leg prosthesis, and a shoe-stand. Her husband had not supported her interest in inventions. He died in 1927. In 1929 she was in Britain where she presented her ideas to the British Society of Inventors. Some were included in the International Exhibition of Inventions and she was awarded a silver medal. She entered again in 1930 and it was reported that some of her ideas were to be manufactured.

== Legacy ==
Binney died in Parramatta mental hospital in 1949. Her frieze of Sydney harbour was kept by her family in storage. It became part of the Australian National Maritime Museum's collection and in the Museum's 1994/5 annual report is identified as 'the year's largest single conservation project,' sponsored by the Vincent Fairfax Family Foundation for 640 hours of work by paper conservators when it was prepared for exhibition in their What About Women? program. Repairs had to be made to sections of the frieze to replace parts cut out around door frames when it was displayed in Binney's home. In 2002 it was included in the Sydney by Ferry exhibition at the Museum of Sydney.
