= Annie Rattray Rentoul =

Australian lyricist and children's writer (1882–1978)

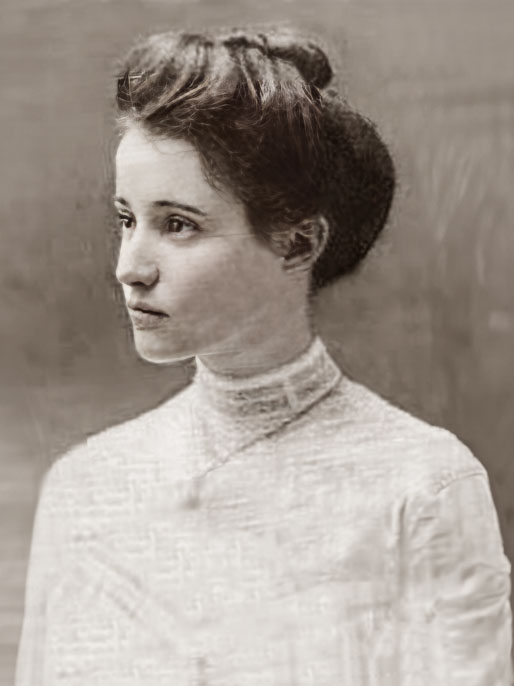
- Rentoul in 1907
- Born: 22 September 1882
- Died: 24 July 1978 (aged 95)
- Occupation: children's story writer; poet; teacher
- Education: Presbyterian Ladies' College, Melbourne
- Alma mater: University of Melbourne

Annie Rattray Rentoul (22 September 1882 – 24 July 1978) was an Australian lyricist and children's poet and story writer, best known for books illustrated by her younger sister, Ida Rentoul Outhwaite.

== Early life and education ==
Born on 22 September 1882, Rentoul was the eldest daughter of Annie Isobel Rattray and John Laurence Rentoul, a poet and Presbyterian minister. She was educated at Presbyterian Ladies' College, Melbourne, matriculating in 1899 and receiving a matriculation exhibition in Greek and Latin in April 1902. She next attended Ormond College at the University of Melbourne where she was joint winner of the Wyselaskie scholarship in Classical and Comparative Philology and Logic for 1905 and graduated with a BA and first class honours in Classical Philology. She was also joint winner of the Higgins poetry prize.

== Career ==
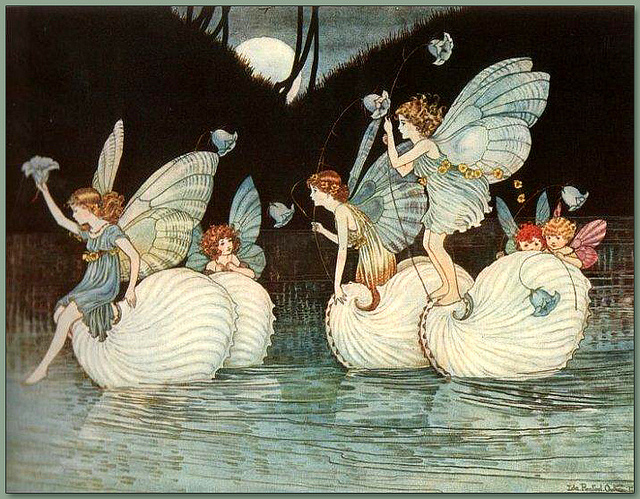
'Fairy Islands' from the book Elves and Fairies, illustrated by Ida Rentoul Outhwaite

Rentoul's first known published work was a poem, "The Comet and the Jook", published in The Bulletin in 1901.

She wrote the words for the Exhibition Ode, "God Guide Australia" set to music by Florence Ewart and performed at the Australian Exhibition of Women's Work held in Melbourne in 1907. An alternative arrangement was composed by Georgette Peterson.

Rentoul wrote a number of children's books that were illustrated by her younger sister, Ida Rentoul Outhwaite. Their 1908 book, The lady of the blue beads, was favourably reviewed by "Gossip" in The Sydney Stock and Station Journal, who wrote "Taking it all round it is a ripping good book, and the Misses Rentoul are to be congratulated on their work, for it is quite original, and emphatically humorous."

She taught classics (Greek, Latin and Ancient History) at Presbyterian Ladies' College from 1913.

In 1915, with her mother and father, who was then chaplain-general of the Australian Defence Forces, she contributed poems to At the Sign of the Sword. Illustrated by her sister, Ida, its sale raised money for soldiers wounded in World War I.

== Selected works ==
- Rentoul, Annie R. (1904), Mollie's bunyip, Outhwaite, Ida Rentoul (illustrator), Robert Jolley
- —— (1907), Australian songs for young and old, Peterson, Georgette (composer); Outhwaite, Ida Rentoul (illustrator), George Robertson
- —— (1908), The lady of the blue beads : her book, being an account of her first blue moon spent on Sun Island, Outhwaite, Ida Rentoul (illustrator) (First ed.), George Robertson & Co
- Rentoul, J. Laurence; Rentoul, Annie Isobel; Rentoul, Annie R. (1915), At the sign of the sword : by four in a family, Outhwaite, Ida Rentoul (illustrator), Melville & Mullen
- —— (1916), Elves and fairies of Ida Rentoul Outhwaite, Outhwaite, Ida Rentoul (illustrator), Lothian Book Publishing
- —— (1922), The little green road to Fairyland, Outhwaite, Ida Rentoul (illustrator), Adam and Charles Black
