= Susanne Gether =

Danish–New Zealand woodcarver

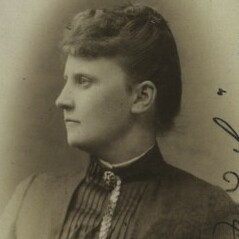
- Born: Susanne Vilhelmine Gether; 14 September 1857; Nexø or Copenhagen
- Died: April 1943 (aged 85); Denmark
- Occupation: Woodcarver
- Known for: her role in The Society of Arts and Crafts of NSW
- Partner(s): Kate Busck; May Barron

Susanne Vilhelmine Gether (1857–1943) was a Danish–New Zealand woodcarver associated with The Society of Arts and Crafts of NSW and the role of women. She left Denmark with Kate Busck and arrived in New Zealand in 1890 and founded a studio for woodcarving in Dunedin. She became a citizen and then left for Sydney where she taught carving and weaving and helped found the society. She left in 1911 with May Barron and died back in Denmark.

== Life ==
Gether was born in Nexø or Copenhagen in 1857. Her parents were Petrea Barbara Jespersen and Jens Johan Gether. She learned about woodcarving in Denmark and about weaving in Switzerland.

She arrived in New Zealand in 1890 with her musical friend Kate Busck and in 1893 she became a New Zealand citizen. She believed that gentle women needed to engage with a more useful activity than just calling on each other and wearing nice clothes. Woodcarving was, she said, "a proper pastime for the highest lady in the land". She arranged courses at her studio and for seven years she taught women about pokerwork, carving and leatherwork in Dunedin. In 1899 she left for Sydney and ended up in King Street where she continued to teach the same skills as she had in New Zealand but she now had a Danish loom.

In 1906 The Society of Arts and Crafts of NSW was founded by six practicing craftspeople in the Sydney suburb of Mosman. Gether joined and, by the December, meetings were being held in Gether's studio. In 1907 the high profile Australian Exhibition of Women's Work took place in Melbourne which had been organised by the Governor General's wife, Lady Northcote. The other artists associated with the Women's Work exhibition included Muriel Mary Sutherland Binney, Portia Geach, Eirene Mort, Dora Serle, Ida Rentoul Outhwaite and Agnes Goodsir.

Gether designed a dining set with six chairs for the exhibition. It was carved from rosewood by the Society's members and over 60 pupils. The dining set was sent to the UK where it was included in the Franco-British Exhibition in 1908.

Gether resigned from the NSW arts and crafts society when she discovered that lots of new members were people interested in crafts not, as she preferred, practicing craftspeople. A campaign was launched to recapture the leadership and Gether rejoined to become vice-president in 1910. However within a few months she resigned again. Gether left Sydney the following year with a piano teacher named May Barron with who she would spend the rest of her life.

== Death and legacy ==
Gether died in Denmark in April 1943 being cared for by May Barron. Over fifty photographs of Gether carving with her students in Dunedin, New Zealand, and in Sydney, are held by the National Library of Australia. They were taken between 1890 and 1911.
