= Portia Geach =

Australian artist, feminist (1873–1959)

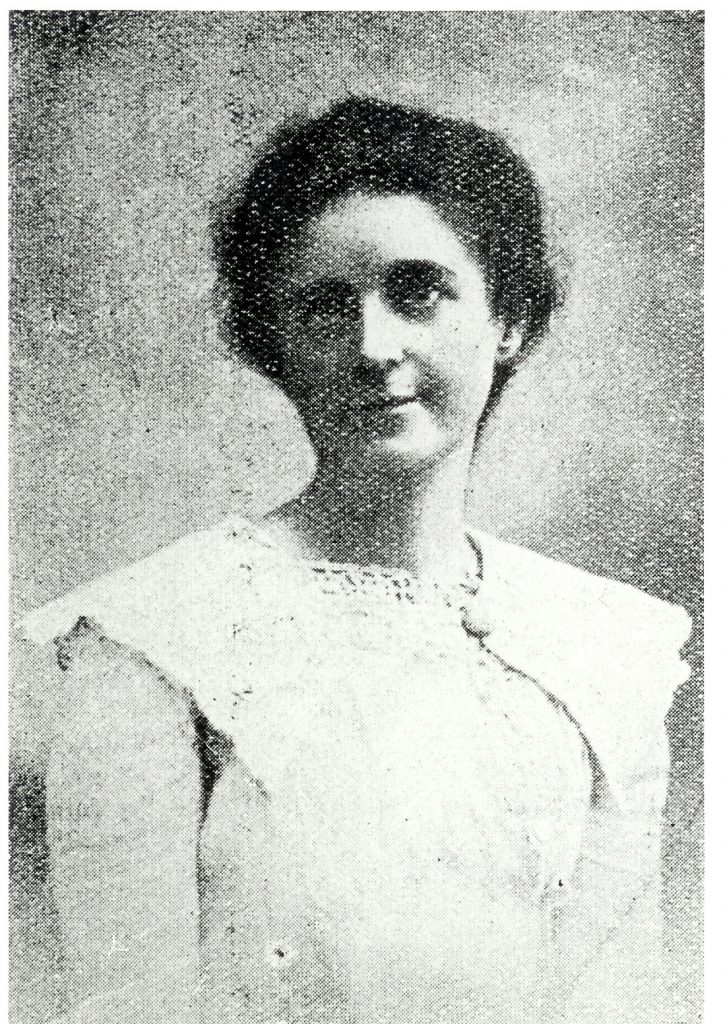
- Born: Portia Swanston Geach; 24 December 1873; Melbourne
- Died: 5 October 1959 (aged 85); Sydney, Australia
- Occupations: Artist, feminist, housewives' advocate
- Years active: 1901–1957
- Known for: Portia Geach Memorial Award, Founder and President, New South Wales Housewives’ Association

Portia Swanston Geach (24 December 1873, Melbourne – 5 October 1959, Sydney) was an Australian artist and feminist. She was a founder and a president of the New South Wales Housewives' Association, as well as a president of the Federal Association of Australian Housewives. The Portia Geach Memorial Award, established by a legacy from Geach's sister, is Australia's most significant prize for Australian female portrait artists.

== Life and education ==
Portia Geach was born on 24 December 1873 and became the fifth surviving child of Cornish parents Edwin Geach, warehouseman and draper, and his wife Catherine, née Greenwood. Geach studied design in 1890–1892 and painting in 1892–1896 at Melbourne's National Gallery School. In 1895 she won second prize for painting from the nude. In 1896 she went to London becoming the first Australian to win a tuition scholarship to the Royal Academy School. She studied there for four years till 1900 under Lawrence Alma-Tadema, John Singer Sargent and other masters. Additionally Geach studied stained glass at the London School of Arts and Crafts, as well as at the Académie Julian in Paris.

In the beginning of 1901 Geach returned to Melbourne and exhibited in her Collins Street studio. Being a member of the Victorian Artists’ Society she also exhibited with it regularly starting from 1901. In 1904 the Geach family moved to Sydney and she divided time between Melbourne and Sydney. Starting from 1906 she exhibited with the Royal Art Society of New South Wales. In 1907 Geach won the second prize for watercolour figure painting with A Procession of the Horses and second prize for etching in the Women's Work exhibition at Melbourne. The other artists associated with the Women's Work exhibition included Susanne Gether, Dora Serle, Ida Rentoul Outhwaite, Muriel Mary Sutherland Binney and Agnes Goodsir.

Starting from 1922 Geach lived in the family house at Cremorne Point in Sydney, until she moved with her sister Florence Katherine to an apartment in The Astor in Macquarie Street in Sydney. In 1926 Geach exhibited with the Société Nationale des Beaux-Arts in Paris. Geach was a natural food advocate and was influenced by the dietary theories of English naturopath writer Reddie Mallett.

Portia Geach died on 5 October 1959 at her home in Sydney. Her body was cremated at the Northern Suburbs Crematorium.

== Feminist activism ==
In 1917 Geach attended the Housewives Association's meeting in New York City and became convinced that a similar organisation was necessary in Australia. On her return to Sydney she founded the New South Wales Housewives’ Association, becoming its president. The Association's aim was to educate women in the principles of proper nutrition and to help them to resist profiteering and rising food prices. In 1928 Geach reorganised the Association as the Housewives’ Progressive Association. For many years Geach was also a president of the Federal Association of Australian Housewives.

In 1925 Geach, as an active representative of the National Council of Women of New South Wales committee, became a delegate to the International Council of Women's conference in Washington, D.C.. Geach campaigned on behalf of women's rights, such as equal pay, the right to hold public office, as well as price and quality control for everyday domestic life. She frequently expressed her views on buying Empire goods, the use of preservatives in foodstuffs, the date-stamping of eggs, the marking of lamb and the high price of bread and milk in the Sydney Morning Herald and over the radio. Geach launched The Housewives Magazine in 1933 and The Progressive Journal in 1935 as her mouthpieces.

In 1938 under the chairmanship of Eleanor Glencross the Housewives' Progressive Association was incorporated while Geach became a director. In 1941, as a result of rivalry with Glencross, Geach and four others, who alleged that the association cooperated with the Meadow-Lea Margarine Co. Pty Ltd, were expelled from the association. In 1947 Geach formed the breakaway Progressive Housewives’ Association and was president until 1957. Starting from 1947 she also served on the council of the Australian Women's Movement against Socialisation.

== Art ==
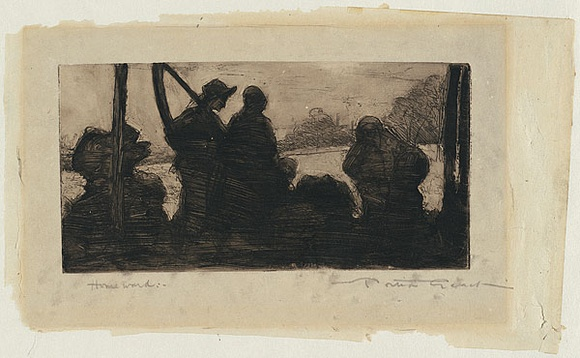
Etching "Homeward" by Portia Geach

Portraits became Geach's specialty and she painted such people as Australian journalist Donald Macdonald, Edith Cowan and (Sir) John Quick. In 1893 she painted the portrait of her father Edwin Geach, which is now in the collection of The Tweed River Art Gallery. She also painted murals, including murals in New York around 1917.

Her work Tales from Tennyson: ‘Queen Guinevere’ was a pictorial realisation of Tennyson’s poem, crossing the boundaries between poetic and visual.

Among her other works should be mentioned A Procession of the Horses, Queen Rose in her Rosebud Garden of Girls, Tahiti, View of a Sailing Barge of the Thames, Homeward and The Sower.

Portia Geach's work was featured in several exhibitions at key galleries and museums including the S.H. Ervin Gallery. Her work has been offered at auction multiple times with the record price $2,195 USA for The Bathers, sold at Shapiro Auctioneers in 2015.

Geach Place, in the Canberra suburb of Chisholm, is named in her honour.

== Portia Geach Memorial Award ==
After Geach's death her estate was left to her sister Florence Kate, who died in 1962 and provided in her will for an annual prize of £1000 for a portrait by a woman artist. The Portia Geach Memorial Award is considered the most significant prize for celebrating the creativity of female portrait artists in Australia.

== Exhibitions ==
- 1901 – Victorian Artists’ Society, Melbourne, Vic.
- 1906 – Royal Art Society of NSW, Sydney, NSW.
- 1907 – Women's Work Exhibition, Exhibition Building, Melbourne, Vic.
- 1926 – Société Nationale des Beaux-Arts Salon, Paris, France.
- 1995 – Women Hold Up Half The Sky, National Gallery of Australia, Canberra, ACT.
- 1995 – Colonial Pastime to Contemporary Profession: 150 years of Australian Women's Art, Tasmanian Museum and Art Gallery, Hobart, Tas.
- 1995 – A l'ombre des jeunes filles et des fleurs: In the shadow of young girls and flowers, Benalla Art Gallery, Benalla, Vic.
- 1995–1996 – The Work of Art: Australian women writers and artists, State Library of New South Wales, Sydney, NSW.
- 2011–2012 – Look, Look Again, Lawrence Wilson Art Gallery, University of Western Australia, Perth, WA.

== Collections ==
- Tasmanian Museum and Art Gallery, Hobart, TAS
- Benalla Art Gallery, Benalla, VIC
- Australian War Memorial, Canberra, ACT
- National Library of Australia, Canberra, ACT
- National Trust S. H. Ervin Gallery, Sydney, NSW
- Mitchell Library, State Library of New South Wales, Sydney, NSW
- WA State Parliament House Art Collection, Perth, WA
- National Gallery of Australia, Canberra, ACT
- Cruthers Collection of Women's Art at the University of Western Australia
- Gippsland Art Gallery, Sale, VIC
