= Alice Mills =

Alice Mills may refer to:

- Alice Tait (née Mills), swimmer from Australia
- Alice Mills (photographer), photographer from Australia
- Alice du Pont Mills, American aviator, thoroughbred race horse breeder and owner, and philanthropist

== See also ==
- Alyce Mills, American actress
