= Georgette Peterson =

Composer, singer and pianist (1863–1947)

- Born: Georgette Augusta Christina Lichtenstein; 1863; Budapest, Hungary
- Died: 19 April 1947 (aged 83–84); Swanage, Dorset, England
- Occupation: Composer

Georgette Augusta Christina Peterson (1863 – 19 April 1947) was a Hungarian-born composer, singer and pianist. Best known as Georgette Peterson, she conducted a choir of 1300 women at the 1907 Australian Exhibition of Women's Work.

== Life ==
Georgette Augusta Christina Lichtenstein was born in Budapest in 1863.

She married Franklin Sievright Peterson in 1890 in Croydon, Surrey. She later accompanied him to Australia where he took up the professorship of music at the University of Melbourne, replacing George Marshall-Hall in 1901.

Peterson conducted the 1300-voice choir of women at the opening of the Australian Exhibition of Women's Work held in Melbourne in 1907. Her orchestration for the Exhibition Ode, "God Guide Australia", was placed second to a version by Florence Maude Ewart. The Melbourne Punch reviewer, however, considered Peterson's superior in its "perennial flow of captivating and original melody".

Peterson's husband died in 1914. She lived in South Yarra during World War I and her son Franklin George Peterson (born in Edinburgh in 1891) served in Rabaul, Papua New Guinea in 1918. She sailed for London in 1920 per the White Star liner, Ceramic. After that, little is recorded of Peterson's life.

She was living at Swanage in Dorset, England in 1943 when visited by Hubert Clifford of the BBC in 1943. He programmed some of her songs to celebrate Australia Day in England.

In 1946 the Australian Broadcasting Commission produced a series of radio playlets written by G. K. Saunders which including bush songs by Peterson performed by child actress, eight-year-old Andrina Watton.

She died at Swanage on 19 April 1947.

== Works ==
=== Collections ===
- Rentoul, Annie R. (1907), Australian Songs for Young and Old, Peterson, Georgette (composer); Outhwaite, Ida Rentoul (illustrator), George Robertson. Republished by George Robertson (1908), (1910), (1924)
- Rentoul, Annie R. (1910), Bush Songs of Australia for Young and Old, Peterson, Georgette (composer), George Robertson. Republished by Allan and Co. (1924), George Robertson (1924)
- Rentoul, Annie R. (1913), More Australian Songs for Young and Old, Peterson, Georgette (composer), George Robertson. Republished by Allan and Co. (1924)
- Rentoul, Annie R. (1936), Australian Bus Songs, Peterson, Georgette (composer), Allan and Co.

=== Songs ===
- Rentoul, Annie R. (1907), God Guide Australia, Peterson, Georgette (composer); Outhwaite, Ida Rentoul (illustrator)
- Rentoul, Annie R. (1910), Australia's Song of Empire, Peterson, Georgette (composer), George Robertson
