= Mary Temple =

Mary Temple may refer to:

- Mary Boyce Temple (1856–1929), American philanthropist and socialite
- Mary Temple, pen name of Daisy Rossi (1879–1974), Australian artist, interior designer, and writer
- Mary Temple Grandin (born 1947), American academic and animal behaviorist
- Mary Temple (politician) (1903–1995), Canadian councillor
