= Australian Exhibition of Women's Work =

Australian exhibition in Melbourne in 1907

Coordinates: 37°48′17″S 144°58′17″E

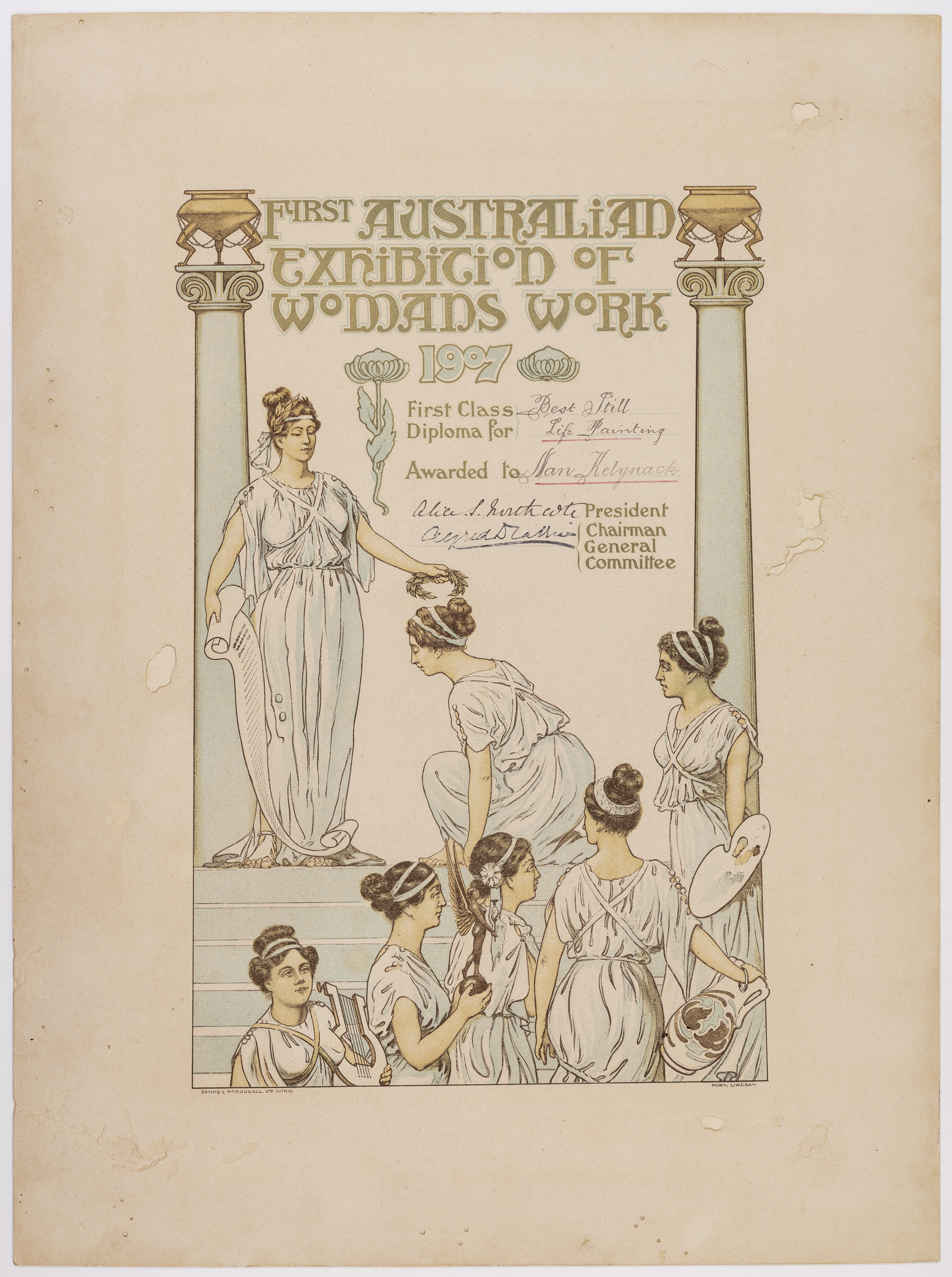
- Certificate First Class, awarded at Australian Exhibition of Women’s Work, 1907, designed by Ruby Lindsay
- Date: 23 October – 30 November 1907
- Venue: Royal Exhibition Building
- Location: Melbourne
- Patron: Queen Alexandra
- Organized by: Alice, Lady Northcote

The first Australian Exhibition of Women's Work was a national exhibition held over thirty-nine days in 1907 in Melbourne, and in the seventh year of the country's Federation. The exhibition was a celebration of the creativity and productivity of women in the manual and fine arts. It was visited by over 250,000 people who saw 16,000 exhibits by women from around Australia in competition for prizes, and 3,000 (non-competitive) entries from the rest of the world. It was one of the largest women's exhibitions ever mounted. The exhibition opened on 23 October and closed on 30 November at the Royal Exhibition Building.

== Background ==
=== Arts and crafts ===
Following from the Great Exhibition of the Works of Industry of All Nations held in London in 1851, the growing Arts and Crafts Movement, perceiving in the exhibits a degradation of the decorative arts, and in a reaction to industrialisation and urbanisation, revived traditional design and cottage craft techniques and hand-making, resulting in an unprecedented uptake of woodcarving and pottery by women artisans.

=== Exhibitions of women's industries ===
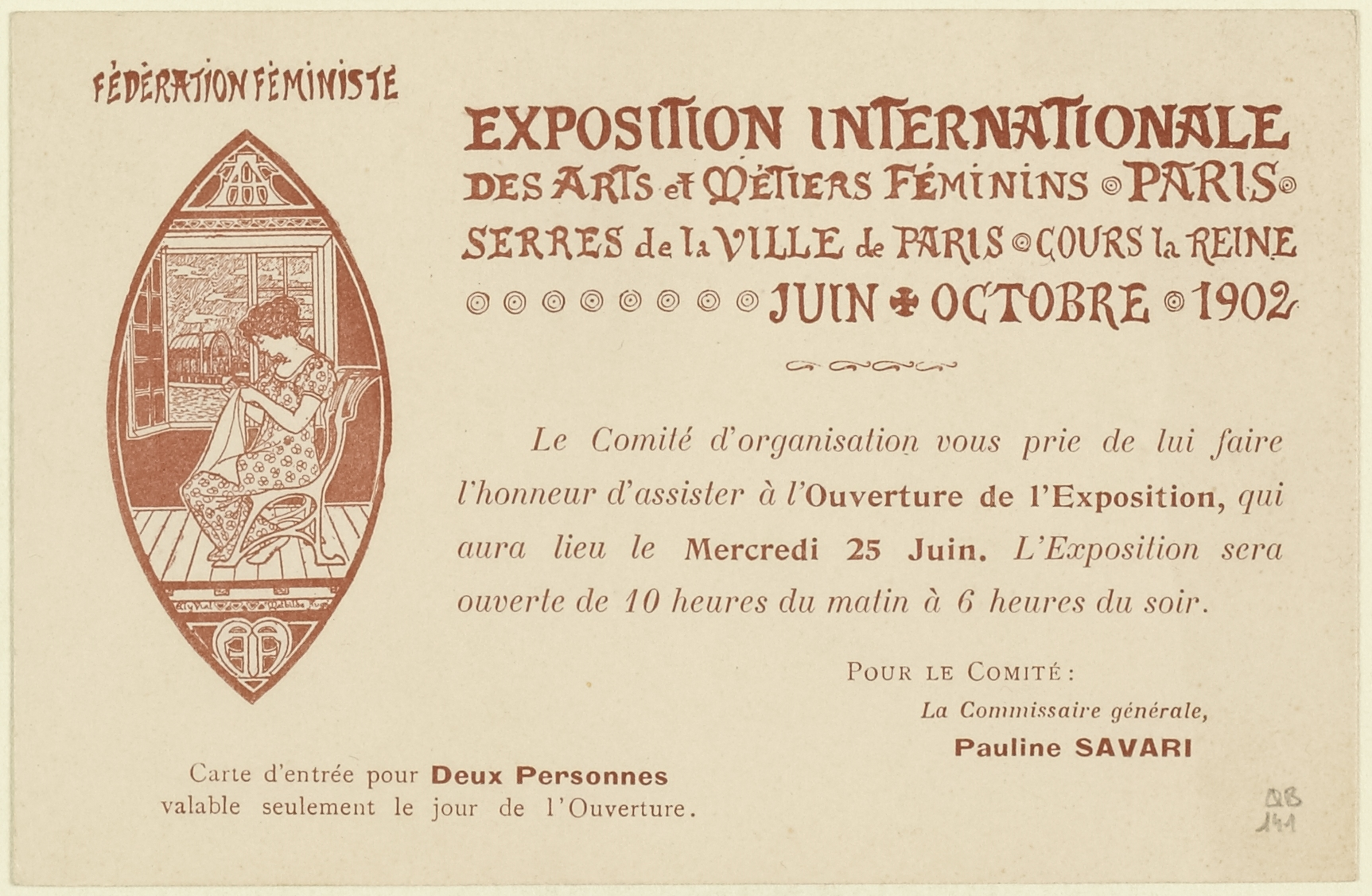
Entry card for two people to the International Exhibition of Female Arts and Crafts, Paris 1902

People in the latter part of the nineteenth century, due to industrial and societal changes in the status of women, became increasingly interested in, and appreciative of, products of female domestic and paid labour. Exhibitions of such production were held in England and other nations; the Brighton Exhibitions of Women's Arts and Industries 1887 and 1889; displays in The Woman's Building built in June 1892 for the World's Columbian Exposition held in Chicago in 1893; Copenhagen's Kvindernes Udstilling fra Fortid og Nutid (Women's Exhibition from the Past and Present) 1895; the Independent Woman Voters’ Fair, also in 1895, in Boston; and The Hague's Nationale Tentoonstelling van Vrouwenarbeid (National Exhibition of Women's Labour) of 1898.

In the United Kingdom that attention manifested in the Loan Exhibition of Women's Industries held in Queens Villa, Queen's Road, Bristol which opened on 26 February 1885. That event was reported with interest in Australian newspapers. It was followed in 1900 The Woman's Exhibition, in London.

With more radically feminist aims, the exposition internationale des arts et métiers féminins and its associated conference the Congrès du travail, organised by Pauline Savari, had taken place in Paris over four months from 25 June to 30 October 1902. It is likely the exhibition referred to by John Grice, chairman of the secretariat for the Australian Exhibition of Women's Work, in a March 1907 letter to The Age editor seeking sponsors of prizes, where he cites the 'specially contributed' awards at 'the "Gaulois" Exhibition of a similar character held in Paris a few months ago.'.

=== New South Wales ===
Preceding the Australian Exhibition of Women's Work was New South Wales' state Exhibition of Women's Industries in the 1870 Intercolonial Exhibition Building at Prince Albert Park, Redfern which opened to a crowd of 3,000 on 2 October 1888 as the closing event of Australia's centenary celebrations. Each day it attracted around 3,000 visitors who attended lectures, demonstrations, concerts and plays and its award ceremonies, was supported by patrons including the Chief Justice Frederick Darley, Governor Charles Wynn-Carington, and Premier Sir Henry Parkes. Lady Carrington was president of the organising committees and the prize-winners' medals in gold, silver and bronze were embossed with her profile. Carrington was joined by principle organiser, the philanthropist Lady Mary Elizabeth (Bolton) Windeyer who was also Foundation President of the Womanhood Suffrage League of New South Wales. Competitions in needlework, lacemaking, knitting, cooking and confectionary, typewriting, box and toy making, sick nursing and ambulance work, horticulture and fine arts including photography and pottery, were open to female schoolchildren, girls and women of all backgrounds. Proceeds of £6,000 went to the Temporary Aid Society, which supported impecunious women.

== Organisation ==
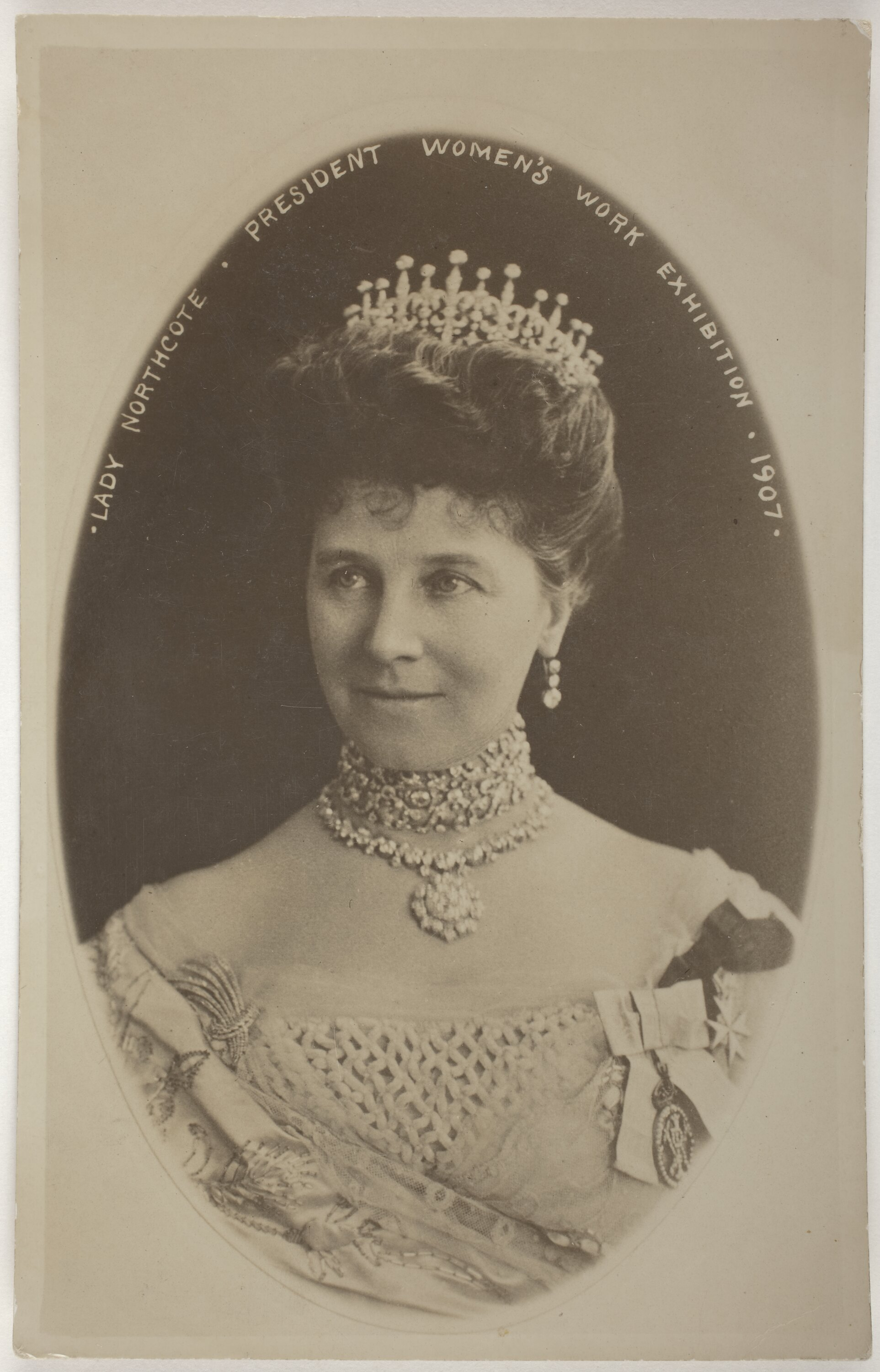
Lady Northcote, President of the Women's Work Exhibition, 1907

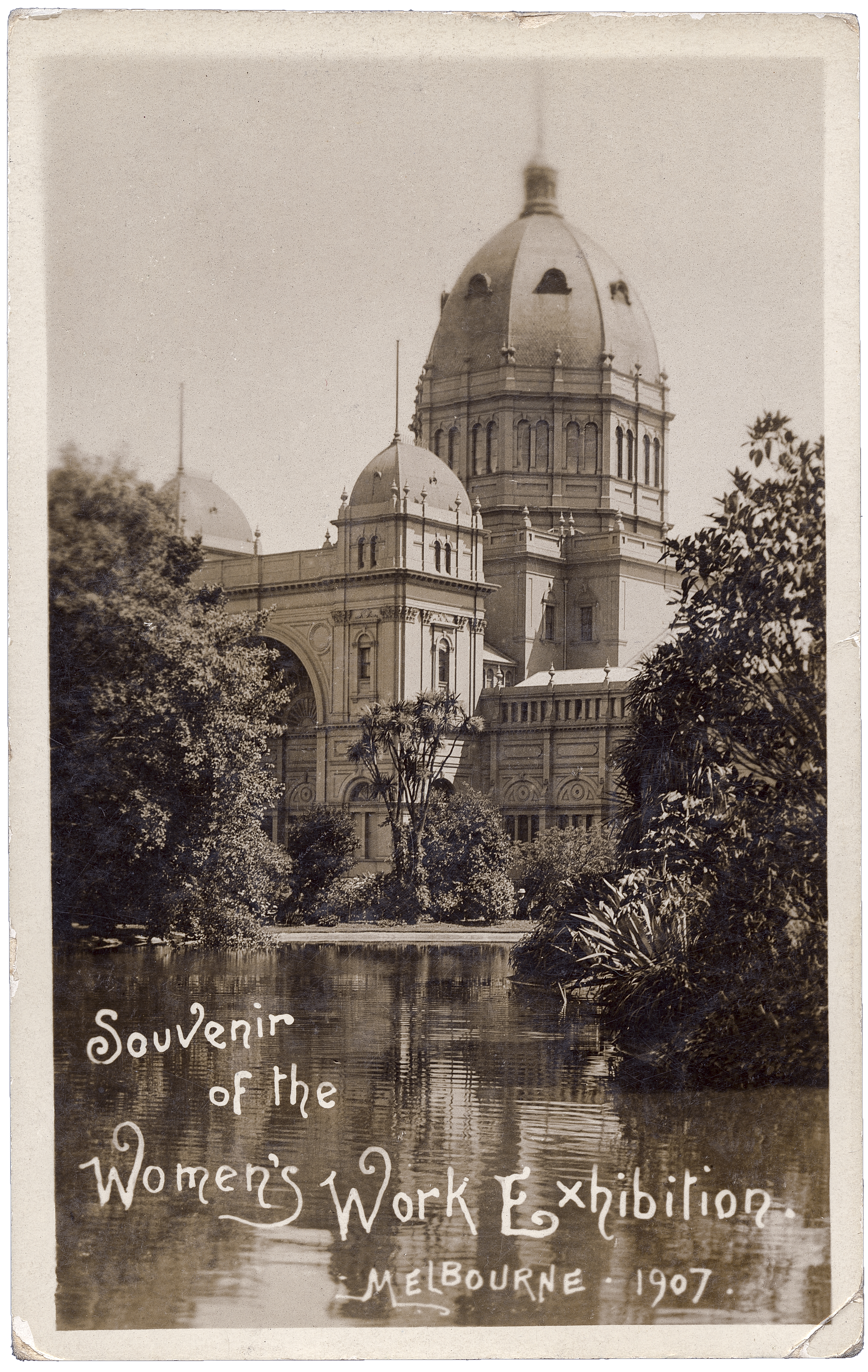
Postcard souvenir of Australian Exhibition of Women's Work showing the Royal Exhibition Building

The Australian Exhibition of Women's Work was ostensibly administered under an all-male honorary secretariat, which included chairman John Grice, manager Theo W. Heide, and C. Morrice Williams as secretary. However, the inspiration and driving force for Victoria's truly international exhibition, subsequent to Sydney's 1888 state-based exposition, was Alice, Lady Northcote, wife of the UK Conservative politician, who invited Alexandra, Queen of the United Kingdom, to be the patron. She was assisted by Margaret Jane (née Stuart-Wortley), Lady Talbot, wife of Governor of Victoria Sir Reginald Arthur James Talbot. Reporting of its preparation in the press shows that in reality, its realisation, in less than a year, was achieved to the greatest extent through the efforts of committees of women across Australia:

An influential general committee of Victorian ladies has been called together by Lady Talbot for the purpose of furthering and of organising throughout Victoria the scheme of Lady Northcote for holding an Australian Exhibition of Women's Work in 1907. At a meeting held on Wednesday, 21st November, over which Lady Talbot presided, the members were divided into sub-committees for dealing, with the various classes of competitive exhibits, as follows:— Art (including line arts, applied arts and photography), needlework (plain and art) and fancy, work, horticulture, cookery, competitions between schools and colleges, and also shorthand and type writing; physical culture, dancing, games, and sports; music, literature and elocution.

Kerr reports that a preliminary, promotional 'Australian Exhibition of Women's Work' was opened by Louise, the Duchess of Argyll at Rumplemayer's, St James' St., London on 10 July 1907, which included works by Princess Victoria, and by Margaret Preston and other Australian expatriates, 'the painters Agnes Goodsir, Iso and Alison Rae, Dora Meeson and Mary Stoddard, and sculptors Theo Cowan and Dora Ohlfsen.'

In preparation for the Melbourne event, entries were received from around the British Empire; Canada, Madras and Bloemfontein, South Africa, and the United Kingdom from whence in early August 1907 the R.M.S. Moldavia delivered first shipment of exhibits including two works by Lady Butler valued at £1200, others by Lady Feodora Gleichen, and works from the collections of Lady Henry Somerset and other 'distinguished ladies'.

== Content of the exhibition ==
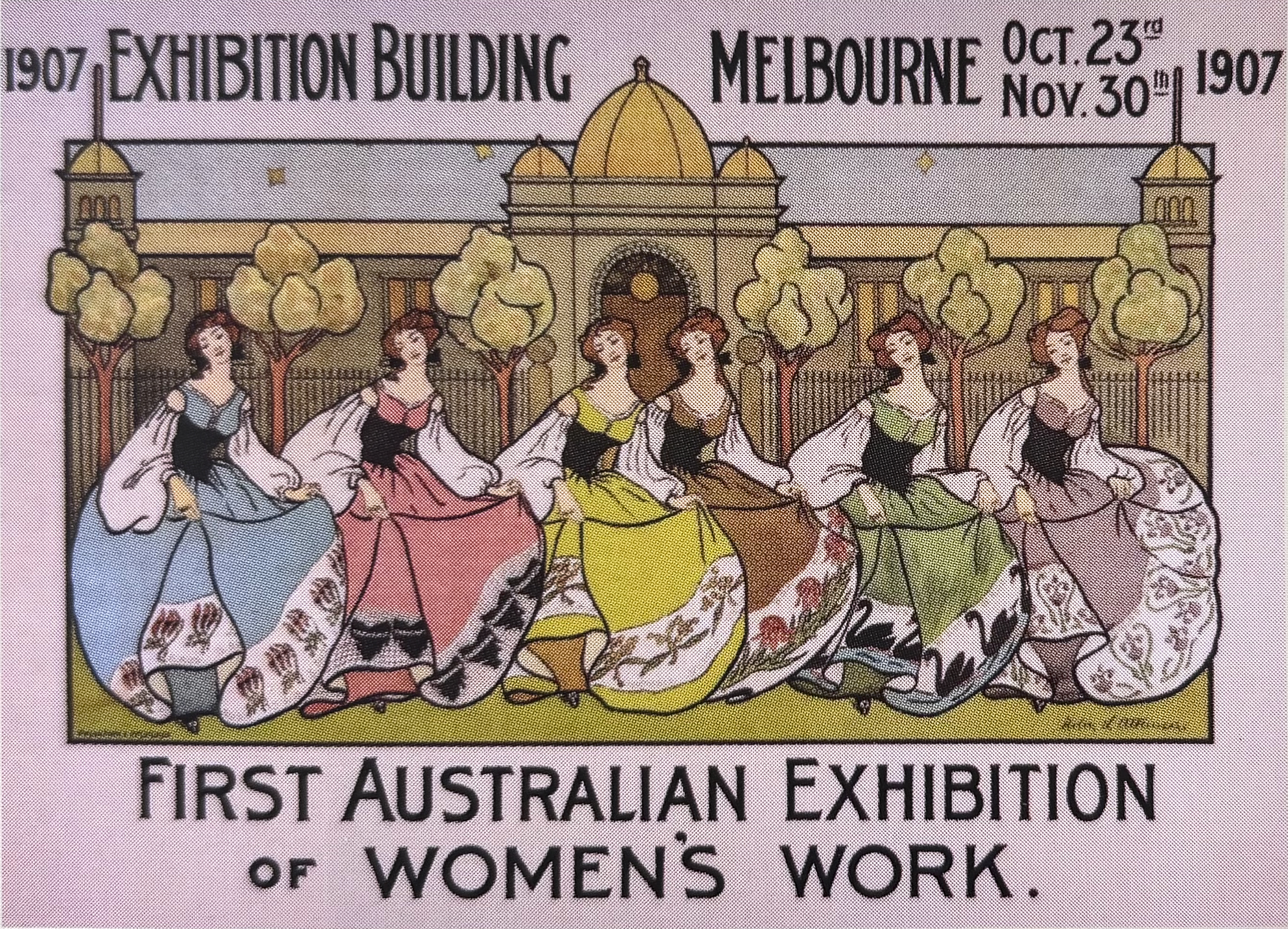
Helen L. Atkinson (1907) Poster for the First Australian Exhibition of Women's Work Colour lithograph, 42.5 x 61.0 Buda Collection

The exhibition featured the decorative and fine arts and those associated with women, both amateur and professional and those receiving education and training in several disciplines. The exhibition was seen as the harvest of their novel applied works. While working-class women were entering employment in larger numbers, paid labour was however still discouraged amongst their middle class sisters whose products, also on show, were made for home or church, but the exhibition and most of its competitions were open to women of every social strata, with the option to exhibit without competing for a prize.

Women had always created art but the exhibition hoped to show how these skills could be turned into a business as designers or trained draughtswomen. Needlework art had over 1,000 entries, and Lady Talbot in December 1906 proposed, and in January 1907 offered, 'a special prize for seamstresses to be competed for only by women who earn their livelihood by their needle and whose weekly earnings do not exceed 25/-,' adding that the materials used be 'inexpensive'. A horticultural section, in which, as for other categories, prizes were offered in numbers of classes, specified in that case that plants 'must have been grown by the competitor, or else have been in her possession and under her care for at least six months preceding the date of the opening of the exhibition.'.

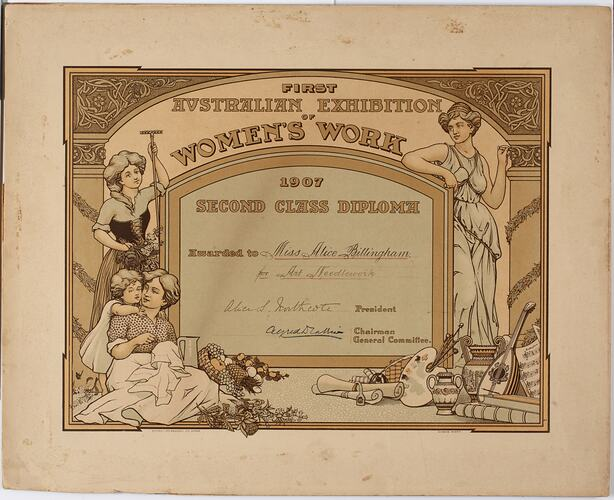
Australian Exhibition of Women's Work certificate (1907) by Eirene Mort

Bendigo artist Helen Atkinson, who also won 'Best Design for a Book Plate for Process Reproduction', produced the poster chosen to promote the exhibition. It is a stylised Art Nouveau-inspired representation of each of the six states as craftswomen disporting costumes adorned with symbols of their state and dancing in unison outside Melbourne's Royal Exhibition Building; Hannon and McKay note that the Executive Committee Minutes of 28 September 1906 resolved that in the interest of equal representation 'the Exhibition ... be removed from the Arena of any state feeling.'

=== Australian motifs ===
Eirene Mort who had already completed work for Liberty's was one of the exhibitions supporters and had hundreds of entries herself in a variety of classes. Her designs were noted for her use of Australian flora and fauna as subject matter. Mort wrote a passionately argued article in Art and architecture: the journal of the Institute of Architects of New South Wales on the desirability of deploying distinctively Australian motifs in design and architecture and manufacture. Ruby Lindsay and Mort created the designs for the first and second diplomas respectively and both represented the roles of women in the domestic and creative spheres with idealised classical figures of young women personifying the new nation.

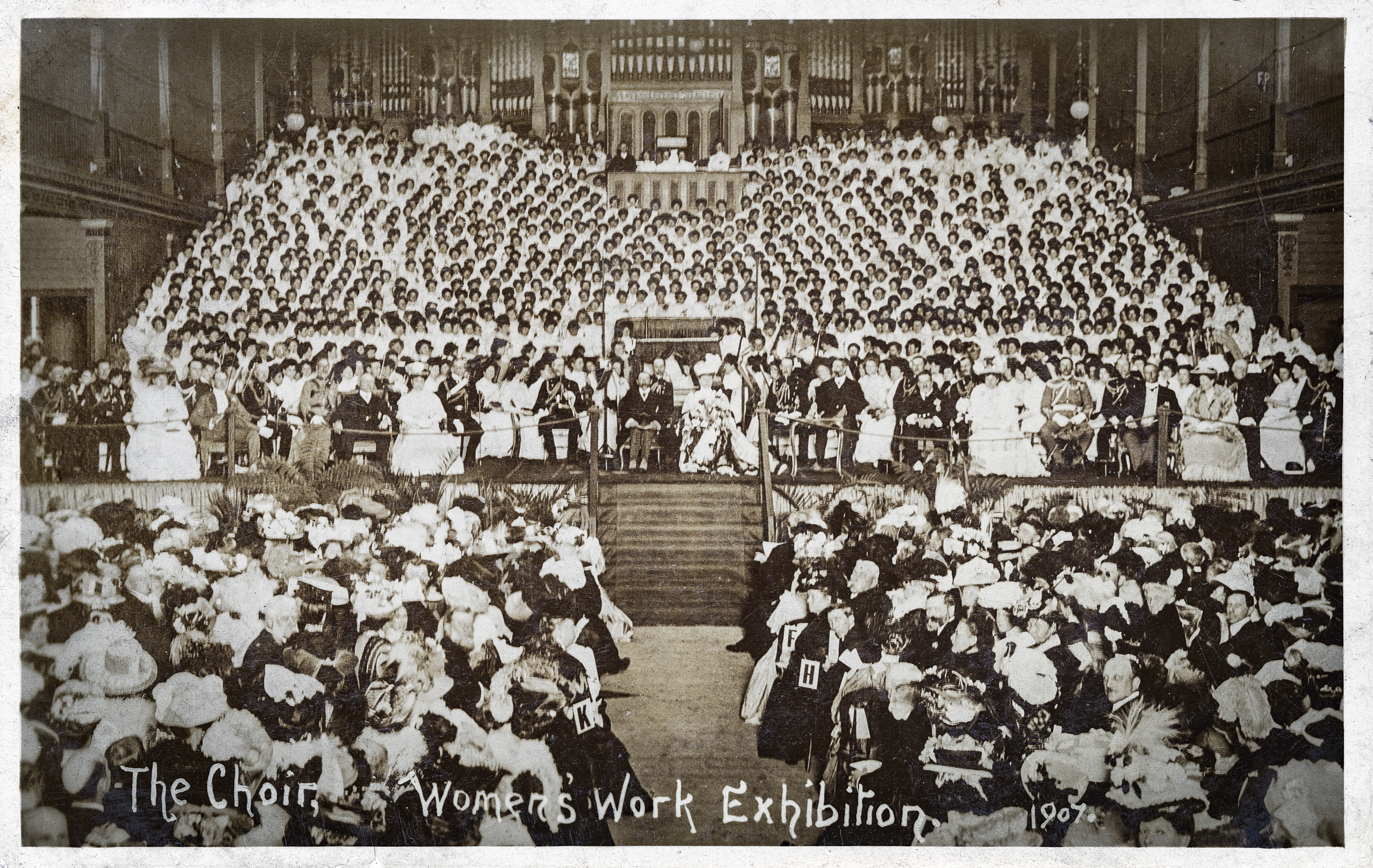
The Choir, Women's Work Exhibition 1907, souvenir postcard

=== Performance ===
Music was one of the arts: Georgette Peterson's music featured in a book by Ida Sherbourne Outhwaite and her sister and Peterson conducted a choir of 1,300 women. Florence Maud Ewart served as co-conductor for the exhibition, and she won first prize for her composition "God Guide Australia".

Deakin organised a creche, and there were demonstrations of kindergarten teaching by Emmeline Pye from Melbourne Teachers' College.

Prizes and medals were given for exhibits and for essays. The medals were bronze, and they included the motto "The Cross of Christ is My Light".

== Context ==
The Australian Exhibition of Women's Work has been credited with being the 'largest', 'most comprehensive' and "the most complete expression of the state of decorative arts at the start of the century", though advisedly in the Australian context; 1907 was the year in which Pablo Picasso painted his Les Demoiselles d'Avignon and Kolomon Moser with Josef Hoffmann had, four years previous, founded the Wiener Werkstätte"Wiener Werkstätte". Encyclopædia Britannica. which, preceding the Bauhaus, produced functionally designed household goods in severely geometric minimalist decoration.

== Notable contributors ==
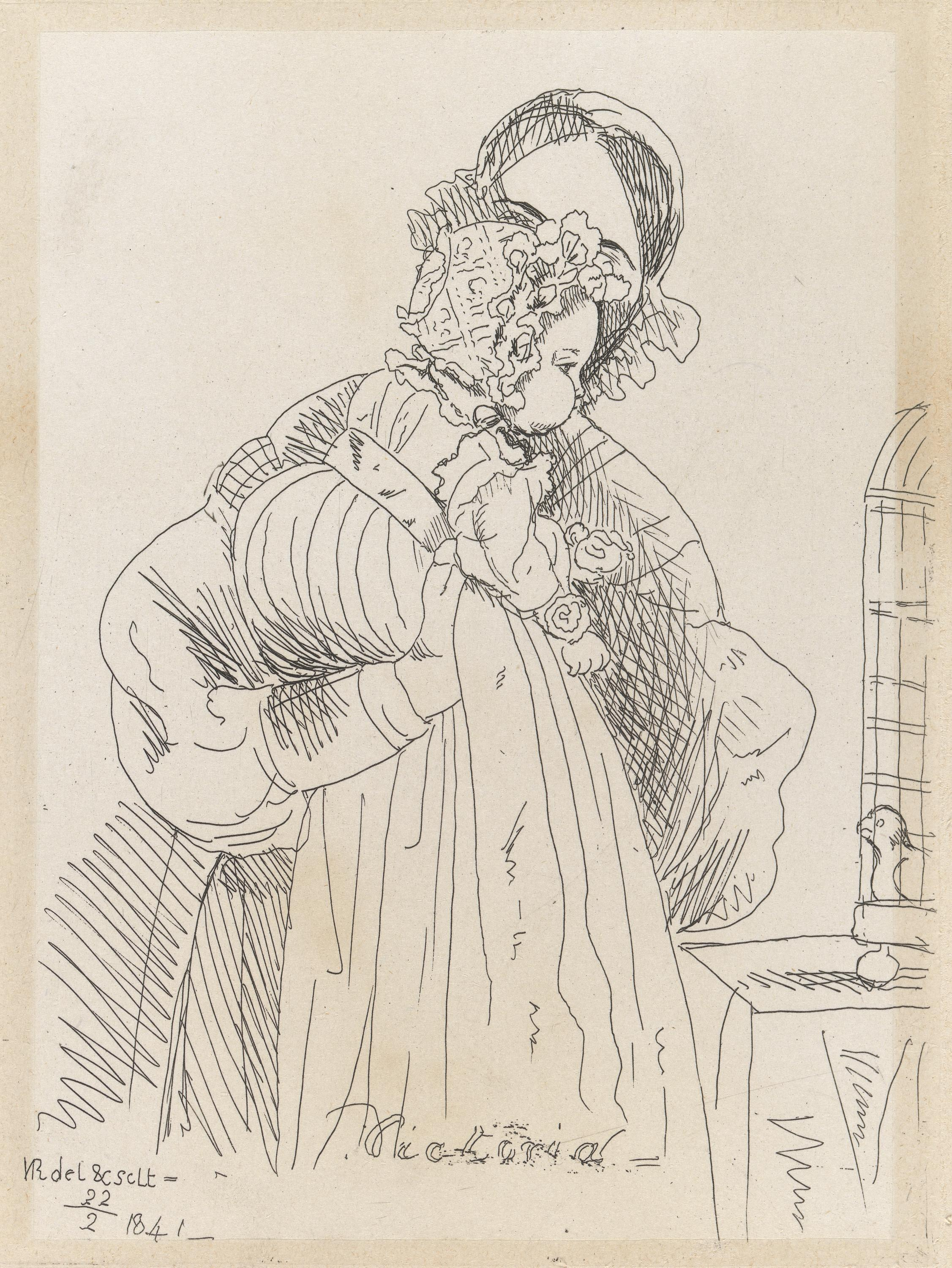
Queen Victoria (1840) Princess Adelheid of Hohenlohe-Langenburg with her nurse, etching exhibited in 'Royal Exhibits' section

- Maud Baillie (née Golley) of Wedge Island; a skilful self-taught furniture maker and wood carver who reportedly 'was "discovered" in 1904, by the Governor of South Australia. A large cabinet carved by her shows great executive ability and sympathy in the reproduction of natural forms in high relief.'
- Asquith Baker showed Landscape, evening, and The mandolin player
- A.M.E. Bale won three second-class diplomas: in Best Genre Painting for Suppertime; Second-Class for Flowers that bloom in the Spring; Best Figure Study in Black & White
- Elsie Barlow, who won 'Best Seascape' (watercolour), in 1913 was one of the founders of the Castlemaine Art Gallery and Historical Museum
- Margaret Baskerville, sculptor of a statue of Sir Thomas Bent, a former Premier of Victoria, won First Prize for Best Model of a Figure or Group of Figures in Marble or Bronze, and 2nd in Medal Design
- Muriel Binney's entry was a vast, almost twenty-metre-wide, watercolour view, Sydney Harbour Foreshores at Sunset which was an entry for the "Best original design for a frieze," when maritime painting was dominated by men.'
- Emma Minnie Boyd’s painting To the workhouse was sent by the National Gallery of Victoria
- Edith Cusack's Wildflowers and At the florist's was sent by the Art Gallery of New South Wales
- Bernice Edwell, who served on the Fine Arts sub-committee, won First Prize for Best Miniature (work now unknown)
- Florence Fuller contributed her landscape painting A golden Hour (NGA)
- Susanne Vilhelmine Gether and The Society of Arts and Crafts of NSW organised 60 people to carve a rosewood dining set.
- Gertrude Healy won the first place for solo violin at the exhibition.
- Flora Annie Landells (1888-1981), painter and potter
- Bertha Merfield contributed eleven paintings
- Mary Meyer, won Best Seascape with her painting A Sorrento lime boat (c. 1907)
- Alice Mills, photographer
- Eirene Mort, designer
- Ellen Nora Payne, Tasmanian wood carver
- Georgette Peterson, Hungarian-born composer and conductor
- Emmeline Pye, kindergarten expert
- Lilla Reidy entered eleven paintings
- Florence Rodway, won first prize for her charcoal drawing Portrait of a woman (NGA)
- Daisy Rossi, painter and interior designer
- Ellis Rowan had two flower paintings contributed by the National Gallery of Victoria
- Clara Southern showed paintings in the non-competitive section including An Old Bee Farm
- Jane Sutherland showed paintings in the non-competitive Fine Art section
- May Vale exhibited 10 works, of painting, including Spring at Mayfield, enamelling and jewellery
- Queen Victoria, (posthumously) exhibited etchings in the popular 'Royal Exhibits' section which included works by Exhibition Patron Queen Alexandra
- Dora Wilson, painter. First Prize for 'Best Sample of Etching' (work now unknown)

== Impact ==
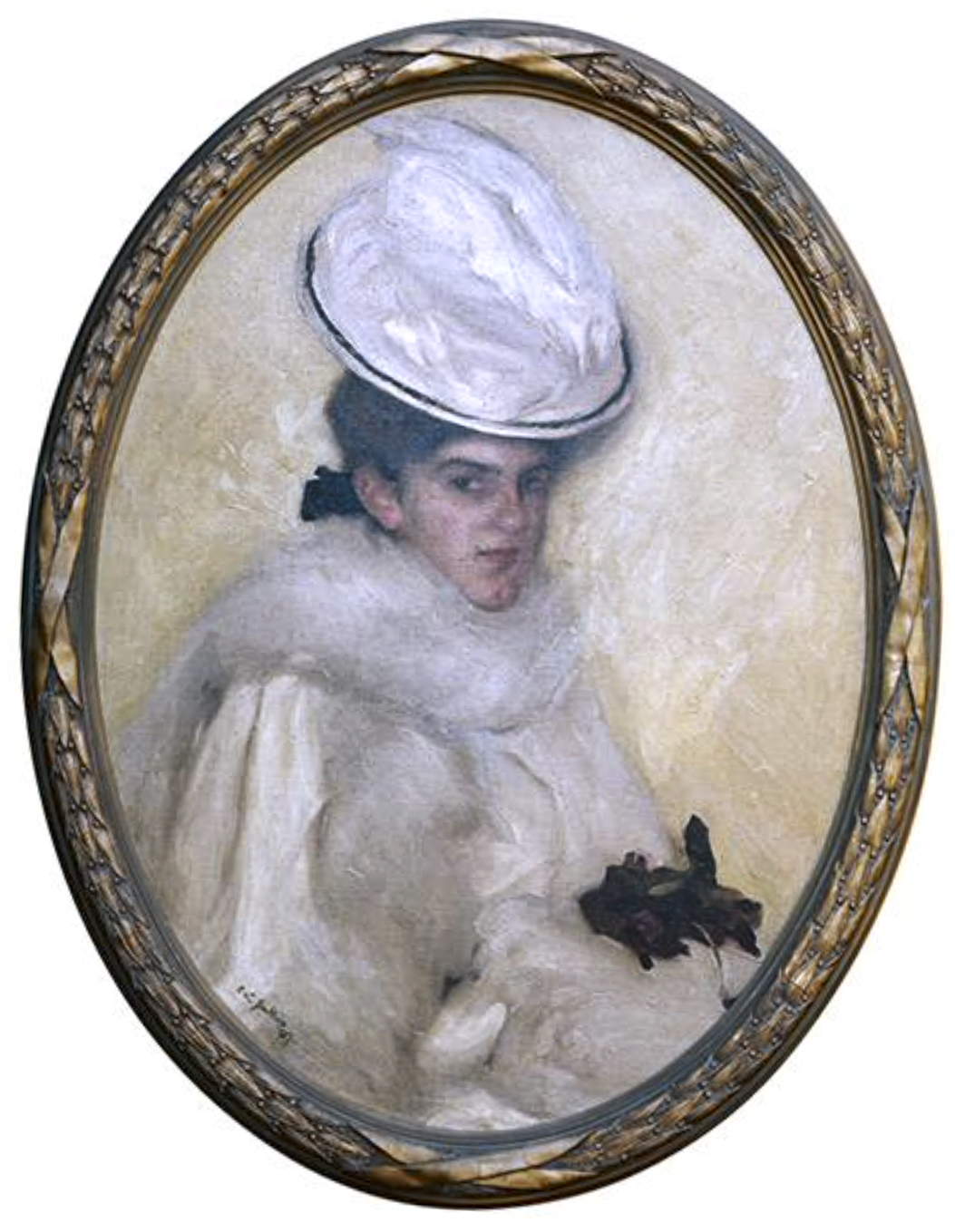
Constance L. Jenkins (1907) The girl in white (Portrait of Miss Boyne) oil on canvas

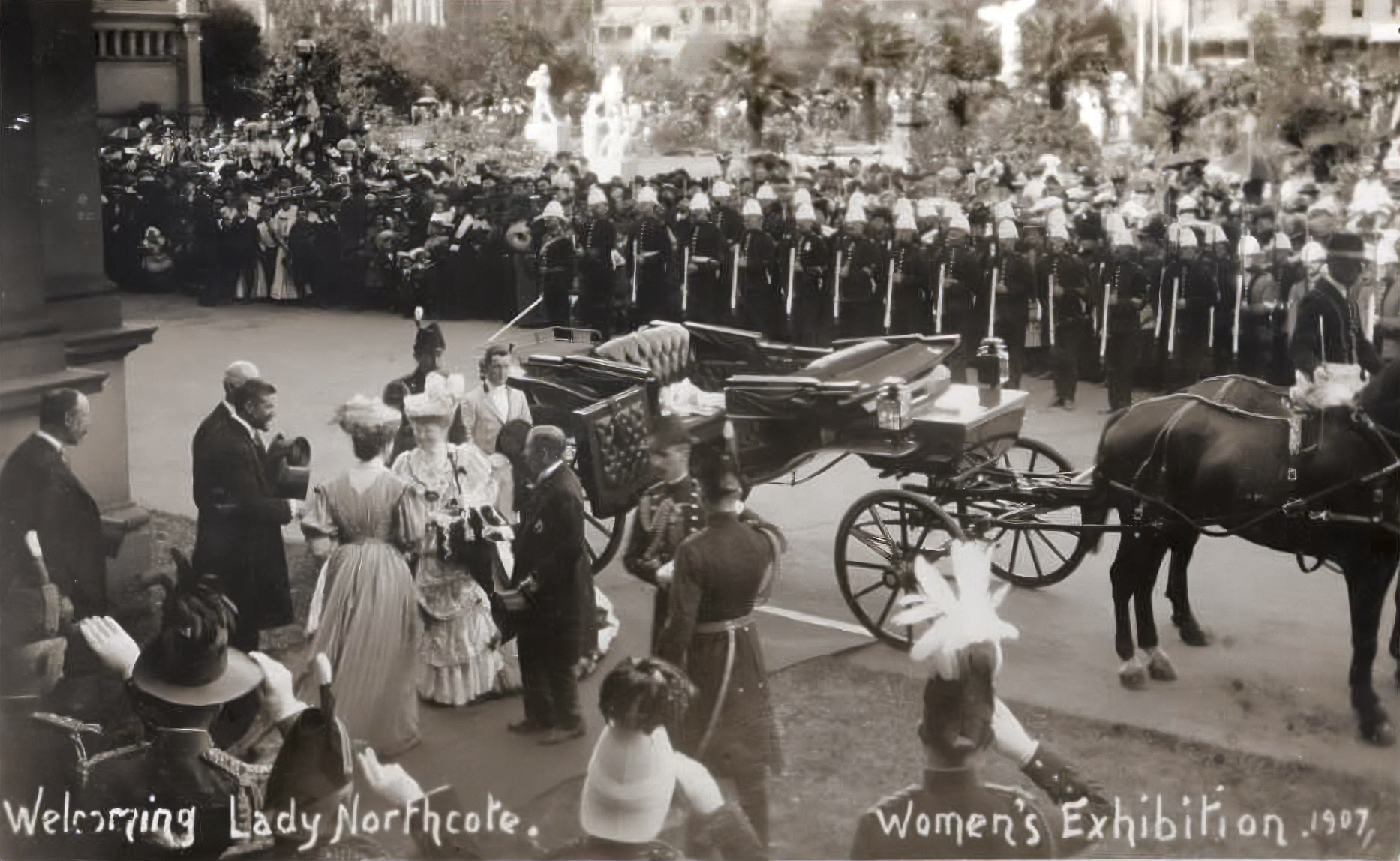
Lady Northcote welcomed by officials at the First Australian Exhibition of Women's Work

The exhibition's impact was very high. It was considered a catalyst for further change, as contributors saw what others had made, when they came to see their own work.

For many it was the first recognition of their creativity; it was Constance Jenkins' debut when, still a student at the National Gallery School, her 1907 oil on canvas Portrait of Miss Borne (The Girl in White) won First Prize and Exhibition Gold Medal and Special Prize for Best Work of Art in Fine Arts Section; Foy and Gibson’s Special Prize of £12 12s; Sir Reginald Talbot’s Special Prize of €10 10s for Best Work of Art in the Fine Arts Section; Silver Medal and Special Prize for Best Oil Painting; Admiral Sir Fredrick Bedford’s Special Prize of €5 for the Best Oil Painting: Mrs Alex Landale Special Prize of €5 5s for the picture proved by vote of the public to be the favourite, placing her ahead of Violet Teague, and she shared first place for figure painting with Royal Academician Florence Rodway.

The national parliament, and all the state parliaments, had a day off in honour of the exhibition's opening and fifteen thousand people attended the opening ceremony conducted by Alice, Lady Northcote and Pattie Deakin, the wives respectively of Australia's Governor General and its Prime Minister. Over the five and a half weeks there were 250,000 visitors, equal to half of Melbourne's then population of 500,000, and when Victoria's was 1.2 million, and Australia's, 4.1 million.

The exhibition was intended to celebrate women's work and to educate, and it directly inspired the formation of the Arts and Crafts Society of Victoria in 1908, which in turn worked to expand technical training for women. By contrast, in 1907 the women of Melbourne had yet to be allowed to vote in state elections.

== Legacy ==
Hannon and McKay note that despite contemporaneous media attention on the Exhibition and preparations for it, the executive committee left unpublished its history and the documentation was subsequently lost. Kerr, writing in 1999, laments that 'of the thousands of exhibits, only a dozen or so are now known' and that scant reference to it appeared in the forty years after the mid 1930s; a short article describing it as a 'successful feminist event' appeared in the Centenary Gift Book of 1934; and in The Story of Australian Art, also published in 1934, critic William Moore, gives mention to it in discussing specific women artists. Three decades earlier in The New Idea he had written encouraging financial independence for women artists and referred to the Exhibition of Women’s Work as providing women readers with contemporary role models, and in a 1926 plea for a national gallery in Brisbane refers again to the Exhibition.

Nevertheless, the event remained absent from publications of Australian art history until 1977, when Ann Stephen's article in the feminist arts magazine Lip revived interest, prompting Robert and Ingrid Holden in Hecate: A Women's Interdisciplinary Journal to further discuss the Exhibition in relation to other women's art and crafts exhibitions. Reference to these articles and the Exhibition's impact on the emergence of professional women artists and craftworkers appear in later histories of decorative arts in Australia.

An exhibition and catalogue; Centenary celebration: First Australian Exhibition of Women's Work 1907, discovered further exhibitors. It was put together by Kirsten McKay, Peter Perry and Geoff Hannon from its holdings of several of the exhibitors, with loans from other institutions, at Castlemaine Art Gallery and Historical Museum, Castlemaine, 21 October–9 December 2007.

== Sample of extant works from the Australian Exhibition of Women's Work ==
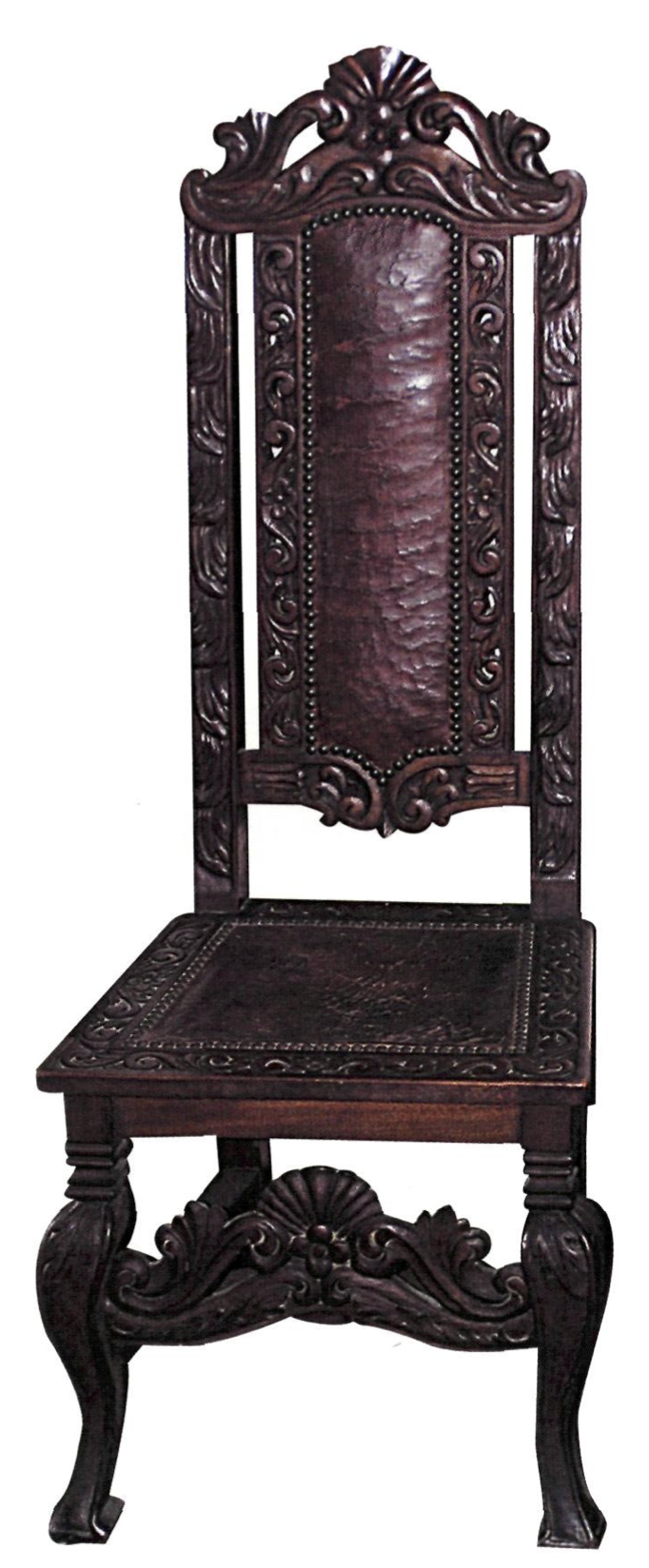
Dining chair, one of a suite carved by Susanne Gether and a group of 62 students and associates.

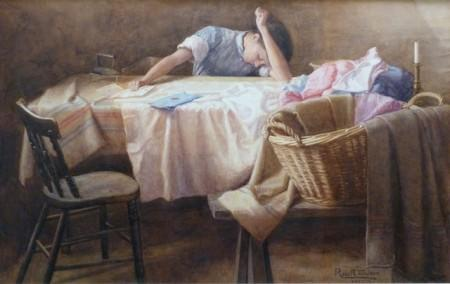
Rose A. Walker (1900) News from the Front, watercolour

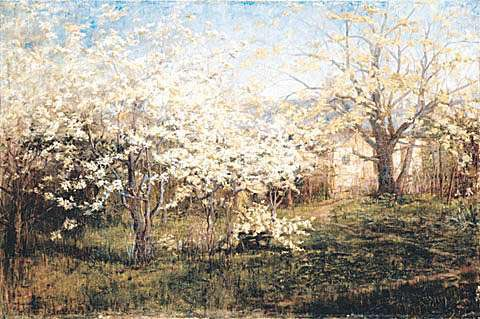
May Vale (c.1904) The orchard (Spring at Mayfield) oil on canvas

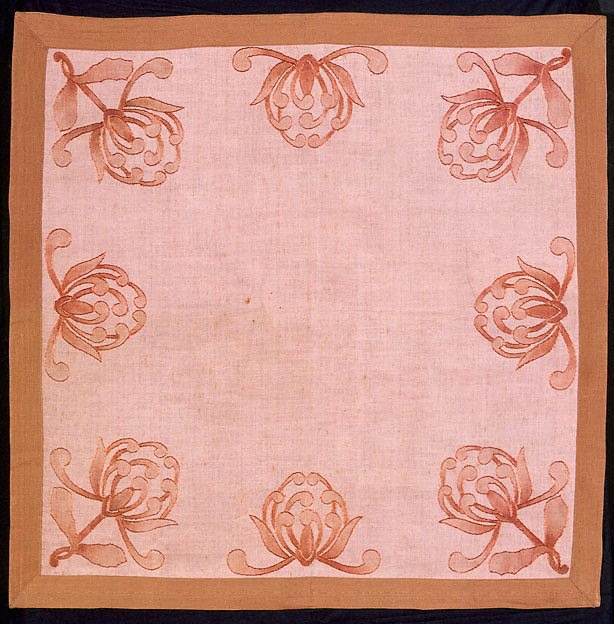
Eirene Mort (c.1907) Tablecloth with waratah design

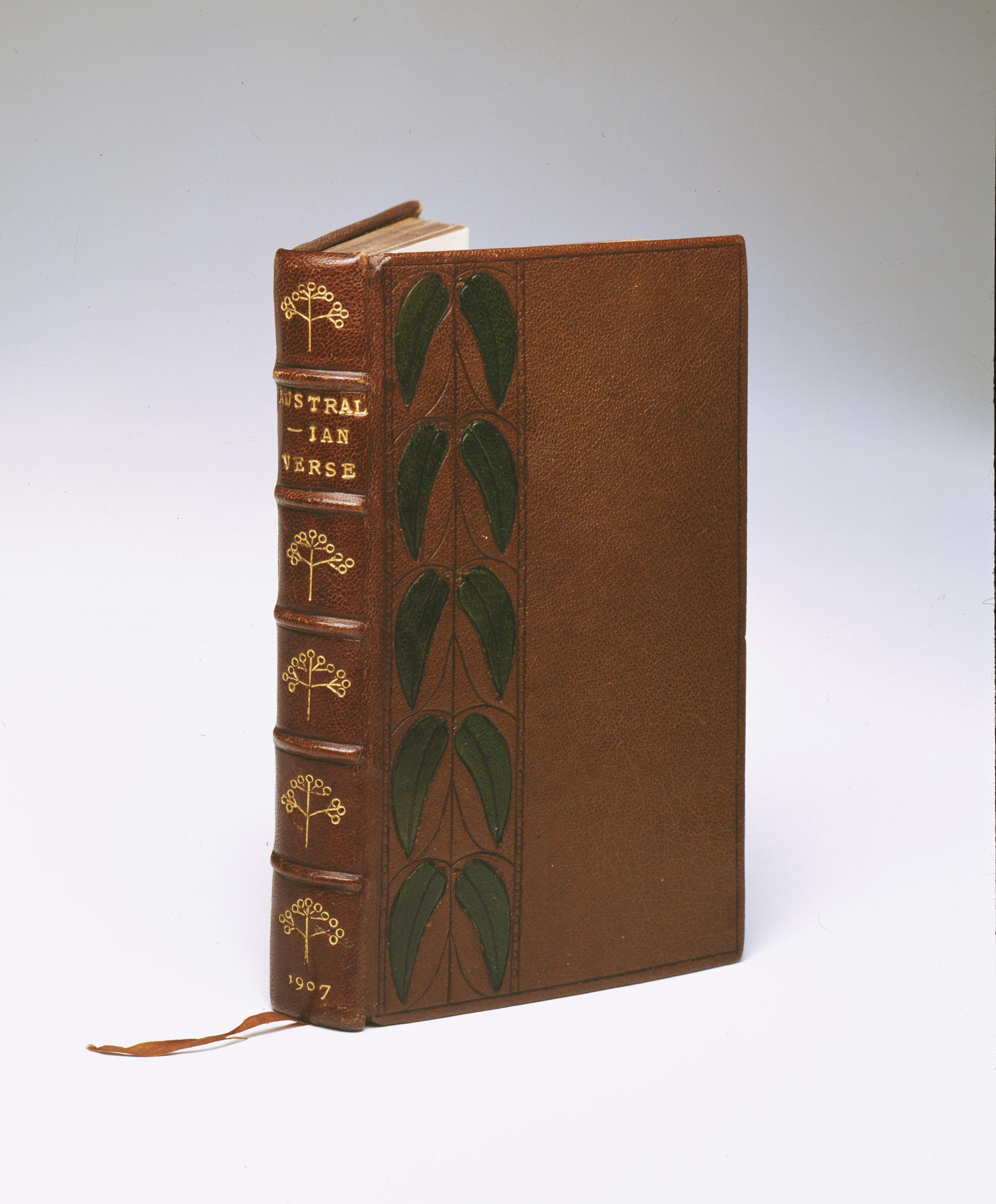
Margaret Chapman 1906 bookbinding and design; An anthology of Australian verse

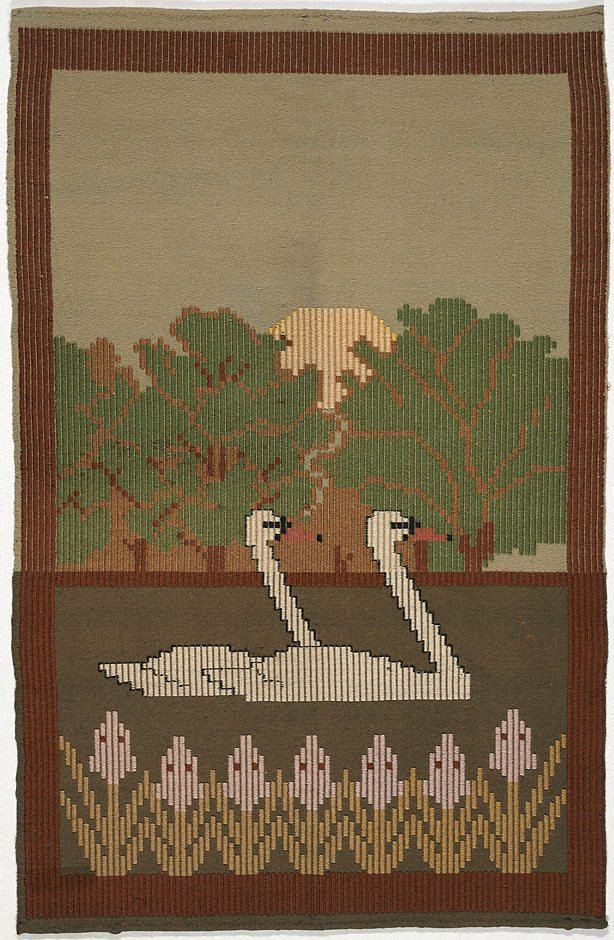
Susan Gether (c.1907) Wall panel with swan and landscape design

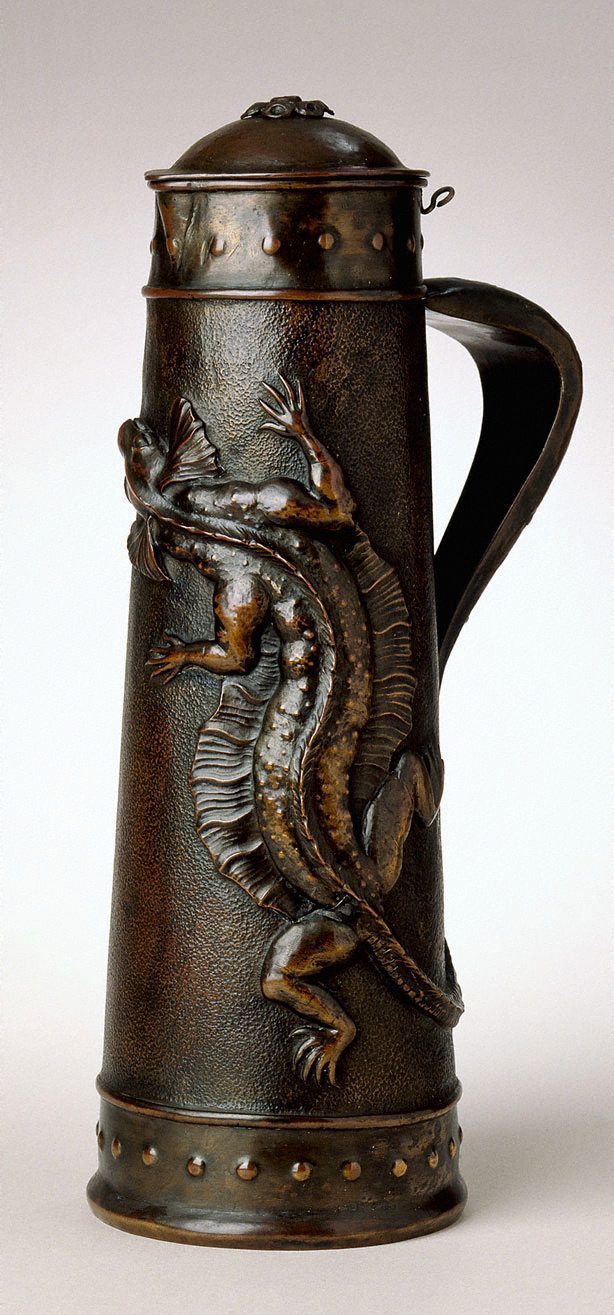
Elizabeth Söderberg (c.1906) Tankard with frilled lizard, insect and gumleaf design, pewter

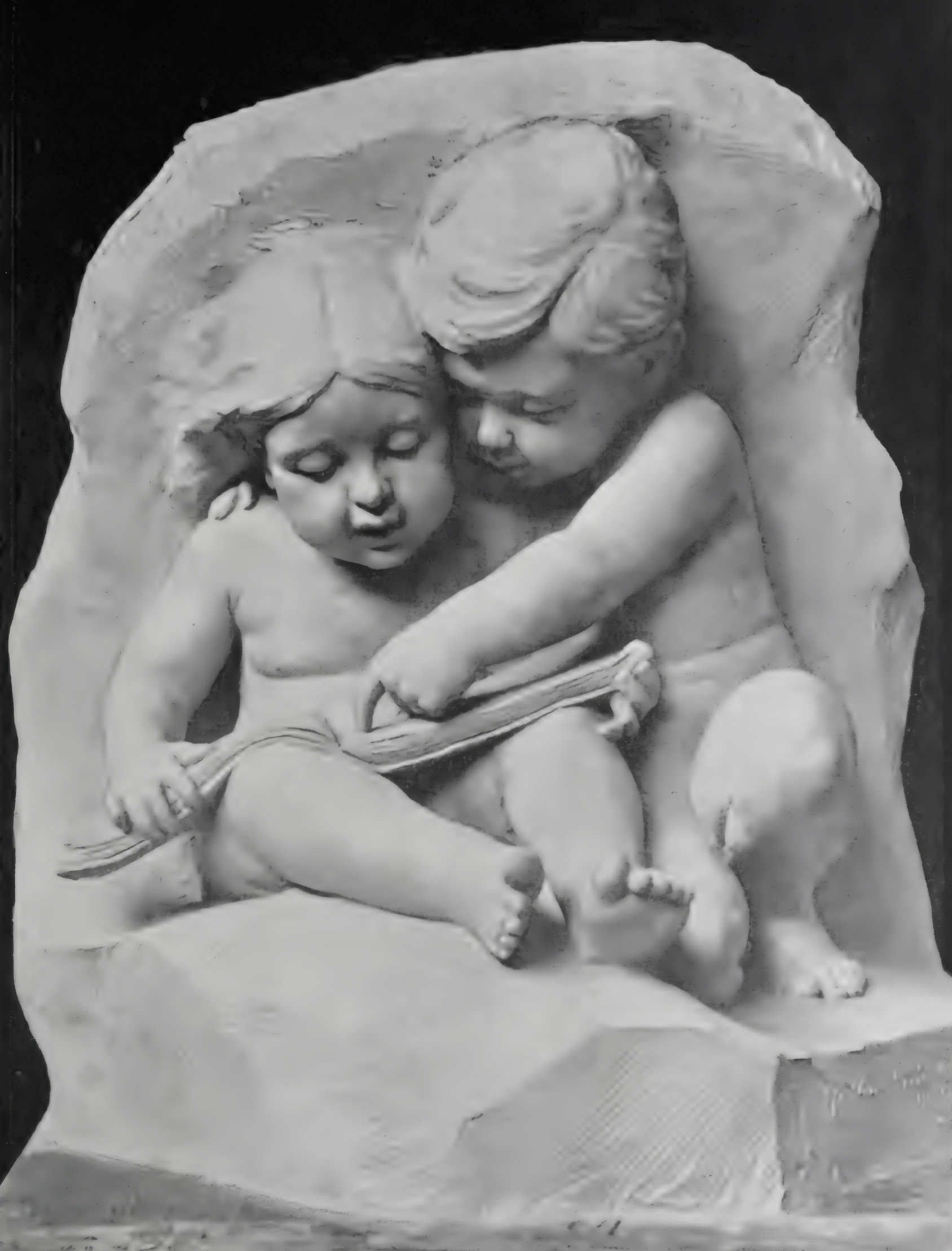
Margaret Baskerville (c.1905) Dawn of the Mind, relief sculpture

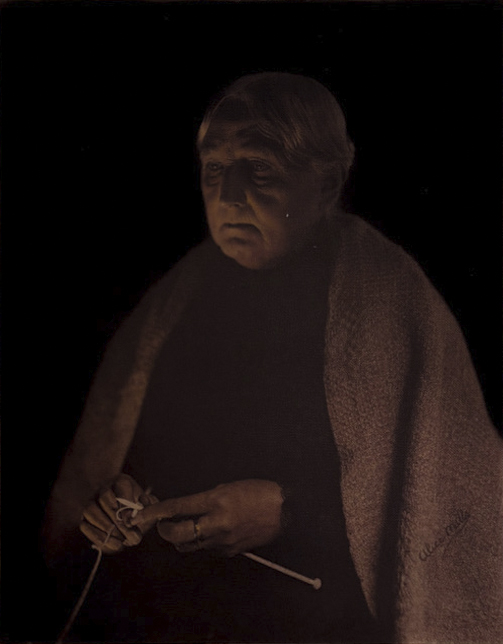
Alice Mills (c. 1905) Winter from the series Four Seasons. Silver gelatin print, watercolour
