= Reddie Mallett =

English naturopath and writer

- Born: 18 February 1864; Shoreditch
- Died: 7 September 1938 (aged 73–74); Dunsford
- Occupations: Naturopath, writer

Josiah Reddie Martin Mallett (18 February 1864 – 7 September 1938), known as Reddie Mallett, was an English freethinker, naturopath, poet and writer.

== Career ==
Mallett was born on 18 February 1864 in London. He was educated at Mill Hill Grammar School and as a young man took interest in literature and poetry. He authored books and pamphlets on natural health that were published by Watts & Co. His most popular book Nature's Way: A Means of Health Without Medicine sold well in the United Kingdom. By 1926 it was in its 18th edition and had sold 185,000 copies. It also sold well in Australia and was reprinted as How to Get Well: According to Nature's Way. A revised edition was edited by George Ryley Scott in 1948.

Mallett gave special importance to diet for attaining health without medicine. He promoted natural remedies and the consumption of fruit and vegetable juices. He opposed the use of drugs and had no faith in physicians and surgeons. His 1926 Book of Health promoted a diet of fruit juice and to cure all ailments by lemon juice and olive oil. Mallett stated that lemon juice is a marvellous disinfectant that is unrecognized by medical science and can cure many diseases including cancer. The book was criticized in 1931 as statements in the book contravened the Venereal Diseases Act 1917. The British Social Hygiene Council and the Ministry for Health were concerned about its harmful advice regarding self-treatment of syphilis. The book was withdrawn by the publisher. This was the only book Mallett authored that was withdrawn by Watts & Co. He continued to author many other books for them on naturopathy that were published in the 1930s. His dietary views influenced Portia Geach.

In 1935, Mallett stated that he could "live quite well" on a diet of fruit juices and he was walking over a hundred miles each month.

== Death ==
Mallett died at Dunsford on 7 September 1938. His estate valued at £1,933 was granted to his widow Mrs. Clara Mallett.

== Selected publications ==
- A Life's History Told in Homely Verse: And Miscellaneous Poems (1895)
- Poems (1901)
- Freedom Songs (1916)
- The Gospel of Feeding: From Childhood to Old Age (1925)
- Nature's Way: A Means of Health Without Medicine (1926, 1930)
- The Book of Health (1926)
- Constipation and Cancer (1927)
- Nature's Rebuilding Power (1927)
- Poems from Beyond (1927)
- The Cure of Cancer (1928)
- Food the Physician (1931)
- Cancer: A Word of Hope (1932)
- The Way to Health (1932)
- Too Much Doctoring (1932)
- Diet and Treatment in Sickness and Health (1933)
- Preventable Suffering (1934)
