= Gertrude Healy =

Australian violinist, music educator

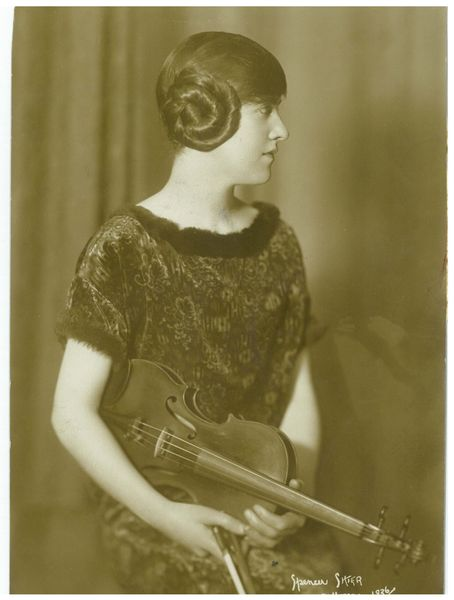

Personal life
- Born: 18 March 1894 Ballarat, Victoria, Australia
- Died: 6 October 1984 (aged 90) Ballarat, Victoria, Australia

Religious life
- Religion: Christianity
- Denomination: Roman Catholic
- Order: Sisters of Mercy
- Monastic name: Sister M. Catherine of Siena

Gertrude Healy (18 March 1894 – 6 October 1984) was an Australian violinist who taught at the Albert Street Conservatorium of Music in Melbourne, and became conductor of their chamber orchestra. She was well respected for her virtuosity as a violinist, and her willingness to introduce audiences to contemporary works by composers of her day. She later became a member of the Sisters of Mercy, a Catholic religious order, and taught at the Sacred Heart College in her hometown of Ballarat, Victoria.

== Musical career ==
Healy was born in Ballarat East, Victoria, Australia, the daughter of Michael John and Mary Helena Healy. She attended a Catholic secondary school, Sacred Heart College, in Ballarat. At an early age, Healy showed great talent as a violinist. She began performing at age ten in Royal South Street Society competitions, winning several awards. She won the first place for solo violin at the First Australian Exhibition of Women's Work in 1907 in Melbourne. As a result of her successful performances, she earned a scholarship to the Albert Street Conservatorium of Music in Melbourne. In 1914, she travelled to Europe, where she studied with German violinist Siegfried Eberhardt, in Berlin. Her sister Kathleen travelled with her. In the summer of 1914, Healy travelled to England. War was declared in July, and Healy remained in England, where she studied with Albert Sammons, and played charitable concerts for the war effort.

Healy returned to Australia in 1920, and in 1923, began teaching violin at the Albert Street Conservatorium. By 1943, she had become the music conductor of the chamber orchestra at the school. She continued performing as a violinist, appearing with the Melbourne Symphony Orchestra, the Australian Musical News Chamber Music Club and other classical music organizations.

== Religious life ==
In 1948, Healy left her post at the Albert Street Conservatorium, and joined the Sisters of Mercy religious order. She took her final vows in 1950. She lived at the Convent of Mercy in her hometown of Ballarat East, taking the name Sister Catherine of Siena. Healy taught musical education at Sacred Heart College, where she also oversaw the orchestra. She introduced new works by contemporary composers, including the English composer Benjamin Britten, and her influence was instrumental in the college earning a reputation for excellence in musical education. Healy died in 1984, and is buried in the cemetery in Ballarat.
