= Emmeline Pye =

Australian teacher and lecturer (1861–1949)

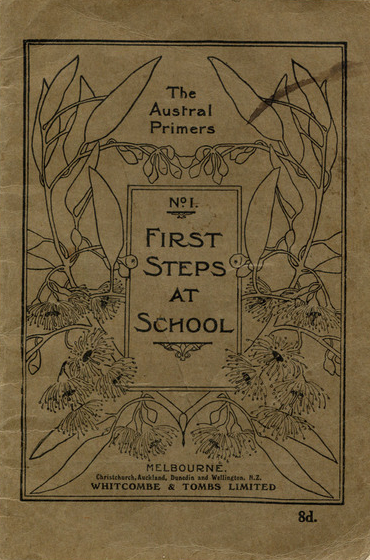
- by Emmeline Pye, First Steps at School c. 1915
- Born: December 13, 1861; Buninyong
- Died: April 20, 1949 (aged 87); Toorak
- Occupations: educationist and teacher
- Known for: introducing kindergarten ideas to Victoria

Emmeline Pye (13 December 1861 – 20 April 1949) was an Australian educationalist, teacher and lecturer. She was one of the first Australians trained in kindergarten ideas and she opened the first one, run by the state of Victoria, in 1907 in Brunswick.

== Life ==
Pye was born in Buninyong in 1861. Her English born parents were Joanna Saunders (born Edwards) and William Marsland Pye. Her brother became the wheat breeder Hugh Pye and her father, who had been married before, was the headteacher at Christ Church Grammar School in Geelong.

Eva Hooper was brought to Victoria in 1900 to train teachers in the new ideas of Kindergarten. She taught teachers about not teaching children by rote but appealing to their understanding. One of the teachers she trained was Pye who had been an infant teacher since 1882.

John Smyth became the Principal of Melbourne Teachers' College and he wanted all primary teachers to be trained at his residential college in the latest methods. Smyth chose Pye as one of his first recruits to lecture the college's students who were studying for an Infant Teachers' Certificate. In addition Pye showed them Kindergarten methods at the Central Brunswick Practising School. Pye led that school's infant department from 1904.

Pye opened a kindergarten school in 1907 in Albert Street in Brunswick. It was the first run by the state. She was said to have anticipated ideas and equipment credited to Maria Montessori. Interest was high and Pye demonstrated teaching methods at the Australian Exhibition of Women's Work in Melbourne in 1907. In 1908, she officially joined the Melbourne Teachers' College's staff. The college organised summer schools at Portsea at which Pye, Smyth and the Director of Education Frank Tate all assisted.

John Smyth had noted that her original introductions included the synergy she created by linking up the work of not only the school and the parents but also that of the community. Pye died in 1949 in the Melbourne suburb of Toorak.
