= Melbourne Teachers' College =

Former teacher training college in Melbourne, Australia

Coordinates: 37.7998°S 144.9632°E

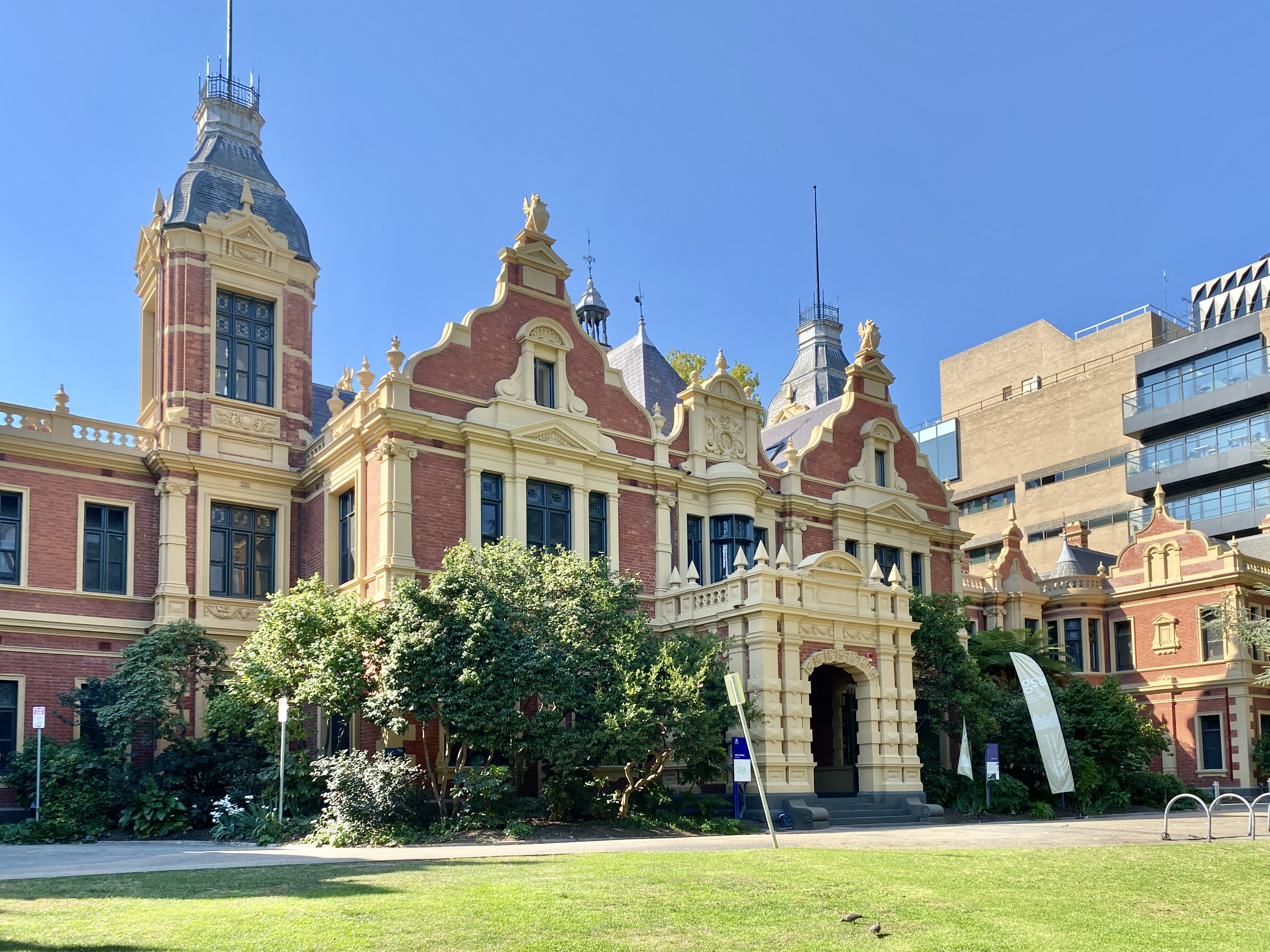
The 1888 Building

The Melbourne Teachers' College is a former Australian college. The college was built in 1889-92 as the principal teacher training institution for the state of Victoria. Its original and later buildings are on the corner of Grattan Street and Swanston Street in Carlton on the later extended grounds of the University of Melbourne. After various added buildings and name changes in the following century, in 1989 it was amalgamated with the university.

== History ==
The earliest formal system of teacher training in Victoria was provided by the National School Board at the Model School in East Melbourne, which was established in 1855 but closed in 1859 in favour of an apprentice-based pupil teacher training program. In 1866 a royal commission revealed a lack of training and widespread incompetence among teachers, and the school was reopened as the Board of Education's Training Institution in 1870. With the establishment of free and compulsory primary schooling in 1872, the requirement for new teachers grew substantially. It was felt that teachers would benefit from proximity to Melbourne University, and after years of negotiation, in 1887 four acres (1.657 hectares) of the south east corner of the grounds was provided to the Education Department.

A grand Queen Anne style home for a teacher training college was designed within the Public Works Department, and constructed in 1889-92, initially known as the Training Institution. The building was constructed in stages and organised around the segregation of male and female trainees with separate lecture rooms, retiring rooms, and dormitories. The first stage was completed in 1889, comprising the central section with the principal teaching spaces. The west wing for female teachers was completed in 1891 and the east wing for male students was completed in 1892. In 1893, the College was closed due to the 1890s economic crisis, and between 1894 and 1898 it operated as a private school called the University High School.

Following an enquiry into education, the college was reopened as the Training Institution in 1900. One of the system's critics, Frank Tate, was appointed as the first principal. When he became the Director of Education in 1902, Tate was replaced by John Smyth, who wanted all primary teachers to be trained in the latest methods. Smyth chose Emmeline Pye as one of his first recruits to lecture the college's students who were studying for an Infant Teachers' Certificate. In addition Pye showed them kindergarten methods at the Central Brunswick Practising School. Pye led that school's infant department from 1904. Interest was high and Pye demonstrated teaching methods at the Australian Exhibition of Women's Work in Melbourne in 1907. In 1908, she officially joined the college's staff. The college organised summer schools at Portsea at which Pye, Smyth and Tate all assisted.

In 1940, extensive building works were undertaken to expand facilities, with the construction of a new building behind, designed by the state's chief architect, Percy Everett, in Art Deco style. The Secondary Training College (later the Secondary Teachers' College, STC) was established in 1950, and in 1972 the STC and the VTC were amalgamated to form the Melbourne State College (later renamed the Melbourne College of Education). Further new facilities were added to the north in the early 70s. The Melbourne College of Education amalgamated with the University of Melbourne in 1989. The college building then became known as the 1888 Building.

Features include stained glass windows and ceramic tiled portraits commemorating the staff and students who served in the First World War. The stained glass windows include a roll call of those staff and students.

== Gryphon Gallery ==
During the 1970s and until 1994 the Gryphon Gallery in the 1888 Building exhibited art by college lecturers. It was a condition of employment that lecturers in art and drama were required to be practicing exhibiting artists.

In 1977, Noel Flood (head of the Department of Ceramics) and John Teschendorff (lecturer in ceramics) held a two-man show titled "Recent Handcrafts and Other Objects", making a mocking reference to the popular view at the time of pottery as craft. The Gryphon Gallery also exhibited student work.
