= Hugh Pye =

Australian agricultural educator and wheat breeder

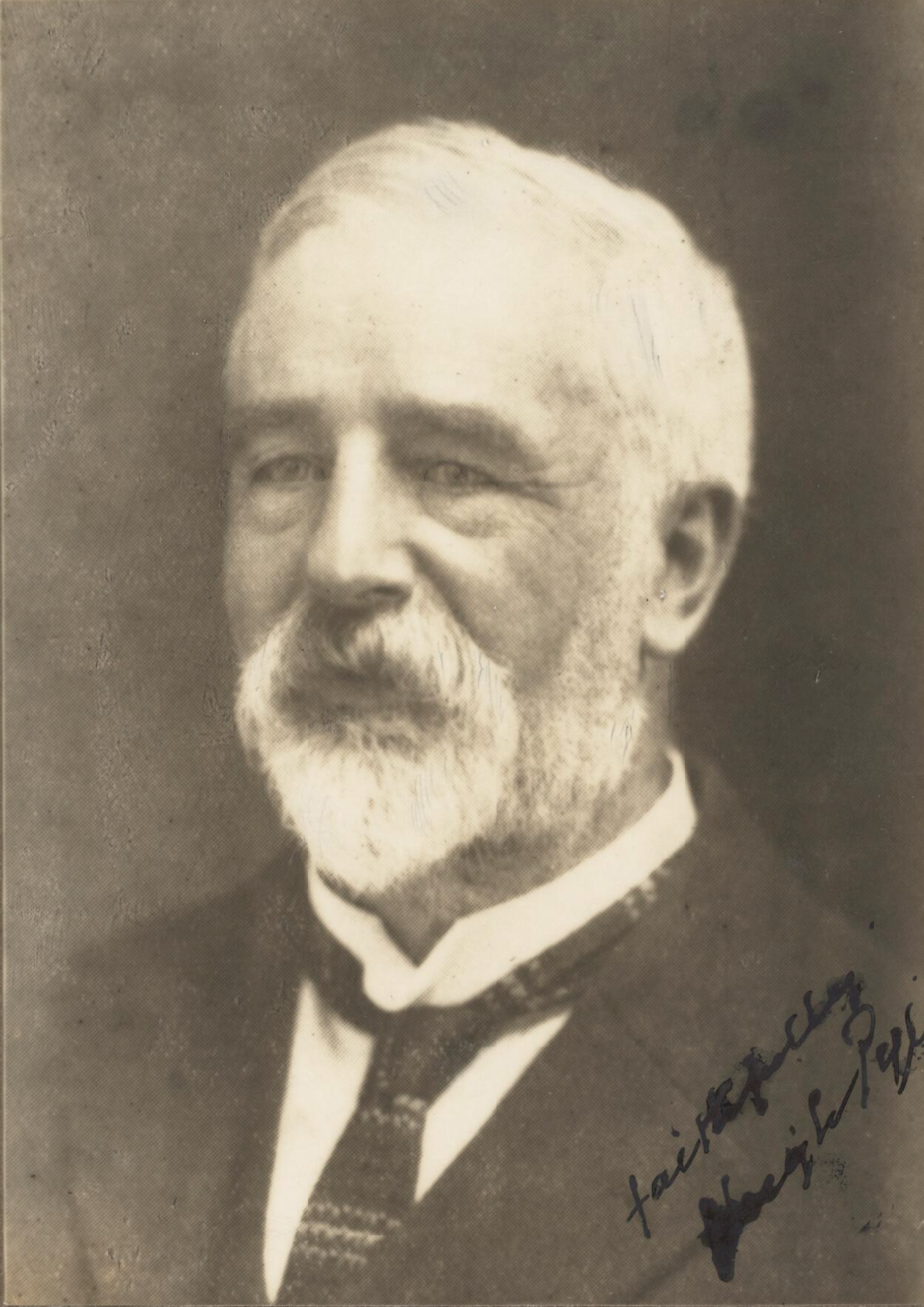
- Hugh Pye, c. 1935
- Born: 1 January 1860; Ascot, Victoria, Australia
- Died: 22 August 1942 (aged 82); Armadale, Victoria, Australia
- Known for: Wheat breeding (Currawa, Major)
- Scientific career
- Fields: Agronomy
- Institutions: Dookie Agricultural College

Hugh Pye (1 January 1860 – 22 August 1942) was an Australian agricultural educator and pioneering wheat breeder. He taught at, and was later principal at Dookie Agricultural College, where he developed more than 100 wheat cultivars aimed at improving drought tolerance and milling quality for low- and medium-rainfall districts. His most successful variety, Currawa (released 1912), became the second most widely grown wheat in Australia during the 1920s.

== Early life ==
Pye was born in Ascot, now a suburb of Bendigo, to William Marsland Pye, a school headmaster, and Joanna Saunders (née Edwards). He attended Geelong State School, Christ Church Grammar School (where his father was headmaster) and Geelong Technical School, then completed two years of an engineering course at the University of Melbourne under parental pressure.

His sister was the educator Emmeline Pye.

== Career ==
After teaching science at St Kilda Grammar School, Pye joined Dookie Agricultural College in 1887. Initially interested in pasture improvement, he turned to wheat breeding after corresponding with William Farrer in 1889. Appointed principal of Dookie in 1894, he balanced administration with breeding work until 1916, when a dispute over agricultural education governance prompted him to resign and become Victoria’s government cerealist.

Among his notable releases were Improved Steinwedel (1899), Warden (1900), College Purple (1901), Minister (1917) and Baldmin (1926). By the mid-1920s, his cultivars Currawa, Major and Minister dominated Victorian sowings, and Major was the most widely grown wheat in New Zealand.

At the time of his death, Pye's varieties accounted for 80% of those grown in Victoria.

== Later life and legacy ==
Pye retired in 1931. A fellow of the Royal Horticultural Society of the UK, he was remembered as shy and genial whose “sincerity of purpose and intellectual honesty” influenced generations of agronomists.

== Personal life ==
On 10 February 1892 Pye married Jane Menzies Tough; the couple had two daughters. He died in Armadale, Melbourne, on 22 August 1942, aged 82, and was cremated.
