= Loan Exhibition of Women's Industries =

Coordinates: 51.4576°N 2.6082°W

The Loan Exhibition of Women's Industries was an exhibition held in Queens Villa, Queen's Road, Bristol which opened on 26 February 1885 and ran until the end of April. It highlighted the work of women, aiming to give them improved representation and encourage others to better appreciate them. 18,000 visitors attended over the course of the exhibition.

== History ==
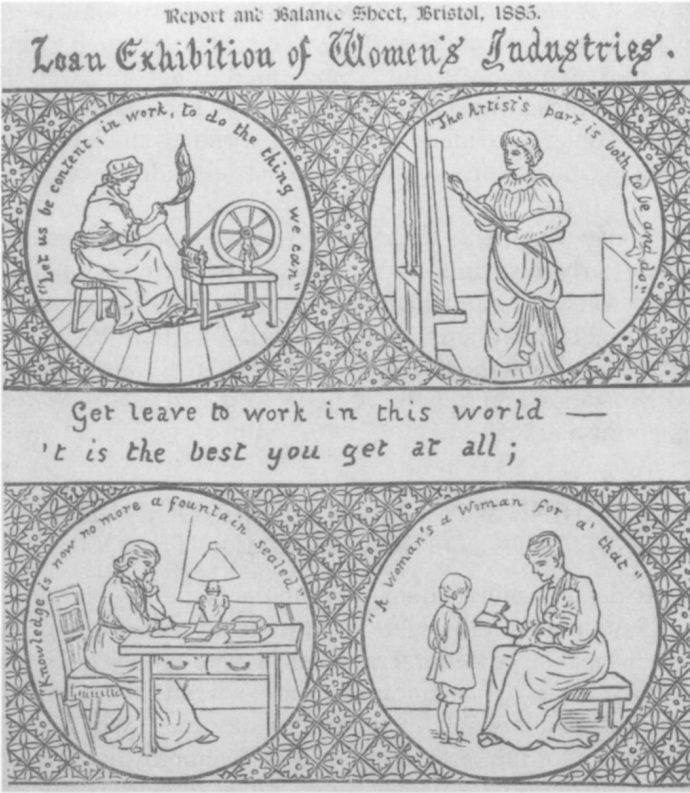
Cover page of the exhibition's catalogue.

Inspired by a previous Bristol exhibition called the Industrial and Fine Art Exhibition the previous year, Helen Blackburn formed a committee to organise an exhibition to encourage "opportunities afforded women for scientific study and technical training" who began contacting local women's societies and employers around the country. These organisations then submitted exhibitions to the committee for approval.

== Exhibition ==
"Might he not say that that Exhibition with all its variety - all its beautiful and excellent objects - the work of women's hands - would at least have this result, a higher general appreciation of the skill, the talent and the genius of women. And if with increased appreciation there would naturally be some added energy to give rise to a movement for increased scholastic establishments that would have for their special object the technical training of women - then indeed that Exhibition would have accomplished a very great result." - Sir Joseph Weston, Mayor of Bristol, at the opening of the exhibition.

The exhibition ran from 26 February to the end of April 1885 and was located at the Queen's Villa in the Clifton suburb of Bristol. Only the work of women was exhibited, though several of the 303 exhibitors were men. The works shown at the exhibition were "done by women who make a profession in their pursuit, either for art's sake, or for the sake of earning a livelihood", according to the official catalogue. While the works were often made by working class women, the exhibition prioritised the visibility of the philanthropic women hosting their works.

Exhibitions at the event included oil paintings, pottery, architecture, floral displays, and metalwork. One room highlighted, with portraits, women who had been among the first in, or made important contributions to, their field.

A reduced price was offered on Saturdays to working class visitors. 18,000 visitors attended the exhibition over the course of its run.

Attendees complained that there often wasn't sufficient space for visitors, with the Pall Mall Gazette commenting that "every nook and corner of the moderate sized house in which the Exhibition is held is full".
