= Alice Mills (photographer) =

Australian photographer

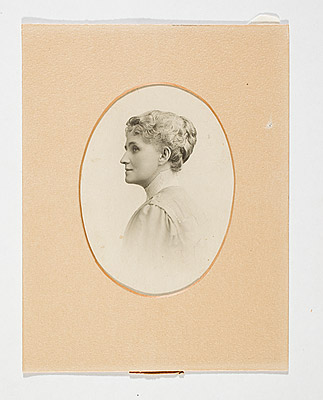
- Self-Portrait of Mills, gelatin silver photograph, (1910).
- Born: Alice Mills; 1870; Ballarat, Victoria
- Died: 1929 (aged 58–59)
- Education: c.1870 – c.1900 Emily Florence Kate O'Shaughnessy's photographic studio, Melbourne, Vic. c.1870-c.1900 Henry Johnstone's photographic studio, Melbourne, Vic.
- Occupation: Photographer
- Years active: 1900 – c.1927
- Spouse: Tom Humphreys

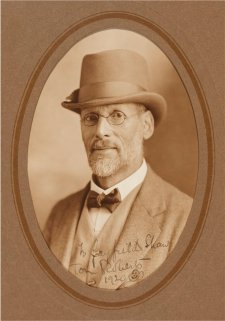
Portrait of Tom Roberts, gelatin silver photograph, (1920).

Alice Mills (1870–1929) was an influential professional photographer from Australia, active from 1900 to 1929. She established her name among the top photographers in Melbourne after seven years of work. After her death she stayed within that group for thirty more years.

== Life ==
Alice Mills was born in 1870 in Ballarat into a lower-middle-class family, briefly moving to New Zealand and back with her family when she was still a young girl. Growing up she was trained in the Melbourne studios of Henry Johnstone and Miss O'Shaughnessy. She married Tom Humphreys and established her life in the city of Melbourne, Australia. She didn't have any children.

== Photography ==
Alice began her photography career in 1900 with her husband Tom Humphreys, setting up at some stage between 1900 and 1907 her own studio in her name on Collins Street. At this stage, though, it appears that her husband became more involved in painting rather than photography. Alice Mills was a pioneer with regards to women's photography and by 1913 there were five more women that established themselves within her studio building.

In 1914 the war brought quite a lot more work in the photography business, especially portrait studio work. She consequently took many photos of young men who had turned into soldiers of war overnight.

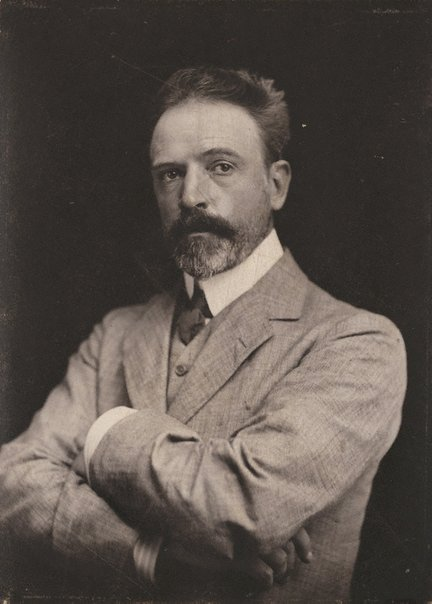
Untitled (Portrait of Arthur Streeton), platinotype gelatin silver photograph. (1905)

== Photography techniques ==
She practiced mainly with gelatin silver prints. This type of photography was dominant from the 1850s–1880s, which had to be exposed and developed immediately after coating. Albumen prints were the main ones over the period mentioned where the binder was egg white. Alice Mills worked from 1900 to 1929 when egg white was superseded by gelatin. She may have worked with platinum printing rather than silver giving a much more permanent image. The works seen appear to be platinum having a distinct soft grey appearance.

== Exhibitions ==
Alice's photography was often published in magazines, but she did have two exhibitions during her active photography period. In the 1907 Australian Exhibition of Women's Work, Alice Mill's studio portraits and press photographs of young men from war were mounted in a separate special display. Two posthumous shows called the National Women's Art Exhibition featured her work. One was held in the Art Gallery of New South Wales, in Sydney and the other was held in the National Library of Australia in Canberra. Both were held during the month of June in 1995–1998.

== Collections ==
Alice Mills has work in collections at the Art Gallery of New South Wales, Sydney, NSW, Australia and National Gallery of Australia, Canberra, ACT. These can all be viewed by the public.
