= Daisy Rossi =

Australian artist (1879–1974)

Daisy Mary Rossi (18 January 1879 – 4 August 1974) was an Australian artist, interior designer and writer. She is best known for painting portraits and impressionist landscapes and flowers.

== Biography ==
Daisy Rossi was born in Upper Wakefield, South Australia, in 1879 to William Rossi and Julia Emma Walter. Her mother was English and her paternal grandparents were Italian. In 1900 she moved with her family to Adelaide and began studying at the South Australian School of Design. She relocated to Perth in 1905, where she was tutored by painter Florence Fuller. The Western Australian Society of Arts began exhibiting her paintings in the same year, as well as her interior designs. Her work was also included in the 1907 Australian Exhibition of Women's Work.

In her early career, Rossi earned a living as a portrait painter; her subjects included the feminist Bessie Rischbieth and the architect George Temple-Poole, whom she would go on to marry in 1918. With the money from these commissions, she travelled overseas in 1909–1911, studying at the Grosvenor School of Modern Art in London. She established a studio upon her return to Perth, also working as an interior designer and a teacher at Fremantle Technical School. After visiting Europe, Rossi's style and the subject of her paintings changed, and most of her work became focused on landscapes and native wildflowers in the impressionist style. She was hired to create an installation to be featured in Savoy House in London but the project was never completed since it was abandoned in the midst of World War I.

Rossi joined the Australian Town Planning Association in 1917 as one of its first female members. In 1920, she and Temple-Poole had a daughter, Iseult. She continued painting—exhibiting her works around Australia and at the 1924 British Empire Exhibition in Wembley—until 1926, when her studio and her works from Europe were destroyed by a fire, and because of her worsening eyesight. She campaigned for social issues that affected women and the arts. She wrote for various publications under the pen names Eva Bright and Mary Temple, as well as lecturing and teaching art. She resumed painting briefly in 1960 when her eyesight improved. She moved to Victoria in 1966 and died on 4 August 1974. Some of her works are held by the National Trust of Australia and the Art Gallery of Western Australia.
