= Eirene Mort =

Australian artist, writer (1871–1977)

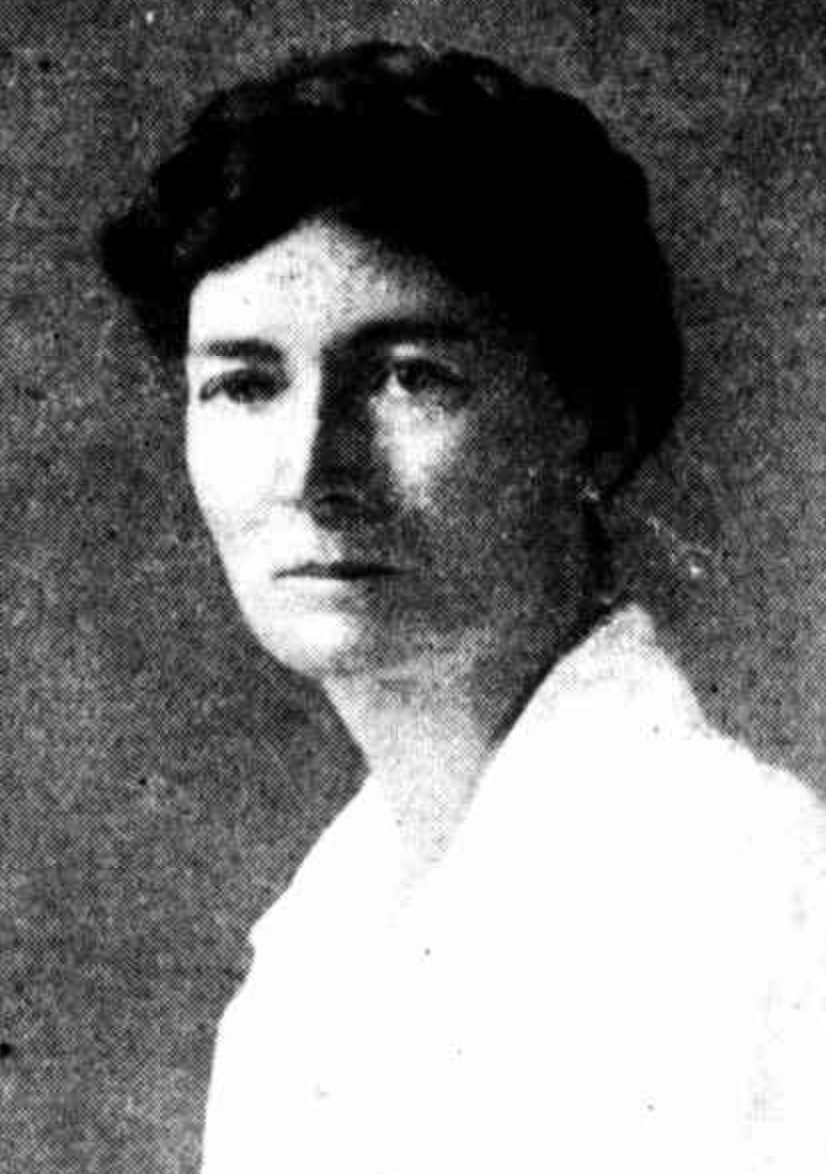
Eirene Mort in 1920

Eirene Mort (1879–1977) was an Australian artist, art teacher, printmaker, cartoonist, fashion designer and one of several founders of the Society of Arts and Crafts of New South Wales.

== Early life ==
Eirene Mort was born on 17 November 1879 at Woollahra. Her parents were Canon Henry Wallace Mort, an Anglican clergyman, and Kate Macintosh who was the daughter of Robert Isaacs. Mort attended St Catherine's Clergy Daughters' School in Waverley where her headmistress, Helen Phillips, encouraged her pursuit of art and allowed her to freely use the art studio which Phillips had donated to the school in 1884 and which is now used as a museum. Mort won the University of Sydney medal for Design in 1897 in her final school exams.

Mort studied painting with Antonio Dattilo-Rubbo and Albert Fullwood. In London, she studied at the Grosvenor Life School, the Royal School of Art Needlework and the Royal College of Art, South Kensington.

== Career ==
Mort illustrated articles she wrote for the Sydney Mail and Art and Architecture, and illustrated several books including Florence Sulman's A Popular Guide to the Wild Flowers of New South Wales (1913), The Story of Architecture (1942), and Selwyn Mort's Coins of the Hapsburg Emperors 1619–1919. She also wrote and illustrated books about Australian fauna and flora for children including Country cousins. Mort favoured Australian materials and motifs in the decorative arts.

Mort and Nora Weston established a graphic design studio in Sydney in 1906. They offered craft, drawing, design, wood carving, metalwork and book-binding lessons.

Mort was a founder of the Society of Arts and Crafts of New South Wales and one of the organisers of the Australian Exhibition of Women's Work in 1907 which featured 16,000 exhibits and more than 250,000 people in attendance. Mort had hundreds of entries in a variety of classes. They were noted for her use of Australian flora and fauna as subject matter.

Mort moved to Mittagong in 1937 and taught at Frensham School. After retiring from the school in 1949, she continued to pursue her artistic career.

The National Gallery of Australia collection includes 349 items of Mort's work.

== Personal life ==
Mort lived with her partner, the wood artist Nora "Chips" Weston, in Vaucluse and later in the southern highlands. Mort died at Bowral on 1 December 1977.
