= Florence Maude Ewart =

English violinist and composer (1864–1949)

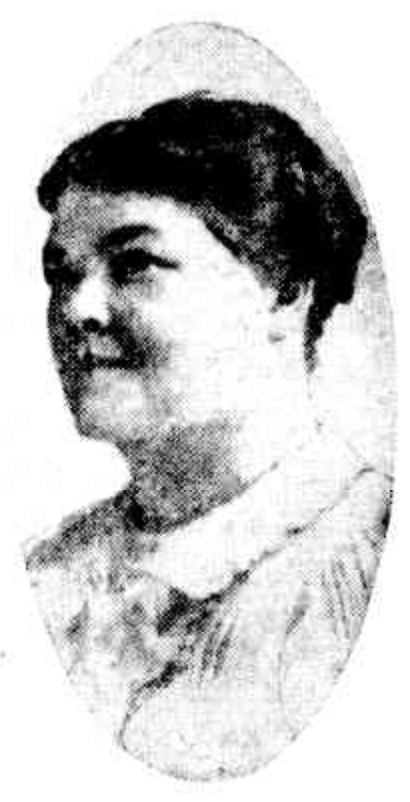
- Florence Maude Ewart in 1912
- Born: 16 November 1864; London, England
- Died: c.8 November 1949; South Yarra, Victoria
- Occupations: Composer, violinist, music educator
- Spouse: Alfred James Ewart

Florence Maude Ewart (16 November 1864 – c.8 November 1949) was an English violinist, music educator and composer who lived and worked in Australia.

== Biography ==
Florence Donaldson was born in Kentish Town, London, the daughter of accountant Frederick William Donaldson and his wife Elizabeth Lewis. Ewart studied violin with John Carrodus and made her début as a violinist at age 14 at the Albert Hall, London. She won one of the first twelve Birmingham scholarships to the South Kensington National Training School, later the Royal College of Music, and continued her studies in Leipzig and Berlin with Joseph Joachim. After completing her studies, she worked in Birmingham as a conductor, violinist and music lecturer. In December 1898, she married Alfred James Ewart, whom she had met in Leipzig, at the parish Church of St. Paul, Oxford. The couple settled in Birmingham and had two sons born in 1900 and 1902.

In 1906 the Ewart family moved to Melbourne, Australia, and a rheumatic condition ended Florence's career as a violinist. In 1907 she served as co-conductor for the first Australian Women's Work Exhibition, and won first prize for her composition "God Guide Australia", an anthem with words by Annie Rattray Rentoul.

Ewart travelled abroad, and in 1920-21 visited Italy and Paris and became influenced by Debussy's music. She asked for a separation from her husband and studied composition intensively in Europe from 1924 to 1928 with composer Ottorino Respighi. Her husband petitioned for a divorce, granted in December 1929. Ewart expanded her work as a composer, producing six opera and a number of songs and instrumental works. Her music was performed for the Musical Society of Victoria and at the Melbourne University Conservatorium. Ewart died at her home in South Yarra.

== Works ==
Ewart composed for voice, orchestra, instrumental performance, and opera. Her papers are archived at the Grainger Museum at the University of Melbourne. Selected works include:

- Ekkart, opera (1926)
- The Courtship of Miles Standish, opera (1931)
- Mateo Falcone, opera
- Nala's Wedding, opera, under the pseudonym "Sonia Aldon"
- A Game of Chess, opera
- Pepita's Miracle, opera (1945)
