= The Society of Arts and Crafts of NSW =

The Society of Arts and Crafts of NSW is a guild of artists in New South Wales, Australia established in 1906. It could be the oldest Australian craft organisation. The society continues as Craft NSW.

== History ==
The society was founded by six practicing craftspeople in Mosman in 1906. The Danish emigrant woodcarver Susanne Vilhelmine Gether soon joined and, by the December, meetings were being held in Gether's studio. In 1907 there was an Exhibition of Women's Work which had been organised by the Governor General's wife, Lady Northcote. Gether designed a dining set with six chairs for the exhibition. It was carved from rosewood by the Society's members and over 60 pupils. The dining set was sent to London where it shown as part of the Franco-British Exhibition in 1908 as part of what became known as "White City".

The Society held its own first exhibition in 1907 and annually into the 1930s, with exhibitions of metalwork, jewellery, pottery, china painting, weaving, embroidery and pokerwork.

Gether resigned from the society when she discovered that there were lots of new members but they were people interested in crafts not practicing craftspeople. A campaign was launched to recapture the leadership and Gether rejoined, briefly, to be vice-president in 1910.

In 1974 the society established itself in the Sydney suburb of The Rocks.

In 2023 the group continues as "Craft NSW" run by craftspeople.

The society may be the oldest Australian craft organisation.

== Works ==
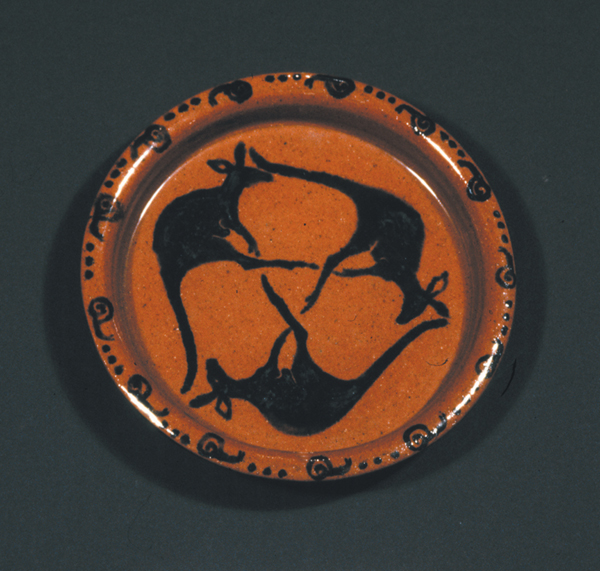
Pottery dish by Eirene Mort

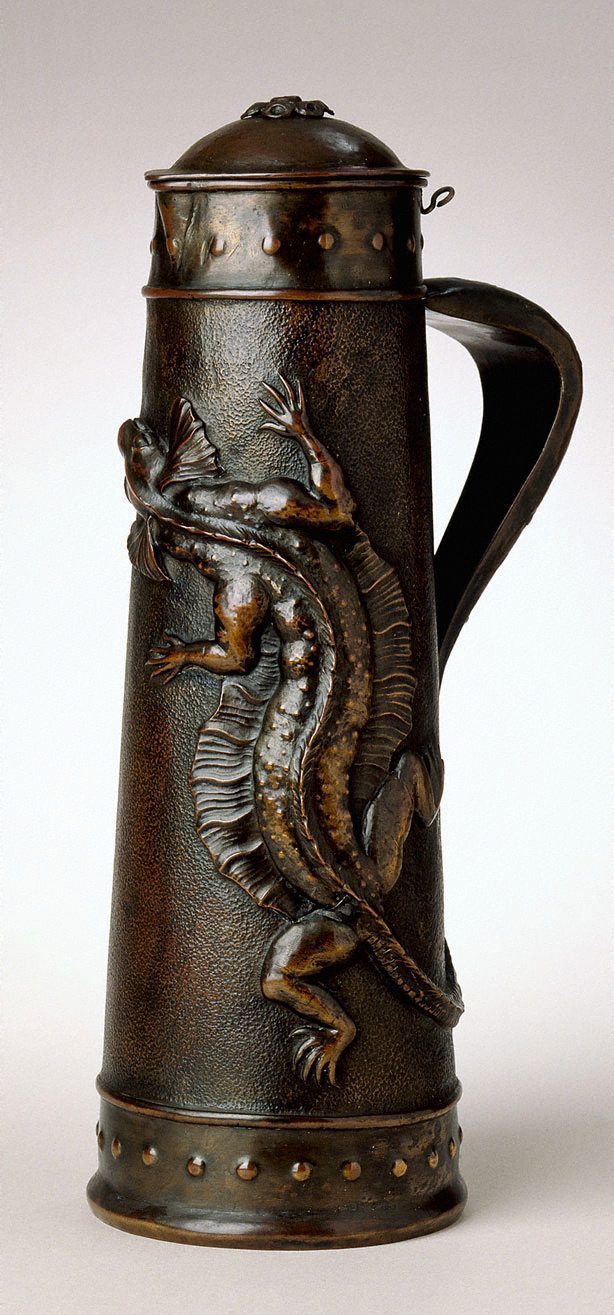
Tankard by Elizabeth Söderberg.

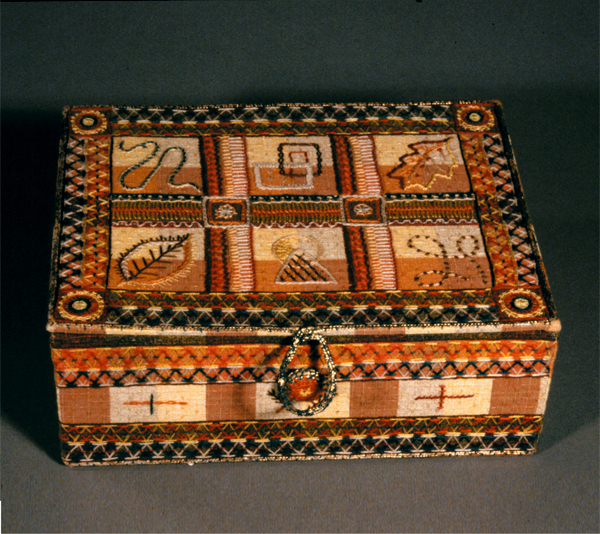
Embroidered box by Olive Nock.
