= Ida Rentoul Outhwaite =

Australian artist (1888–1960)

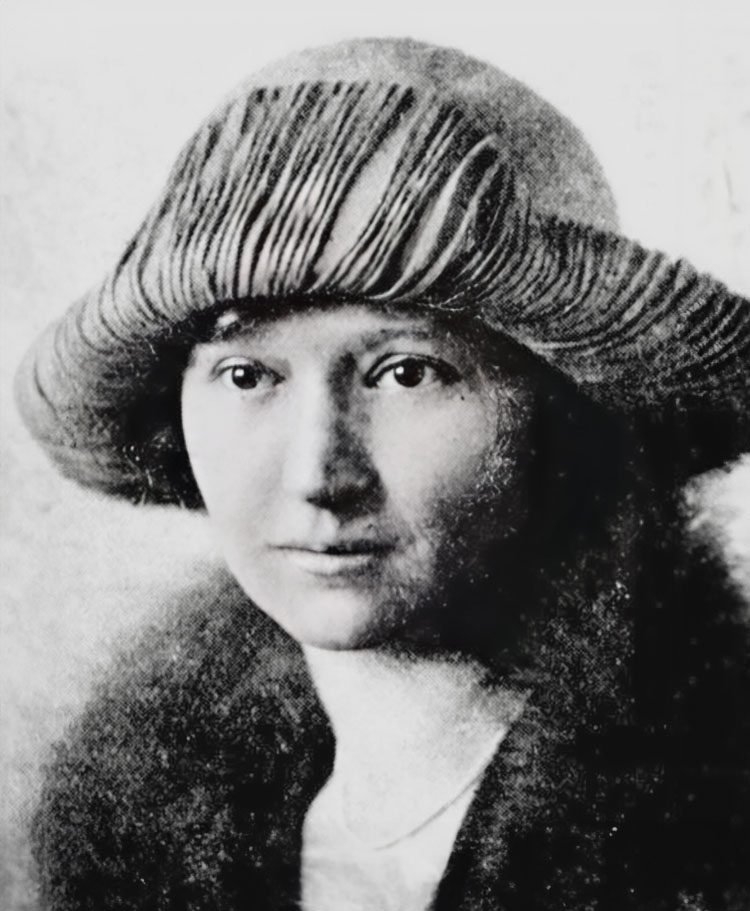
- Photo of Ida Rentoul, c1926
- Born: Ida Rentoul; 9 June 1888; Carlton, Melbourne
- Died: 25 June 1960 (aged 72); Carlton, Melbourne
- Education: Presbyterian Ladies' College, Melbourne
- Known for: illustrator
- Movement: Post-Federation Australian fairytales

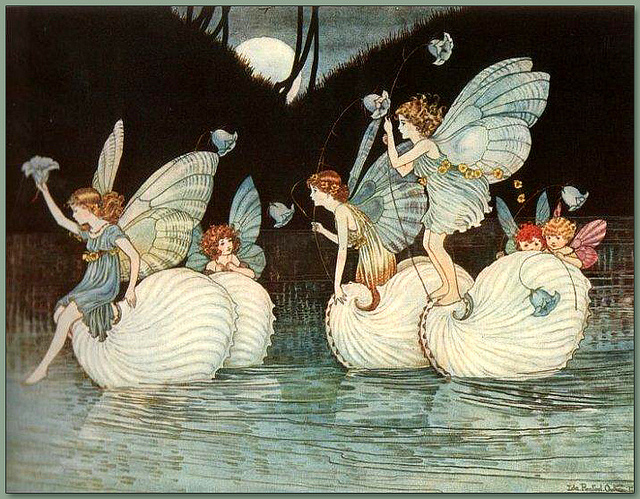
'Fairy Islands' from the book Elves and Fairies 1916 by Ida Rentoul Outhwaite

From Elves & Fairies by Ida Rentoul Outhwaite

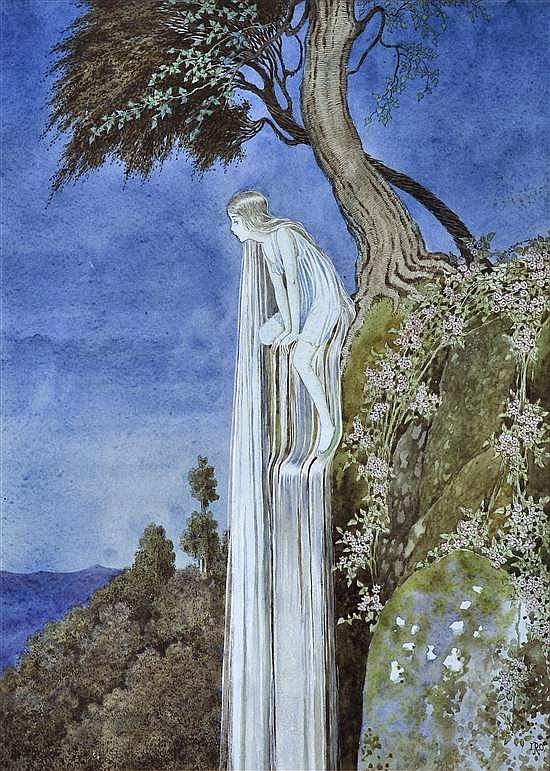
The Waterfall Fairy

From Elves & Fairies by Ida Rentoul Outhwaite

Ida Rentoul Outhwaite, also known as Ida Sherbourne Rentoul and Ida Sherbourne Outhwaite (9 June 1888 – 25 June 1960), was an Australian illustrator of children's books. Her work mostly depicted magical creatures, such as elves and fairies.

== Early life ==
Ida Rentoul was born in Carlton, Victoria, the youngest child of four and second daughter of the Rev. John Laurence Rentoul, an Irish-born Presbyterian minister and academic, and his wife Annie Isobel (née Rattray). At the time of her birth, her father was a professor at Ormond College, University of Melbourne, and later moderator-general of his church between 1912 and 1914. When World War I broke out, he became chaplain-general of the First Australian Imperial Force.

She was educated at Presbyterian Ladies' College, Melbourne. After she married Arthur Grenbry Outhwaite on 8 December 1909, she was generally known as Ida Rentoul Outhwaite. Before this, she had variously signed her work I.S.R. and at some point changed this to I.R.O. She also occasionally used I.S.R.O. and full spellings rather than abbreviations.

== Career ==
Outhwaite worked predominantly with pen and ink, and watercolour. Her first illustration was published by New Idea magazine in 1903 when she was just 15 years of age – it accompanied a story written by her older sister, Annie Rattray Rentoul. In the years that followed, the sisters collaborated on a number of stories.

In 1907 the important Australian Exhibition of Women's Work took place for five weeks in Melbourne. She and her sister showed their Australian Songs for Young and Old which included music by Georgette Peterson.

Following her marriage, she also collaborated with her husband – most notably for The Enchanted Forest (1921), The Little Fairy Sister (1923) and Fairyland (1926). In a number of cases, her children – Robert, Anne, Wendy and William – served as models for her illustrations.

== Works ==
Publications carrying her illustrations include:

- The Fairies of Fern Gully (1903)
- Mollie's Bunyip (1904)
- Mollie's Staircase (1906)
- Gum Tree Brownie and other Faerie Folk of the Never Never (1907)
- Before the Lamps are Lit (1911)
- Elves and Fairies (1916)
- The Enchanted Forest (1921)
- The Little Green Road to Fairyland (1922)
- The Little Fairy Sister (1923)
- The Sentry and the Shell Fairy (1924)
- Fairyland (1926)
- Blossom: A Fairy Story (1928)
- Bunny and Brownie: The Adventures of George and Wiggle (1930)
- A Bunch of Wild Flowers (1933)
- Sixpence to Spend (1935)
- Australian Bush Songs (1936)
- The Lost Princess (1937)
- A Bunch of Wild Flowers (1942)
- Musical Nursery Rhymes (1945)
- The Puddin' and the Pixie and other songs (1949)
- The Guinea Pig that wanted a Tail (1951)
- Legends of the Outback (1958) by Phyllis Power

Her works (including advertising images) were also published in periodicals and newspapers such as The New Idea, The Native Companion, Australia Today, and the British-Australasian.

Her illustrations were exhibited throughout Australia, as well as in London and Paris between 1907 and 1933.

== Legacy ==
She died in Australia at Caulfield, Victoria in 1960.

In her lifetime, she inspired a number of artists including Edith Alsop, Ethel Spowers, and Ethel Jackson Morris.

Her work is depicted in four stained glass windows in an adjoining hall at St Mark's Anglican Church in Fitzroy, Victoria.

In 1985 she was honoured on a postage stamp, depicting an illustration from Elves and Fairies, issued by Australia Post.
