= John Horder =

English physician (1919–2012)

John Horder FRCGP
- Born: 9 December 1919; Ealing, London, England
- Died: 31 May 2012 (aged 92)
- Education: University of Oxford
- Occupation: General Practitioner
- Known for: Leading community based health services
- Medical career
- Notable works: General Practice Under the National Health Service 1948–1997; The Future General Practitioner – Learning and Teaching

John Plaistowe Horder (9 December 1919 – 31 May 2012) was an English physician who worked as a general practitioner (GP). He led community based health services in the National Health Service. He was described as the "father of modern general practice" and also as "the Pope of Portuguese general practice".

== Early life ==
John Horder was born on 9 December 1919, to Gerald Morley Horder, a quantity surveyor, and his wife Emma. John had two sisters Ruth and Mary. Ruth, who would go on to marry Nobel Prize winner Sir Nevill Mott, and Mary who would later marry the French physicist Jacques Friedel. His uncle was architect Morley Horder. He was also a cousin of the eminent royal physician Lord Horder. Prior to having her children, Horder's mother Emma, played the violin and attended the Royal Academy of Music. His upbringing was in Ealing Green, west London. He was educated at Lancing College, Sussex.

He originally wanted to be a professional musician in which aim he was influenced and inspired by his grandfather who was a congregational minister. He recalled sitting next to the church organist at the age of 10 and was once given the keys to St Mary's Church in Elsworthy Road, Primrose Hill, so that he could rehearse there, as well as frequently playing at Tewkesbury Abbey in Gloucestershire. He was also interested in literature, philosophy and medicine, and became an accomplished pianist and proficient in watercolour painting.

Horder changed his mind about his ambitions at various times. His early education and schooling up until age 19, was concentrated on the humanities and, as a result, when he went up to Oxford University, he started as an open classical scholar, with breaks in Paris studying music. He subsequently switched to medicine as a result of the prospect of war in the 1930s and the desire to study human nature.

== Medical career ==
=== Early general practice ===
After studying medicine at the University of Oxford and then completing a medical registrar post at the London Hospital, Horder entered general practice in 1951 as a locum at John Wigg's practice at Kentish Town. Horder's wife, Elizabeth was already a part-time assistant there and he soon went into partnership with Wigg. The previous year had seen the publication of the J.S. Collings's report, which revealed stretched GPs in deprived, often sub-standard buildings with poor clinical standards. This was also a time when Horder was briefly chairman of the local division of the British Medical Association causing him to become increasingly disillusioned with general practice. He saw sarcasm, grumbling, and disturbing worries about money amongst his colleagues. In addition, there was a general opinion that the specialist was of superior status to the general practitioner. In 1952, as a result of the formation of the new College for General Practitioners founded particularly by John Hunt and Fraser Rose, Horder became one of its Foundation Associates.

Horder was an advocate of generalism and in 1952, used the example of James Mackenzie, founder of the London Hospital's cardiac department and generalist to argue his point, asserting the importance of protecting generalists in an age of mounting specialism. In addition, he defined the position of the GP as an educator and researcher. Horder was hopeful that heroes of general practice would one day exist, as they did for other specialities. More than 50 years later, Marshall Marinker argued that Horder had entered "the first rank of these leaders".

For a short time, Horder was involved with Michael Balint's research at the Tavistock, the report of which was published in The Doctor, His Patient and the Illness in 1957.

=== Other medical roles ===
In 1974, he co-founded the Leeuwenhorst European Study Group that produced an agreement about the role of general practice. He was at one time president of the section for general practice at the Royal Society of Medicine. Horder was elected president of the Royal College of General Practitioners (RCGP) from 1979 to 1982. On taking up the role of RCGP president, Horder discovered that for young GPs, the college had uncertain significance and questionable meaning, with time constraints being a key issue.

He chaired the review of general practice that produced The Future General Practitioner: Learning and Teaching. In addition, he was deeply involved in developing and implementing vocational training for general practice. He went on to found the Centre for the Advancement of Inter-professional Education (CAIPE) in 1987. He advised the Department of Health and Social Security on matters relating to general practice, a position he held for 6 years.

By the late 1980s, general practice was held in much higher importance and seen as the cornerstone of the National Health Service.

Horder was the first British general practitioner to be selected as a consultant to the World Health Organization.

== Illness ==
There was a history of depression in Horder's family and he too suffered from bouts of severe low mood throughout his life. He had a number of major episodes, the first occurring during the Second World War when he was dismissed from duties and admitted to hospital. Despite the success of the RCGP in promoting his ideals, the strains of a demanding practice and RCGP work in the 1950s contributed to a second episode of severe depression. He was originally a Jungian and sceptical of chemically altering the mind but later became an advocate for anti-depressants, particularly monoamine oxidase inhibitors (MAOI). He once described the pain of depression as more overwhelming than the pain of coronary thrombosis.

He was involved in the treatment of Sylvia Plath's depression in the last 3 months of her life (1962–63). Much later, he was deeply involved in the Defeat Depression campaign, organised by the Royal College of Psychiatrists and the RCGP.

== Later life and legacy ==
He was appointed a Commander of the Order of the British Empire (CBE). He instituted an annual John Horder Award for an "outstanding contribution by a member of the College staff".

Horder married Elizabeth June Wilson in 1940, the daughter of Dorothy Every Brown and Dr Maurice Wilson who died when Elizabeth was 5 and was the brother of writer and relief worker Francesca Wilson. Both of Elizabeth's parents were from prominent Quaker and Unitarian families. John and Elizabeth had 4 children, one of whom married the daughter of Australian–British chemist and Nobel Prize winner Sir John Warcup Cornforth.

A family man, Horder constructed model diggers with push and pull levers for his grandchildren.

Horder died on 31 May 2012. An annual John Horder Award is presented by the Royal Society of Medicine.

== Selected publications ==
- General Practice Under the National Health Service 1948–1997. Clarendon Press, Oxford, 1998. (Editor with Irvine Loudon & Charles Webster) ISBN 978-0-19-820675-0

=== Autobiography ===
Horder's autobiography was published in a series of instalments in the London Journal of Primary Care:

- "An Account of My Life", Vol. 1 (2008), No. 1, pp. 51–54. doi:10.1080/17571472.2008.11493203 (Part 1)
- "An Account of My Life", Vol. 1 (2008), No. 2, pp. 119–121. doi:10.1080/17571472.2008.11493227 (Part 2)
- "An Account of My Life", Vol. 2 (2009), No. 1, pp. 74–76. doi:10.1080/17571472.2009.11493251 (Part 3)
- "An Account of My Life", Vol. 2 (2009), No. 2, pp. 172–174. doi:10.1080/17571472.2009.11493278 (Part 4)
- "An Account of My Life", Vol. 3 (2010), No. 1, pp. 59–61. doi:10.1080/17571472.2010.11493299 (Part 5)
- "An Account of My Life", Vol. 3 (2010), No. 2, pp. 120–123. doi:10.1080/17571472.2010.11493316 (Part 6)
- "An Account of My Life", Vol. 4 (2011), No. 1, pp. 80–83. doi:10.1080/17571472.2011.11493333 (Part 7)
- "An Account of My Life", Vol. 4 (2012), No. 2, pp. 144–146. doi:10.1080/17571472.2012.11493353 (Part 8)
- "An Account of My Life – Reflection", Vol. 4 (2012), No. 2, pp. 147. doi:10.1080/17571472.2012.11493354 (Reflection)
