= Margaret Backhouse =

Margaret Backhouse may refer to:

- Margaret Backhouse (artist) (1818–1888), British portrait and genre painter
- Margaret Backhouse (Quaker) (1887–1977), British humanitarian activist
