= Definitions of education =

Definitions of education aim to describe the essential features of education. A great variety of definitions has been proposed. There is wide agreement that education involves, among other things, the transmission of knowledge. But there are deep disagreements about its exact nature and characteristics. Some definitions see education as a process exemplified in events like schooling, teaching, and learning. Others understand it not as a process but as the product of such processes, i.e. as what characterizes educated persons. Various attempts have been made to give precise definitions listing its necessary and sufficient conditions. The failure of such attempts, often in the form of being unable to account for various counter examples, has led many theorists to adopt less precise conceptions based on family resemblance. On this view, different forms of education are similar by having overlapping features but there is no set of features shared by all forms. Clarity about the nature of education is central for various issues, for example, to coherently talk about the subject and to determine how to achieve and measure it.

An important discussion in the academic literature is about whether evaluative aspects are already part of the definition of education and, if so, what roles they play. Thin definitions are value-neutral while thick definitions include evaluative and normative components, for example, by holding that education implies that the person educated has changed for the better. Descriptive conceptions try to capture how the term "education" is actually used by competent speakers. Prescriptive conceptions, on the other hand, stipulate what education should be like or what constitutes good education.

Thick and prescriptive conceptions often characterize education in relation to the goals it aims to realize. These goals are sometimes divided into epistemic goods, like knowledge and understanding, skills, like rationality and critical thinking, and character traits, like kindness and honesty. Some theorists define education in relation to an overarching purpose, like socialization or helping the learner lead a good life. The more specific aims can then be understood as means to achieve this overarching purpose. Various researchers emphasize the role of critical thinking to distinguish education from indoctrination.

Traditional accounts of education characterize it mainly from the teacher's perspective, usually by describing it as a process in which they transmit knowledge and skills to their students. Student-centered definitions, on the other hand, emphasize the student's experience, for example, based on how education transforms and enriches their subsequent experience. Some conceptions take both the teacher's and the student's point of view into account by focusing on their shared experience of a common world.

== General characteristics, disagreements, and importance ==
Definitions of education try to determine the essential features of education. Many general characteristics have been ascribed to education. However, there are several disagreements concerning its exact definition and a great variety of definitions have been proposed by theorists belonging to diverse fields. There is wide agreement that education is a purposeful activity directed at achieving certain aims. In this sense, education involves the transmission of knowledge. But it is often pointed out that this factor alone is not sufficient and needs to be accompanied by other factors, such as the acquisition of practical skills or instilling moral character traits.

Many definitions see education as a task or a process. In this regard, the conception of education is based on what happens during events like schooling, training, instructing, teaching, and learning. This process may in turn be understood either from the perspective of the teacher or with a focus on the student's experience instead. However, other theorists focus mainly on education as an achievement, a state, or a product that results as a consequence of the process of being educated. Such approaches are usually based on the features, mental states, and character traits exemplified by educated persons. In this regard, being educated implies having an encompassing familiarity with various topics. So one does not become an educated person just by undergoing specialized training in one specific field. Besides these two meanings, the term "education" may also refer to the academic field studying the methods and processes involved in teaching and learning or to social institutions employing these processes.

Education is usually understood as a very general term that has a wide family of diverse instances. Nonetheless, some attempts have been made to give a precise definition of the essential features shared by all forms of education. An influential early attempt was made by R. S. Peters in his book "Ethics and Education", where he suggests three criteria that constitute the necessary and sufficient conditions of education: (1) it is concerned with the transmission of knowledge and understanding; (2) this transmission is worthwhile and (3) done in a morally appropriate manner in tune with the student's interests. This definition has received a lot of criticism in the academic literature. While there is wide agreement that many forms of education fall under these three criteria, opponents have rejected that they are true for all of them by providing various counterexamples. For example, in regard to the third criterion, it may be sometimes necessary to educate children about certain facts even though they are not interested in learning about these facts. And regarding the second criterion, not everyone agrees that education is always desirable. Because of the various difficulties and counterexamples with this and other precise definitions, some theorists have argued that there is no one true definition of education. In this regard, the different forms of education may be seen as a group of loosely connected topics and "different groups within a society may have differing legitimate conceptions of education".

Some theorists have responded to this by defining education in terms of family resemblance. This is to say that there is no one precise set of features shared by all and only by forms of education. Instead, there is a group of many features characteristic of education. Some of these features apply to one form of education while slightly different ones are exemplified by another form of education. In this sense, any two forms of education are similar and their characteristic features overlap without being identical. This is closely related to the idea that words are like tools used in language games. On this view, there may be various language games or contexts in which the term "education" is used, in each one with a slightly different meaning. Following this line of thought, it has been suggested that definitions of education should limit themselves to a specific context without claiming to be true for all possible uses of the term. The most paradigmatic form of education takes place in schools. Many researchers have specifically this type of education in mind and some define it explicitly as the discipline investigating the methods of teaching and learning in a formal setting, like schools. But in its widest sense, it encompasses many other forms as well, including informal and non-formal education.

Clarity about the nature of education is important for various concerns. In a general sense, it is needed to identify and coherently talk about education. In this regard, all the subsequent academic discourse on topics like the aims of education, the psychology of education, or the role of education in society, depends on this issue. For example, when trying to determine what good education is like, one has to already assume some idea of what education is to decide what constitutes a good instance. It is also central for questions about how to achieve and measure the results of educational processes. The importance of providing an explicit definition is further increased by the fact that education initially seems to be a straightforward and common-sense concept that people usually use outside the academic discourse without much controversy. This impression hides various conceptual confusions and disagreements that only come to light in the attempt to make explicit the common pre-understanding associated with the term.

Many concrete definitions of education have been proposed. According to John Dewey, education involves the transmission of habits, ideals, hopes, expectations, standards, and opinions from one generation to the next. R. S. Peters revised his earlier definitions and understands education in his later philosophy as a form of initiation in which teachers share the experience of a common world with their students and convey worthwhile forms of thought and awareness to them. For Lawrence Cremin, "[e]ducation is the deliberate, systematic, and sustained effort to transmit, provoke or acquire knowledge, values, attitudes, skills or sensibilities as well as any learning that results from the effort". Another definition sees education as "a serious and sustained programme of learning, for the benefit of people qua people rather than only qua role-fillers or functionaries, above the level of what people might pick up for themselves in their daily lives'". The English word "education" has its etymological root in the Latin word "educare", which means "to train", "to mold", or "to lead out".

== Role of values ==
There are various disagreements about whether evaluative and normative aspects should already be included in the definition of education and, if so, what roles they play. An important distinction in this regard is between thin and thick definitions. Thin definitions aim to provide a value-neutral description of what education is, independent of whether and to whom it is useful. Thick definitions, on the other hand, include various evaluative and normative components in their characterization, for example, the claim that education implies that the person educated has changed for the better. Otherwise, the process would not deserve the label "education". However, different thick definitions of education may still disagree with each other on what kind of values are involved and in which sense the change in question is an improvement. A closely related distinction is that between descriptive and prescriptive or programmatic conceptions. Descriptive definitions aim to provide a description of how the term "education" is actually used. They contrast with prescriptive definitions, which stipulate what education should be like or what constitutes good education. Some theorists also include an additional category for stipulative definitions, which are sometimes used by individual researchers as shortcuts for what they mean when they use the term without claiming that these are the essential features commonly associated with all forms of education. Thick and prescriptive conceptions are closely related to the aims of education in the sense that they understand education as a process aimed at a certain valuable goal that constitutes an improvement of the learner. Such improvements are often understood in terms of mental states fostered by the educational process.

== Role of aims ==
Many conceptions of education, in particular thick and prescriptive accounts, base their characterizations on the aims of education, i.e. in relation to the purpose that the process of education tries to realize. The transmission of knowledge has a central role in this regard, but most accounts include other aims as well, such as fostering the student's values, attitudes, skills, and sensibilities. However, it has been argued that picking up certain skills and know-how without the corresponding knowledge and conceptual scheme does not constitute education, strictly speaking. But the same limitation may also be true for pure knowledge that is not accompanied by positive practical effects on the individual's life. The various specific aims are sometimes divided into epistemic goods, skills, and character traits. Examples of epistemic goods are truth, knowledge, and understanding. Skill-based accounts, on the other hand, hold that the goal of education is to develop skills like rationality and critical thinking. For character-based accounts, its main purpose is to foster certain character traits or virtues, like kindness, justice, and honesty. Some theorists try to provide a wide overarching framework. The various specific goals are then seen as aims of education to the extent that they serve this overarching purpose. When this purpose is understood in relation to society, education may be defined as the process of transmitting, from one generation to the next, the accumulated knowledge and skills needed to function as a regular citizen in a specific society. In this regard, education is equivalent to socialization or enculturation. More liberal or person-centered definitions, on the other hand, see the overarching purpose in relation to the individual learner instead: education is to help them develop their potential in order to lead a good life or the life they wish to lead, independently of the social ramifications of this process.

Various conceptions emphasize the aim of critical thinking in order to differentiate education from indoctrination. Critical thinking is a form of thinking that is reasonable, reflective, careful, and focused on determining what to believe or how to act. It includes the metacognitive component of monitoring and assessing its achievements in regard to the standards of rationality and clarity. Many theorists hold that fostering this disposition distinguishes education from indoctrination, which only tries to instill beliefs in the student's mind without being interested in their evidential status or fostering the ability to question those beliefs. But not all researchers accept this hard distinction. A few hold that, at least in the early stages of education, some forms of indoctrination are necessary until the child's mind has developed sufficiently to assess and evaluate reasons for and against particular claims and thus employ critical thinking. In this regard, critical thinking may still be an important aim of education but not an essential feature characterizing all forms of education.

== Teacher- or student-centered ==
Most conceptions of education either explicitly or implicitly hold that education involves the relation between teacher and student. Some theorists give their characterization mainly from the teacher's perspective, usually emphasizing the act of transmitting knowledge or other skills, while others focus more on the learning experience of the student. The teacher-centered perspective on education is often seen as the traditional position. An influential example is found in the early philosophy of R. S. Peters. In it, he considers education to be the transmission of knowledge and skills while emphasizing that teachers should achieve this in a morally appropriate manner that reflects the student's interests. A student-centered definition is given by John Dewey, who sees education as the "reconstruction or reorganization of experience which adds to the meaning of experience, and which increases the ability to direct the course of subsequent experience". This way, the student's future experience is enriched and the student thereby undergoes a form of growth. Opponents of this conception have criticized its lack of a normative component. For example, the increase of undesirable abilities, like learning how to become an expert burglar, should not be understood as a form of education even though it is a reorganization of experience that directs the course of subsequent experience.

Other theories aim to provide a more encompassing perspective that takes both the teacher's and the student's point of view into account. Peters, in response to the criticism of his initially proposed definition, has changed his conception of education by giving a wider and less precise definition, seeing it as a type of initiation in which worthwhile forms of thought and awareness are conveyed from teachers to their students. This is based on the idea that both teachers and students participate in the shared experience of a common world. The teachers are more familiar with this world and try to guide the students by passing on their knowledge and understanding. Ideally, this process is motivated by curiosity and excitement on the part of the students to discover what there is and what it is like so that they may one day themselves become authorities on the subject. This conception can be used for answering questions about the contents of the curriculum or what should be taught: whatever the students need most for discovering and participating in the common world.

The shared perspective of both teachers and students is also emphasized by Paulo Freire. In his influential Pedagogy of the Oppressed, he rejects teacher-centered definitions, many of which characterize education using what he refers to as the banking model of education. According to the banking model, students are seen as empty vessels in analogy to piggy banks. It is the role of the teacher to deposit knowledge into the passive students, thereby shaping their character and outlook on the world. Instead, Freire favors a libertarian conception of education. On this view, teachers and students work together in a common activity of posing and solving problems. The goal of this process is to discover a shared and interactive reality, not by consuming ideas created by others but by producing and acting upon one's own ideas. Students and teachers are co-investigators of reality and the role of the teacher is to guide this process by representing the universe instead of merely lecturing about it.
