= Edith Alsop =

Australian artist

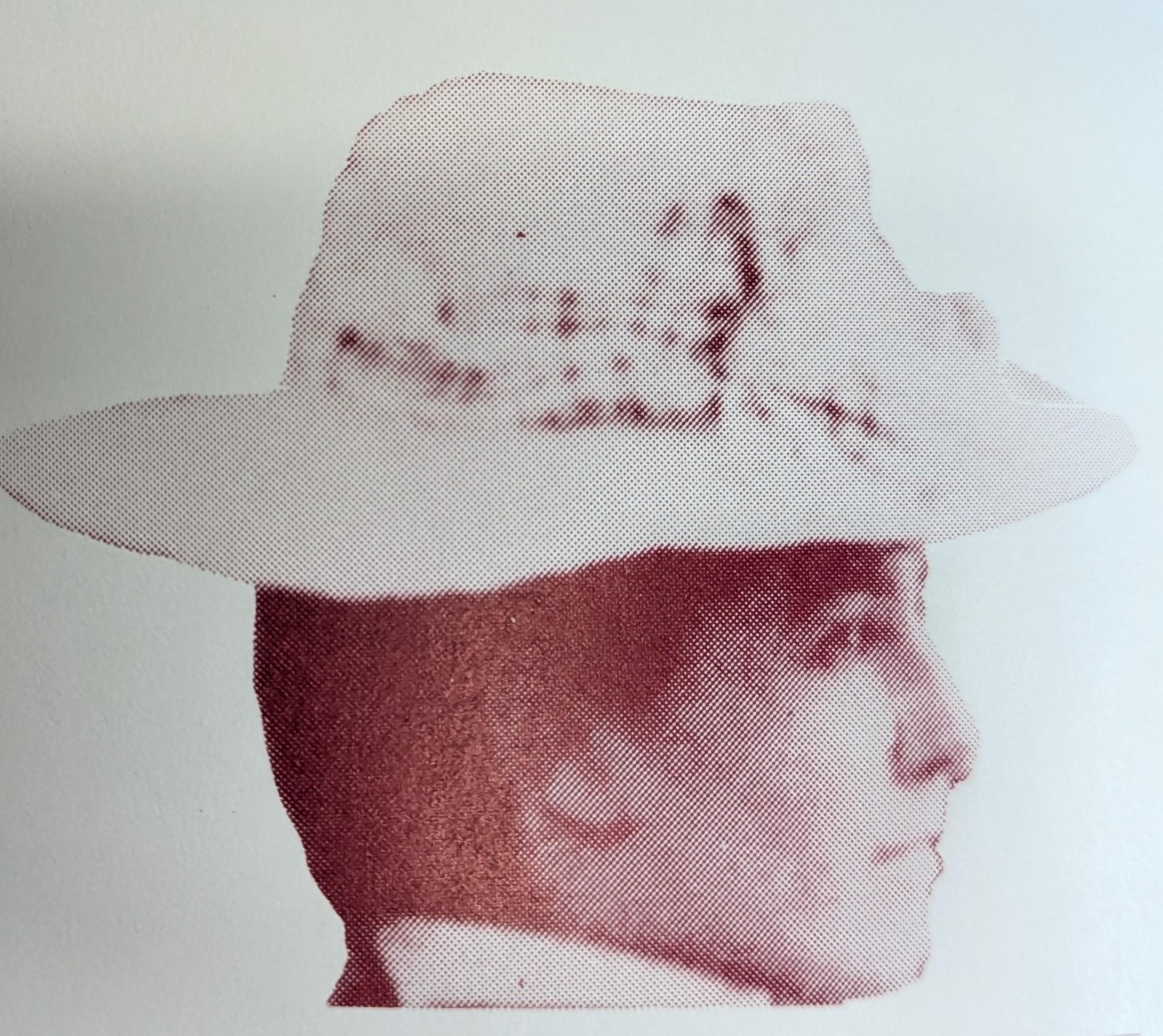
- Born: Edith Annie Mary Alsop; 28 August 1871; Hawthorn, Victoria, Australia
- Died: 10 October 1958 (aged 87); Croydon, Victoria, Australia
- Education: National Gallery School
- Known for: Book illustration, Woodcuts, Linocut, Painting
- Movement: Modernism

Edith Annie Mary Alsop (28 August 1871 – 10 October 1958) was an Australian artist.

== Early life ==
Alsop was born in 1871 in Hawthorn, Victoria to John Alsop and Anne Alsop (née Howard). She was one of five siblings, with younger sisters Florence and Ruth, and younger brothers Herbert and Rodney. Her father's family were from Derbyshire and voyaged five months to Australia, arriving in Adelaide in 1849. Her family were mine owners, and when the gold rush began they were forced to emigrate to Victoria in 1854 when they ran out of workers.

Her family settled on Studley Park Road in Kew where John started a career at the Melbourne Savings Bank. As a child Alsop attended Ruyton Girls' School where she studied music and painting. The family were very musical and before Edith's sister Florence was born, Anne acted as pianist for a Glee Club held at their home organised by a critic for the Argus. Edith herself learned piano and viola. Her first art teacher was a Portuguese artist who spoke no English and gave her lessons in French. His name was Artur Jose De Souza Loureiro and he taught at Ruyton, with Edith continuing her education with him after she left school. She also studied at the National Gallery School between 1898 and 1904 with intermittent breaks to travel overseas.

== Early career ==
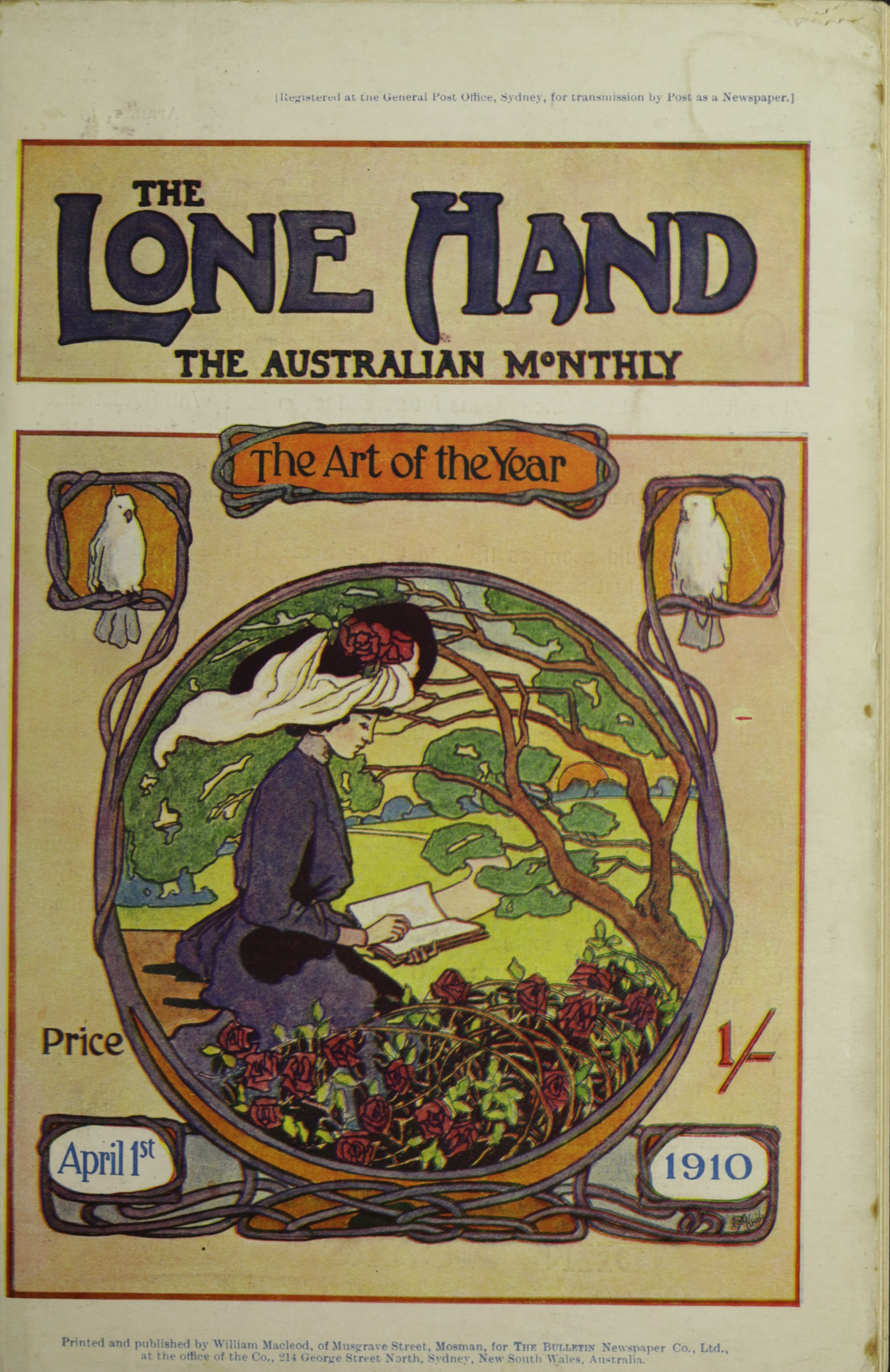
Cover for The Lone Hand magazine, 1 April 1910. Designed by Edith Alsop

Alsop first exhibited with the Victorian Artists' Society in 1903 while she was still a student. In 1904 Edith was awarded second prize in the anatomical figure section in the National Gallery section of students' works. In 1908 she won a coveted prize of designing the catalogue cover for the Arts and Crafts Society. She was an early member of the Melbourne Lyceum Club, exhibiting in 1899 with fellow artists May Vale and Janie Wilkinson Whyte.

Just like music, art was a family affair. An architect in the Arts and Crafts movement, Edith's brother Rodney would collaborate with his family for designing the interiors of houses. Rodney exhibited his architectural design at the same Arts and Crafts Society exhibition in 1909 that Edith exhibited her fairy scenes. This would be her first foray into fantasy illustration, with her collaborating in 1910 with Ida Rentoul Outhwaite to create panels for the children's ward at Melbourne's Homeopathic Hospital.

From here she would move into book illustration, with Some Childrens' [sic] Songs by Marion Alsop (no relation) and Dorothy McCrae featuring her designs. She went to Europe in 1912 where she studied book illustration at the Central School of Arts and Crafts in London. The outbreak of war forced her return in 1914 and in 1915 she contributed illustrations for Tales of the Fairies by Lewis Marsh. She was also illustrating magazine covers during this time, including The Lone Hand and The New Idea.

The most significant book illustrated by Alsop was The Cobweb Ladder by Joice Nankivell in 1916. Edith's fairy illustrations were described by The Herald as "appropriately fanciful and excellently drawn" and the Sydney Morning Herald "Miss Edith Alsop's illustrations have excellently reproduced its spirit and atmosphere." Despite this achievement, it would be the last children's book she would participate in. The triumph was somewhat overshadowed by Outhwaite's Elves and Fairies, which would be the start of a successful career in the genre.

Her musical sensibilities would continue in her art world involvement, helping organise a pageant play for the Victorian Artists' Society and designing the dresses. Along with sister Florence, Edith would give concerts for the Mission to Seafarers Victoria, and spend her breaks sketching portraits of the seaman to send home to their mothers.

By now Edith was living in Malvern with her parents nearby in Armadale. While the family was volunteering for war efforts she still found time for her art, becoming an office bearer for the Arts and Crafts Society in 1919. She was exhibiting her etchings along such notable artists of the time as Jessie Traill and Victor Cobb. Her mother Anne died in 1920 and father John in 1925 which left the siblings to sell the house and head abroad in 1928.

She returned to the Central School of Arts and Crafts, this time studying wood engraving. There was also portrait painting in Paris, where she studied under André Lhote. Her sketches from this time were reproduced in The Herald and woodcuts for greeting cards. While Edith documented their travels through art, her sister Florence wrote articles for the newspapers.

== Later career ==
Their return in 1931 was a new era for Alsop's artistic career. She exhibited her European works at the Everyman's Lending Library in Collins St Melbourne. She was a founding member of the Contemporary Art Group and the Independent Group of Artists. The influence of her time in Europe was evident in her work from this period, such as Hampton Court A Street in Paris, and Women of Tivoli. She befriended fellow printmakers Eveline Syme and Ethel Spowers, her black-and-white woodcut St Kilda illustrating Syme's "Women and art" essay in the Centenary Gift Book by Frances Fraser and Nettie Palmer.

Alsop exhibited for many years with the Victorian Artists' Society, the Yarra Sculptors' Society and the Lyceum Club. She also exhibited with the Contemporary Art Group until 1938 when it ceased with the formation of George Bell's Contemporary Art Society. When the society became too political she left along with others to follow Bell in forming new group, the Melbourne Contemporary Artists. She continued to exhibit with the Independent Group of Artists during this time and at least once with the group Forty Seven Painters.

Taking part in the artistic community was important for Alsop in learning and growing as an artist. She joined other artists in meeting to sketch and chat in Bell's studio. The Lyceum Club was also significant, with her being part of the Art Circle alongside many other female artists who would become friends. She also held one of her few solo exhibitions there.

The sisters spent the later part of their lives out in "the country" in a cottage in Croydon designed by Ruth. Her last solo exhibition was at Georges Gallery in 1946 and her last known exhibition was with the Independent Group of Artists in 1957, the year before she died.

== Legacy ==
The majority of Edith Alsop's surviving work was donated to the Ian Potter Museum of Art in 1983 by Dr Yvonne Aitken, an artist who lived opposite the Alsops in Croydon and became a lifelong friend. She is also represented in the National Gallery of Australia and the Bendigo Art Gallery.

The only major exhibition of her work, A study in rhythm and design: Edith Alsop (1871-1958) was by the Ian Potter Museum of Art in 2005.
