= Ruth Alsop =

Australian architect

Ruth Alsop (1879 – 1976) was the first woman qualified as an architect in the Australian state of Victoria.

The second youngest of the eight children of John and Anne Alsop, she was born in Kew, a suburb of Melbourne. She began work at her younger brother Rodney's firm Klingender & Alsop in 1907; she completed her articles in 1912. She continued to work with the firm until 1916, when she was forced to resign to take care of her parents, who were both ill. Alsop remained registered as an architect until 1927.

She designed a house in Croydon where she lived with her sisters Edith, an artist, and Florence, a journalist, until the 1950s.

Ruth Alsop Lane in Greenway, Canberra was named in her honour.
