= Margaret Backhouse (Quaker) =

English humanitarian activist (1887–1977)

Margaret Ann Backhouse (4 May 1887 – 23 March 1977) was an English humanitarian activist who accepted the Nobel Peace Prize on behalf of the Friends Service Council in 1947.

== Early life ==
She was born 4 May 1887 in Hurworth, Durham, the ninth of ten children of bank partner James Backhouse and his wife, Elizabeth Barclay Fowler. She was educated at the Quaker Mount School in York and belonged to the first cohort of Sunday school teachers trained at Westhill Training College, Birmingham.

In 1912, she accompanied the headmaster of Westhill, George Archibald, on a pedagogical tour of Australia, New Zealand, and Canada.

A teacher at Westhill from 1915, she was a travelling lecturer for the British Friends Society.

== Relief work ==
From 1943 to 1950 she was chair of the Friends Service Council and vice-chair of Friends Relief Service, which organised Quaker relief at the end of the World War II.

In 1947 the Nobel Peace Prize was awarded to the Friends Service Council "for their pioneering work in the international peace movement and compassionate effort to relieve human suffering, thereby promoting the fraternity between nations." Backhouse collected the prize and made an acceptance speech on behalf of the Friends Service Council where she highlighted the organisation's international relief work and the role of women within it. The prize was shared with the American Friends Service Committee, represented by Henry Cadbury.

Afterwards, she continued to travel for the Quakers, including as part of a peace delegation to the Soviet Union in 1951.

== Death ==
She died at her home in Sevenoaks, Kent, on 23 March 1977.
