= The Straits Impregnable =

1916 book by Sydney Loch

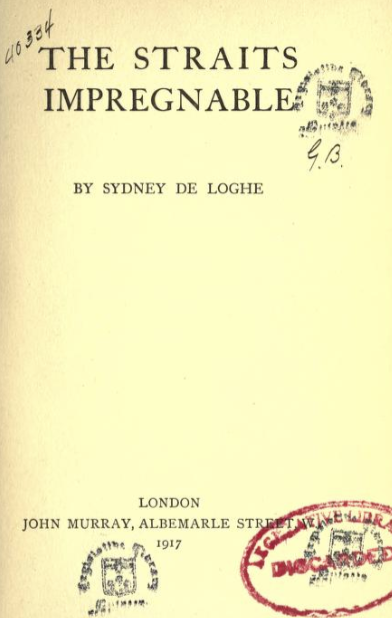
- Title page for The Straits Impregnable (1917)
- Author: Sydney Loch
- Language: English
- Genre: Autobiography
- Publisher: Australasian Authors Agency
- Publication date: July 1916
- Publication place: Australia
- Media type: Print
- Pages: 212
- Published under pen name Sydney de Loghe

The Straits Impregnable is a fictionalised autobiography written and published during the First World War. The author Sydney Loch had served in the First A.I.F. in the Gallipoli Campaign and the original manuscript was written as an autobiography of this service. By the time the manuscript was complete, Sydney had been returned wounded and sick to Australia and was still in active service. With wartime censorship in effect in Australia, his publisher Henry Champion advised that it should be edited and published as a novel to pass the censor. This was done and the first edition of 2,000 copies was well received and sold out quickly. Many names were changed with some very thinly disguised pseudonyms such as Capt. Carrot in place of Capt. Charles Bean. Sydney also used a pen name, Sydney De Loghe. The truthful and graphic portrayal of conditions at Gallipoli and their effects on the servicemen there made the book notable.

== Later editions ==
A second edition was printed shortly after the first but this time with a note in the cover that stated "This book, Written in Australia, Egypt and Gallipoli, Is true". This time the censor was aware that the book was in fact true and banned the book, all 2nd edition copies being pulped. The book was not banned. The censor threatened to ban it. After some negotiation, it was agreed that Sydney Loch write a series of articles in support of Australia’s war effort. This he did, and the articles were published in most Australian newspapers of the day. In 1917 other editions were published outside Australia, and then again in 2010. To Hell And Back, a biography of Sydney Loch that include most of The Straits Impregnable was written by Susanna and Jake de Vries and published in 2007.

== Other works by Sydney Loch ==
Sydney married Joice NanKivell Loch. Together they wrote Ireland in Travail (1922) and The River of a Hundred Ways; Life in the war-devastated areas of eastern Poland (1924). Sydney also wrote Athos, Holy Mountain (1957) which Joice completed editing after his death.
