= Gerontissa Gavrielia =

Greek nun and saint

Saint Gabrielia of the Ascetic of Love

Nun and Ascetic
- Born: Avrilia Papagiannis; 15 October 1897; Constantinople, Ottoman Empire
- Died: 28 March 1992 (aged 94); Leros, Greece
- Venerated in: Eastern Orthodox Church
- Canonized: 3 October 2023 by Ecumenical Patriarchate of Constantinople
- Major shrine: Church of the Panagia of Castle, Leros, Greece
- Feast: 18 July and 28 March
- Patronage: Leros

Gerontissa Gavrielia (Mother Gabriela), also known as Saint Gabriela of the Ascetic of Love (15 October 1897 – 28 March 1992) was a Greek Orthodox nun, known for her care of the poor and sick. She was the second woman to be admitted to a Greek university and was a trained physiotherapist prior to taking up her religious calling at the age of 60. She was canonized by the Holy synod of the Ecumenical Patriarchate of Constantinople on 3 October 2023.

== Biography ==
Avrilia Papayannis was born on 15 October (2 October O.S.) 1897 N.S. in Constantinople in the Ottoman Empire as the youngest child of Helias and Victoria Papayannis, a wealthy Greek family. She grew up in Constantinople and lived there until her family was deported during the 1923 population exchange between Greece and Turkey and sent to Thessaloniki. She entered the Aristotle University of Thessaloniki, becoming the second woman ever admitted to a Greek university, where she earned a degree in philosophy. She had previously graduated with a degree in botany at a Swiss university. In 1932, she moved to Athens and cared for nursing home residents until 1938 when she moved to England to study podiatry and physiotherapy, where she remained until the end of World War II.

== Career ==
In 1945, Papayannis returned to Greece and began working with the American Farm School and Friends Relief Service in Thessaloniki, until 1947, when she moved to Athens and opened a physiotherapy practice. For a decade she operated her office using funds from her paying clients to provide assistance to the poor. Upon the death of her mother, in 1954, she took a vow of poverty and gave all her worldly possessions away. The following year, she moved to India to work with the poor and assist Baba Amte in his work with leper communities in India. After four years of providing free physiotherapy to the poor, Papayannis went to the Himalayan Mountains, spending eleven months in solitude as a hermit. She then traveled to Landour where she met an American woman, who arranged for her to go to the monastery headed by Father Theodosius in Bethany, in the Holy Land in 1960. She arrived at the Bethany Community of the Resurrection of the Lord (Note: The Russian Orthodox archive account calls this monastery the "Monastery of Mary and Martha", Brady calls it the "Monastery of St. Lazarus" and the Orthodox Wiki calls it "the Monastery of Sts Mary and Martha in Bethany". The Greek Orthodox Church and St. Lazarus Monastery were not built until 1965. According to the Russian Ecclesiastical Mission of Jerusalem, two British women, who became Orthodox tonsured nuns in 1932, took the religious names Mary and Martha. They organized a religious community in Bethany, called the Bethany Community of the Resurrection of the Lord. Soon after its founding, the church authorities moved the community to Gethsemane where they became attached to the Church of Mary Magdalene. Though its name officially remains the Bethany Community of the Resurrection of the Lord, it is often identified as the Convent of Mary Magdalene.) and after accepting tonsure became a nun. After her three-year novitiate, Papayannis took the name Gavrilia.

Sister Gavrilia was sent to the Taizé Community in France by the Patriarch Athenagoras I of Constantinople, though her assignment there was brief. She was then sent to the United States, where she toured ethnic Greek communities in seventeen states and accompanied many mentally ill patients to psychiatric hospitals in Europe. After nearly a decade of touring, speaking, and helping the sick, she was sent to East Africa for three years to do missionary work. Following a brief assignment in Germany, Sister Gavrilia was sent back to India, where she remained for three years. In 1979, she was given use of an Athens apartment and became a "Gerontissa" (elder), counseling disciples and helping the sick over the next ten years. Near the end of her life, she retreated to a hermitage in Aegina, but when she developed Hodgkin's disease she returned to Athens. After a miraculous healing, she left Athens two years before her death and moved to the island of Leros. Gerontissa Gavrielia died on Leros on 28 March, 1992.

== Legacy ==
In 1996 a biography of her life entitled I Askitiki tis Agapis was published in Greek, in 1999 the book was translated into English, and in 2000 into Russian. It has since had 14 Greek editions, 2 English editions, and has been translated into Arabic, French and Serbian.

== Canonization ==
Elder Gavrielia was canonized by the holy synod of the Ecumenical Patriarchate of Constantinople on 3 October 2023.

The relics of Saint Gavrielia may also be venerated at the Greek Orthodox Church of Prophet Elias in Frankfurt, Germany.

== Bibliography ==
- Karellos, Nicholas (2001). "The Obedience of Love: An Interview with Sister Gavrilia" (PDF). Road to Emmaus: A Journal of Orthodox Faith and Culture. 2 (4 (#7)). Portland, Oregon: Richard Betts: 21–40. Archived from the original (PDF) on 28 March 2016.
- Marder, Brenda L. (1979). Stewards of the Land: The American Farm School and Greece in the Twentieth Century. Macon, Georgia: Mercer University Press. ISBN 978-0-86554-844-2.
- Murphy-O'Connor, Jerome (28 February 2008). The Holy Land: An Oxford Archaeological Guide from Earliest Times to 1700. Oxford, England: OUP Oxford. ISBN 978-0-19-164766-6.
- Nun Gavrilia (1999). Mother Gavrilia: The Ascetic of Love. Athens: Ekdoseis K. Papagiannoulis Tertios & Sia O.E. ISBN 978-960-7298-85-0.
