= Friends Relief Service =

Humanitarian relief organization

The Friends Relief Service (FRS) was a voluntary humanitarian relief organisation formally established by a committee of Britain Yearly Meeting in November 1940. Largely staffed by pacifists and conscientious objectors, its aim was to provide humanitarian relief and social welfare to civilians affected by World War II. Key areas of operation included British cities affected by The Blitz, and refugee camps throughout north-west Europe, the Balkans and the Middle-East. One of its teams was also amongst the first humanitarian groups to reach Bergen-Belsen concentration camp. The organisation had three changes of name: Friends War Victims Relief Committee (November 1940 - February 1942); Friends War Relief Service (February 1942 - September 1943) and the Friends Relief Service (September 1943 - May 1948). The FRS was closed down on May 29, 1948.

== Origins and establishment ==
When the Blitz began on 7 September 1940 there was no official Quaker body capable of acting in response, nor any Quaker organisation through which British Friends could make any relief contributions. Two groups of concerned Friends from the Friends' Ambulance Unit (FAU) and the Bedford Institute Association, who were already in East London, began to offer aid in the bomb shelters and to assist in organising evacuations. The work was hampered, however, by a lack of formal arrangements to mobilise available resources. Representatives of the FAU, the Bedford Institute Association and other action groups met and made a request for the establishment of an official committee to take responsibility for the spontaneous Quaker relief action that they had started.

After consideration, the Britain Yearly Meeting executive committee, Meeting for Sufferings, decided to establish an official Friends War Victims Relief Committee on the 1st of November 1940. It was the fifth committee of its kind established by Quakers, there had been previous civilian relief committees established in the Franco-Prussian War, the Russo-Turkish War (1877–1878) the First Balkan War and World War I. They had their headquarters in an office at Friends House, Euston Road and appointed Roger Wilson as secretary.

== Organisation ==
The first Friends War Victims Relief Committee meeting was held on 7 November 1940 at Friends House and was composed of 40 older Friends most of whom had experience of relief work that had been gained abroad in the past. This committee met monthly and had ultimate formal responsibility for the service, reporting to Meeting for Sufferings.

In January 1941 an executive committee was created, charged with responsibility for carrying out the decisions of principle that the main committee had made. It consisted of 13 members who met weekly, 10 of whom were actively involved in the service and three Quakers who were not. Additionally at this time officers were appointed to look after publicity and finance. From May 1941 substantial service departments were created to administer particular aspects of the work, including transport, works and equipment, hostels and a quartermaster's department, some of which were joint organisations with the FAU. In February 1942 the committee and the civilian relief section of the FAU were united as the Friends War Relief Service.

In September 1942 the first Representative Conference was held. This consisted of representatives from every level of the FRS. All members of the services were encouraged to bring forward their concerns through their representatives; no subject was barred. This became a regular six-monthly meeting to work out the constitutional procedure of the organisation and to consider the direction of FRS work.

Planning for the end of the war and the role of the service in its aftermath began at as early as February 1941. In the autumn of 1942, the British government's Board of Trade Relief Division summoned all voluntary societies that they thought might be interested in European post-war relief to a meeting. This resulted in the establishment of the Council of British Societies for Relief Abroad (COBSRA) in January 1943. The joint war organisation of the Red Cross and the Order of St John acted as the formal channel between members of COBSRA and the military.

Following all of these discussions, the Friends War Relief Service was redesigned, becoming the Friends Relief Service. The general administration continued as before, but the service was shaped into three sections:

- General Section - for all the work being done in Britain
- Refugee Section - incorporating the work of the Friends Committee for Refugees and Aliens
- Overseas Section - to handle all the short-term work abroad and then hand over to the Friends Service Council as emergency relief ended.

To pull the work of these sections together, a weekly "Ways and Means Committee" was formed, composed partly of members of the service and partly of outside Friends.

== Ethical Concerns ==
The call for civilian relief operations in Europe came before the work of the military forces was over. This posed several difficulties for FRS. As an official Quaker organisation, as a matter of conscience, they would not allow themselves to be involved in military operations. They also refused to wear a military uniform. Britain Yearly Meeting confirmed that they would not send members of FRS to any field of operations wearing khaki. Uniform had not been worn by FRS members working in the UK, members were identified by wearing the Quaker red and black, eight pointed Quaker Star.

The British Army had been issued a non-fraternization order, they were not permitted to have anything but formal relationships with Germans. This order was also applied to British relief workers in Germany. Quakers were well aware of the crimes of the Nazi regime, as the Friends Committee for Refugees and Aliens had been helping people to leave Germany and Austria since 1933, but they, and other members of the FRS, believed that to "draw distinctions on the basis of nationality" was wrong, and that they should be free to treat others as individuals and to use their own judgement.

Compromises were made, FRS agreed to wear battle-dress style uniforms in grey, and it was agreed that they had the right to withdraw on the grounds of conscience and to deal with Germans as they saw fit. Although solved quickly, these ethical issues did cause minor delays in teams going into the field.

== Membership ==
There were about 550 men and women in full-time service in FRS, dispersed over 50 working locations. Meeting for Sufferings asked that the proportion of Quakers to non-Quakers in the service be maintained at about 40%, in order to preserve the Quaker ethos in the work, and in the end about half of the total number of workers were Quakers. Other workers were pacifists or those who felt happier using their skills in a Quaker environment than in a more formal organisation. Most were of military conscription age, with a few older pacifists who came out of retirement to help.

FRS workers underwent a rigorous selection process, only 10% of those who applied were accepted. Those working abroad were required to have the right language skills.

== Training ==
Quaker relief training was a spiritual and social experience, designed to train relief workers to live adaptably in unforeseen circumstances. A sense of confidence in human relationships was given supreme importance. Workers were also trained in how to deal with uncomfortable living conditions, conditioned by physical exercise, given technical instruction on relief problems such as hygiene and feeding organisation, given language instruction where necessary, and taught courses on political, social and cultural conditions in Europe. Additional specialist training included refugee administration at Bloomsbury House, driving and midwifery.

The first relief workers were trained at 'Spiceland', a training centre consisting of the Spiceland Quaker meeting house and Blackborough House in Cullompton, Devon. Training was also carried out at Selly Oak, Birmingham. New premises for training were found in 1943 at 'Mount Waltham' in Finchley, North London, and towards the end of the war training was also carried out in Swiss Cottage and Kensington.

== Work in the United Kingdom ==
Roger Wilson described the work of the Friends Relief Service in Britain as "rendering personal service on a human level to those whose physical resources were fairly, or even quite, adequate but who for a variety of reasons were incapable of using them" From 1940 to 1944 the FRS developed into a fairly large relief organisation in Britain, with 200 workers in the field and a transport system capable of linking together more than 50 centres throughout the country.

=== Air Raid Shelters ===
Teams supplied first aid and canteen help to air raid shelters in London, Birmingham, Liverpool, Coventry, Bristol, Southampton, Glasgow, Plymouth and Hull.

=== Evacuation ===
Quakers noticed that older people had been left out of official evacuation planning. The official system had then offered bombed-out older people accommodation in old workhouses, insensitive to the emotional horror this would have for the working classes. FRS teams firstly evacuated older people to Quaker meeting houses and halls in the country, and then set up evacuation hostels which, at their peak in 1942, cared for 450 elderly evacuees. The lessons that FRS members learnt through this work was collected in a report for the Nuffield Trust, providing useful evidence for future work into the needs of older people

The evacuation work went on to include children, mothers with babies and disabled people. Between 1940 and 1946 FRS operated 80 different hostels. FRS members also worked to ease tensions between groups of evacuees and the residents of the areas they were moved to. Much of this work was supported by local Quaker meetings.

=== Welfare Work ===
When heavy bombing ceased, in May 1941, the FRS began to focus on social work with British civilians impacted by the war. In collaboration with other Christian groups, they ran clubs for young people in the cities they had supported during the bombing, whose homes and environments had been destroyed and who might have one or both parents absent or engaged in war work. Members of the FRS were also placed in Citizens' Advice Bureaux around the country, and they operated a mobile Citizen's Advice Bureau.

In Liverpool they set up a Friends Service Centre, where locals could come for support and to use workshops to repair their furniture. The responsibility for this centre was handed to the Quaker meeting in Liverpool in 1945, and it remained open until 1949.

In Birmingham the FRS formed a committee with the local Adult School Union to create the Burlington Hall Neighbourhood Centre, which provided social clubs and classes for all ages. This became independent in 1945, and was open until 1970, when it was subject to a compulsory purchase order by the Corporation of Birmingham

=== Works and Equipment ===
The works and equipment section operated stores of clothing, food and furniture around England, taking in donations from the American Friends Service Committee and the International Commission for Refugees as well as businesses and private individuals. These supplies were sorted, repaired if necessary, and re-distributed. They were initially required for evacuation and refugee hostels in the UK, including those operated by other organisations, but from 1944 they were used to supply overseas work.

== Work in France ==
Prior to 1939, the British Friends Service Council had been working alongside the American Friends Service Committee (AFSC) to provide relief to Spanish Civil War refugees on the southern French border. This work had been continued by the Americans, and then handed over to local people, who formed an organisation known as Secours Quaker. In 1944, the FRS decided that rather than begin their own operation in France they would instead offer workers and supplies to support the work of Secours Quaker. This enabled them to be the first British relief organisation to be granted visas to enter France and aided them in their relations with Allied forces, as well as allowing French control of the work going on in their own country. FRS officially withdrew from France in June 1946, although British and American Quakers continued to work with Secours Quaker, sponsored by FRS, until the end of 1948.

=== Transport ===
The ability to supply materials where they were needed was the first priority. FRS purchased 6 3-tonne trucks, which were based in Caen and Le Havre and driven by FRS members. They transported building supplies from areas where there had been no destruction to the towns and villages of Normandy that had been devastated by fighting. They also delivered medical supplies, farming implements and food.

=== Food & Clothing ===
There was little availability of clothing or material in post-War France. The Allied invasion had taken place in the summer months, so those who lived in battleground areas had been wearing their summer clothes as they escaped and had lost their winter clothing along with their homes. Each Secours Quaker delegation ran a "vestiaire", supplying emergency clothing. The FRS encouraged British people to make "pochettes" - a small coloured tin containing cotton, darning wool, buttons, needles and pins - as a gift to those in Europe who were unable to get those items, and thousands were distributed.

The need for food was particularly dire in the south of France. All southern Secours Quaker delegations ran food distribution schemes targeting children, older people, refugees and TB sufferers. In June 1945, workers in Marseille reported that 2000 children and young people were receiving food in 8 centres, this had risen to 3000 in 1946. They were receiving a hot milk-chocolate drink with cheese, jam or chocolate and vitamin supplements. Workers went into schools, universities, prisons and factories to supply food where it was most needed.

Food and clothes were also supplied to camps holding Axis prisoners of war, collaborators and displaced people in transit. Conditions in these camps were often poor, and Secours Quaker was particularly asked to supplement the rations of food available for children.

=== Housing ===
Homelessness was a big problem in Caen and Le Havre, particularly amongst those who had returned home from being imprisoned or deported by the Nazis. The Secours Quaker delegations in these areas worked with other organisations to support their work and created their own temporary shelter by repairing a damaged house.

== Work in Germany ==
The most extensive operations of FRS overseas took place in Germany. There were an estimated 60 million people in Europe that had been displaced by fighting, governmental policies on ethnicity and forced labour migration. In 1945 large proportion of these people were in living in Germany and needed a lot of support in repatriation or resettlement. There were also many German civilians in need of relief.

=== Work with Displaced People ===
The FRS teams cleaned and repaired buildings, doing their best to source the necessary materials, which were scarce. They attempted to keep camps for displaced people clean and hygienic, and to fairly distribute food. They recruited displaced people living in the camps to take on these organisational roles, encouraging autonomy, and supported efforts to create workshops and other employment.

Many displaced people from Poland and Ukraine were unwilling to return home, as they feared the Soviet and Tito regimes. Several emigration schemes were introduced by other countries, and FRS team members began to support those applying with their arrangements, including providing information on their destination and language instruction.

There remained a group of displaced people, mainly older people and mothers with small children, who were not eligible for any of the emigration schemes, and who would be remaining in Germany. FRS workers looked for opportunities to integrate them into German life, running international clubs where the children and young people could get to know each other.

=== Work of individual FRS teams ===
==== FRS 100 ====
Led by Lilian Impey, this team left England in February 1945 and had spent two months working in Belgium when it was asked to go to Belsen concentration camp. They entered the camp on the 21st of April, 6 days after it had been liberated by British soldiers. Several members of the team stated that the conditions they found there challenged their belief in pacifism.

The men of the team worked on first aid, transport, water purification and drain repair whilst the women took charge of improvised hospital blocks. Many of those who had been imprisoned in the camp had typhus, while all were starving but struggled to eat normal food after not eating for so long. A total of 13,000 liberated prisoners died in the weeks following the relief team's arrival. As more doctors and nurses arrived, the FRS workers moved to organising clothing distribution, and helping internees, particularly unaccompanied children, to plan for the future.

After five weeks, FRS 100 was moved to Sulingen, and from there to the Braunschweig area, where they remained for three years, assisting with the care of around 17,500 displaced people. A subsection of the team took over work in Goslar when FRS 124 were moved in 1947.

==== FRS 124 ====
Led by Yvonne Marrack, this team was initially posted to a rest centre for displaced people in Holland. In July 1945, it was sent to Goslar and began work in 13 camps for displaced people. In the summer of 1947, they moved to the Schleswig area, where they ran a domestic science school for girls.

==== FRS 125 ====
Led by Michael Lee, this team was stationed first in Langendreer, then at Wattenscheid, primarily working with foreign workers. It was then moved to Cologne at the end of 1945 to work with German civilians.

==== FRS 151 ====
This team was sent to Oldenburg to work with refugees.

== Work in Greece ==
The work in Greece was of a somewhat scattered nature, falling into three main sections.

Sydney and Joice NanKivell Loch, based in Thessaloniki, ran multiple schemes with the aim of raising the standard of living in local villages, which had been heavily impacted by the Axis occupation and the beginnings of the Greek Civil War. This included running a farm school, distributing livestock, running summer camps, establishing a girls' school and founding a maternity hospital that offered training in midwifery.

An FRS team led by John Saunders worked on refugee transport and resettlement in the Aegean Islands. Many villages in the area had taken significant damage in the fighting, and those returning required help in finding accommodation and ways to support themselves.

A second FRS team, led by Norman Gilbertson, travelled to Thessaloniki in January 1946 and was attached to the United Nations Relief and Rehabilitation Administration unit there. They distributed supplies to the villages and supported the care of children, particularly orphans.

== Work in Poland and with Polish refugees ==
Poland was the site of significant Quaker relief work following the First World War. After the German invasion in 1939, the Friends Service Council sent a joint delegation with the Polish Relief Fund to help Polish refugees in Hungary and Romania. The Quaker workers concentrated on finding educational and work opportunities for the refugees.

As the war progressed a number of these refugees moved first to Cyprus, and then to Palestine, accompanied by Joice and Sydney Loch, a couple who had been aid-workers for Quaker relief organisations since the First World War. Other Polish refugees travelled to Eastern Africa. This work came under the umbrella of the FRS in 1943. The Lochs and other workers continued to support education and work opportunities, encouraging the refugees to take on leadership roles and to start schools and clubs. They also liaised with local officials and supported future planning. This work was largely wound down in 1946, with many of the workers involved going next to Poland.

Poland's agriculture and medical facilities had been devastated by the war. It was decided that the FRS and the American Friends Service Council (AFSC) would form an Anglo American Quaker relief mission based in Warsaw. They distributed supplementary rations to children under the age of 7, who were not supported by school-based schemes. At its peak this feeding programme was distributing food to 11,000 children from 31 centres. The mission also distributed clothing, transported building materials for rebuilding efforts and set up a clinic.

An important part of the work was promoting reconciliation amongst the different ethnic and religious groups in Poland, most particularly between those of German heritage and those of Slavic heritage. It wasn't possible to do this directly, but it was ensured that all organisational committees had representatives from each relevant group, encouraging dialogue and cooperation. The teams also put on multi-lingual nativity plays, ensuring children from all groups had parts, and set up sewing groups, which provided employment as well as opportunities for dialogue.

The mission withdrew in May 1949.

== Work in Austria ==
The situation in post-war Austria was complicated, with a multitude of different jurisdictions and authorities. It was decided that FRS workers would be sent to work under the British Red Cross. Food was a dire problem, with the average rations being around 1000 calories per day in 1945/46. FRS began with a feeding scheme for older people working at Vienna University and for infant children. They also distributed clothing and ran a hostel for students.

Richard Rowntree, a former FAU member who transferred to FRS, ran the Distressed Persons Scheme. Austrians who had near relatives in Britain were entitled to get visas to join them. Rowntree helped all those accessing this scheme to arrange travel and transit visas, and co-ordinated with the FCRA in London who would meet them on arrival.

== People associated with the Friends Relief Service ==
- Charlotte Adeney (illustrator)
- Horace Gundry Alexander
- Mosa Anderson
- Bertha Bracey
- Aubrey Brocklehurst (horologist)
- Wilfred Brown (tenor)
- Charles Frederick Carter
- Nancy Catford (sculptor)
- Corder Catchpool
- Kanty Cooper (sculptor)
- Gerontissa Gavrielia
- Alastair Heron
- Lettice Jowitt
- Margaret McNeil
- Richard Stanley Peters
- Edith Pye
- Tessa Rowntree
- Cedric Smith (statistician)
- Hannah Stanton
- Roger Harold Metford Warner
- Peter Willmott (sociologist)
- Francesca Wilson

== Archives and Records ==
The archives of the Friends Relief Service are held at the Library of the Society of Friends, Friends House, London.
