= Charles Frederick Carter =

British economist (1919–2002)

Carter in 1963.

Sir Charles Frederick Carter FBA (15 August 1919 – 27 June 2002) was an English academic known primarily for his role as the founding Vice-Chancellor of Lancaster University.

== Early life ==
Carter was born on 15 August 1919, in Rugby, Warwickshire, to a father who was an electrical engineer and the developer of the brushed DC electric motor, and a mother who was an active member of the Society of Friends. He lived in Long Itchington.

He was educated at Lawrence Sheriff School, Rugby School and St John's College, Cambridge, where he read Mathematics and Economics and attained a First. His brother Geoffrey was a Professor of Engineering, who attended the same school.

== Career ==
During World War II, Carter refused to fight, being a conscientious objector, and because he refused to accept any conditions for his exemption he spent three months in Strangeways Prison, Manchester. When released, he joined the Friends' Relief Service, where he met Janet Shea, whom he married in 1944.

In 1945, he returned to Cambridge, where he became a lecturer in statistics and, from 1947, a fellow of Emmanuel College, Cambridge. He remained at Cambridge until 1952, when he took the Chair of Applied Economics at Queen's University, Belfast. Whilst in Northern Ireland he became a student of The Troubles, and concluded that a Protestant monopoly on power was unacceptable and could not be sustained. He also chaired the Northern Ireland Economic Development Council. In 1959 he moved to the Stanley Jevons chair in Manchester, remaining there for four years.

As an economist, he was a follower of G.L.S. Shackle, and was concerned about the impact of expectations in human decisions.

In 1963, he became the founding Vice-Chancellor of the new University of Lancaster. He managed to admit the first 264 students in 1964, a year ahead of schedule, by utilising disused buildings as temporary accommodation and teaching facilities. Carter's vision was for Lancaster to be a university for the whole North West, commenting that the people of Lancashire thought of it as their university. He refused "discrimination on the grounds of race, colour, politics or any other thing" and established links with various Higher Education Colleges, thus pre-empting the drive for widening participation forty years later.

== Personal life ==
His tenure at the University of Lancaster ended in 1979, the same year he was knighted. He retired to Seascale, Cumbria, and continued to work on projects he deemed to be worthwhile.

== Works ==
- Carter, C. F. (1950). "Expectations in economics". Economic Journal. 60 (237): 92–105. doi:10.2307/2227211. JSTOR 2227211.
- Carter, C. F. (1953). "A revised theory of expectations". Economic Journal. 63 (252): 811–820. doi:10.2307/2226641. JSTOR 2226641.
- Carter, C. F. (1956). "Review of uncertainty in economics and other reflections, by G. L. Shackle". Economic Journal. 66: 700–701. doi:10.2307/2227525. JSTOR 2227525.
- Carter, C. F. (1963). The science of wealth: an elementary textbook of economics. London: Edward Arnold Publ. Ltd.
- Carter, C. F.; Ford, J. L. (1972). Uncertainty and expectations in economics: essays in honour of G.L.S. Shackle. Oxford: Blackwell. ISBN 9780631141709.

Academic offices
Preceded by None	Vice-Chancellors of Lancaster University; 1964–1979	Succeeded by Philip Reynolds
Professional and academic associations
Preceded by Sir Bruce Williams	President of the Manchester Statistical Society; 1967–69	Succeeded by Lord Bowden
