= Richard Stanley Peters =

British philosopher

- Born: 31 October 1919; Mussoorie, British Raj
- Died: 30 December 2011 (aged 92); London, UK
- Scientific career
- Fields: Philosophy
- Workplaces: Birkbeck College; Harvard University; Australian National University; University of London

Richard Stanley Peters (31 October 1919 – 30 December 2011) was an English philosopher. His work belongs mainly to the areas of political theory, philosophical psychology, and philosophy of education.

== Early life ==
Peters was born in 1919 in Mussoorie, India. He spent his childhood with his grandmother in England. He was a pupil at Sidcot School, Winscombe, Somerset, 1933–1938. As a young man, his private tutor was Eric Blair (the writer George Orwell). As a conscientious objector in the Second World War, he served in the Friends Ambulance Unit and with the Friends Relief Service in 1940–1944.

From his marriage in 1942 to Margaret Lee Duncan (1917–1998), elementary school teacher and daughter of Alfred Duncan, engineer, came one son and two daughters.

== Academic career ==
Peters studied at The Queen's College, Oxford, and received the Bachelor of Arts in 1942. In 1944 he began teaching Latin at Sidcot School. He became a part-time lecturer at Birkbeck College, University of London, where he also studied philosophy and psychology, receiving his PhD in 1949. From then to 1958 he was a full-time lecturer, moving on to be a reader in philosophy until 1962. In 1961 he had a one-year guest professorship for education at Harvard University. In the following year he went to Australian National University. From 1962 until retirement in 1983, Peters was Professor of the Philosophy of Education at the Institute of Education (founded 1947) University of London. In 1971 he was Dean of the Institute. Under his guidance the Institute grew fast and considerably influenced the development of the philosophy of education in England. At the Institute Peters collaborated with Paul H. Hirst, who later became Professor of Education at King's College, London, and then professor at University of Cambridge.

== Influence on the philosophy of education ==
Peters is known particularly for his work in the philosophy of education. However, his early writings were occupied with psychology, more exactly with a philosophical view of psychological issues. Thus his research was in the areas motivation, emotions, personality as well as social behaviour and the relationship between reason and longing.

Perhaps the most important work by Peters is Ethics and Education. With this and his subsequent publications he significantly influenced the development of the philosophy of education in Britain and worldwide. The influence resulted from his examination of the concept of education in the sense of analytic philosophy, a central tool being term analysis. Peters explored two substantial aspects of the philosophy of education: the normative and the cognitive.

== Works ==
All were published in London except where stated otherwise.

- R. S. Peters: Hobbes, Harmondsworth, Middlesex: Penguin, 1956.
- R. S. Peters: The Concept of Motivation, Routledge & Kegan Paul, 1958
- R. S. Peters: "Education as initiation", 1964, in R. D. Archambault, ed.: Philosophical analysis and education, Routledge & Kegan Paul, 1965, pp. 87–111
- R. S. Peters: Ethics and education. 5th e, George Allen & Unwin Ltd, 1968. In German: R. S. Peters: "Ethik und Erziehung". In: W. Loch, H. Paschen and G. Priesemann, eds: Sprache und Lernen. Internationale Studien zur pädagogischen Anthropologie, Band 19, Düsseldorf, 1972
- R. S. Peters: "The philosophy of education", 1966, in J. W. Tibble, ed.: The Study of Education, Routledge & Kegan Paul, 1966, pp. 59–89
- R. S. Peters: "What is an educational process?", 1967, in R. S. Peters, ed.: The Concept of Education, Routledge & Kegan Paul, 1967, pp. 1–23
- R. S. Peters: "Michael Oakeshott's philosophy of education", 1968, in R. S. Peters: Essays on Educators, George Allen & Unwin, London, 1981, pp. 89–109
- R. S. Peters and P. H. Hirst: The Logic of Education. 2nd ed., Routledge & Kegan Paul, 1971, In German: P. H. Hirst and R. S. Peters: Die Begründung der Erziehung durch die Vernunft, in W. Loch, H. Paschen and G. Priesemann, eds: Sprache und Lernen. Internationale Studien zur pädagogischen Anthropologie, Band 18, Düsseldorf, 1972
- R. F. Dearden, P. H. Hirst and R. S. Peters, eds: Education and the Development of Reason, Routledge & Kegan Paul, 1972
- R. S. Peters, ed.: The Philosophy of Education, Oxford University Press, 1973
- R. S. Peters: Psychology and Ethical Development. A collection of articles on psychological theories, ethical development and human understanding, George Allen & Unwin, 1974
- R. S. Peters: Education and the Education of Teachers, Routledge & Kegan Paul, 1977
- R. S. Peters, ed., John Dewey Reconsidered, (London: Routledge & Kegan Paul, 1977)
- R. S. Peters: Moral Development and Moral Education, George Allen & Unwin, 1981
- R. S. Peters: "Philosophy of education". In P. H. Hirst, ed.: Educational theory and its foundation disciplines. Routledge & Kegan Paul, 1983, pp. 30–61

== Sources ==
- D. E. Cooper, ed.: Education, Values and Mind. Essays for R. S. Peters, London/Boston/Henley, 1986
- J. Earwaker: "R. S. Peters and the Concept of Education", in Journal of Philosophy of Education Society of Great Britain, Vol. 7, 1973, pp. 239–259
- P. Enslin: "Are Hirst and Peters Liberal Philosophers of Education?" in Journal of Philosophy of Education Society of Great Britain, Vol. 19, 1985, pp. 211–222
- J. W. Steutel: "Konzepte und Konzeptionen. Zum Problem einer analytischen Erziehungsphilosophie", in Zeitschrift für Pädagogik. Band 37, 1991, pp. 81–96
- J. Steutel and B. Spiecker: "R. S. Peters und P. H. Hirsts Analyse von Education in Hinblick auf eine Bildungstheorie", in O. Hansmann, ed.: Diskurs Bildungstheorie II. Problemgeschichtliche Orientierungen, Weinheim 1989, pp. 508–536
