= Joice NanKivell Loch =

Australian writer, humanitarian and philanthropist

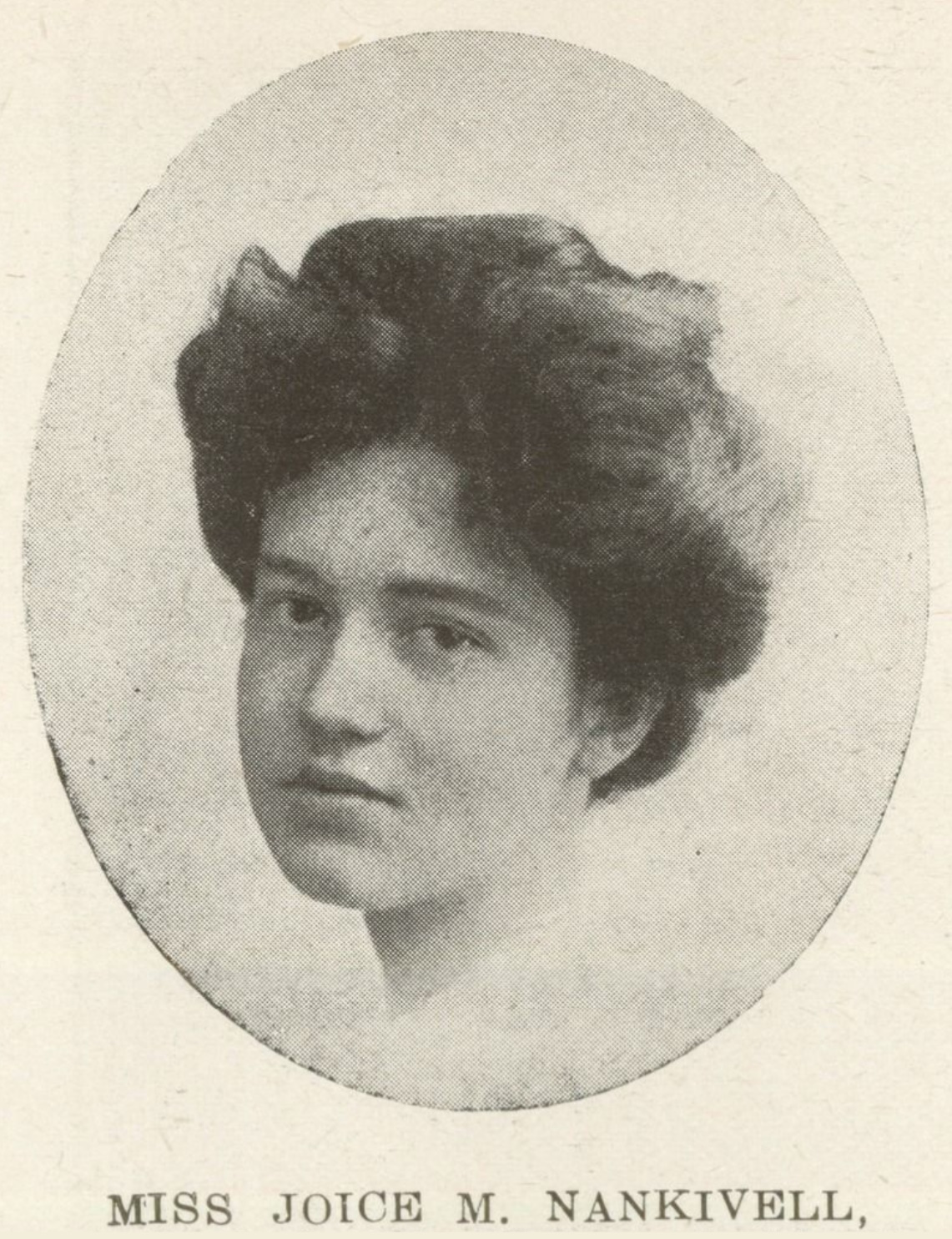
- Portrait of Joice NanKivell (published in 1917).
- Born: Joice Mary NanKivell; 24 January 1887; Ingham, Queensland
- Died: 8 October 1982 (aged 95); Ouranoupoli, Greece
- Occupations: author, journalist, humanitarian worker
- Spouse: Frederick Sydney Loch

Joice NanKivell Loch MBE (24 January 1887 – 8 October 1982) was an Australian author, journalist and humanitarian worker who worked with refugees in Poland, Greece and Romania in the 1920s and during World War II.

Joice NanKivell was raised in rural Queensland and Victoria and developed her talent as a writer while living and working on family farms. During World War I she lived in Melbourne, where she worked as a writer of articles, reviews, poetry and several books. Joice married the writer Sydney Loch in February 1919, after which the couple travelled to London. Joice and Sydney Loch spent eighteen months in Dublin, researching a book about the struggle for Irish independence. In 1922 and 1923 the couple worked with Quaker organisations in war-torn Poland, providing assistance and humanitarian aid to refugees and villagers in communities devastated by war and famine. In late 1923 the Lochs relocated to Greece, living and working at the American Farm School near Thessaloniki, delivering aid and assisting in the re-settlement of Greek Orthodox refugees from Asia Minor.

On a camping holiday in 1925 the Lochs visited the province of Chalkidiki in north-eastern Greece, during which Sydney was taken on a tour of the monastic community on the Athos peninsula. He received a contract to write an illustrated book on the Mount Athos monasteries, after which the couple regularly visited the area, camping at the nearby village of Pyrgos (modern-day Ouranoupoli), a community of refugees from Turkey. In 1928 Joice and Sydney Loch relocated to Pyrgos and made their home in an old Byzantine tower on the seafront. Joice became involved in the life of the community, holding regular health clinics and establishing a women's rug-weaving co-operative to produce premium hand-woven and naturally-dyed floor coverings, with distinctly Greek designs and motifs, for sale to affluent Greeks and foreigners.

During the early months of World War II the Lochs were responsible for the delivery of humanitarian aid from Quaker organisations to Polish refugees in neutral Romania. By September 1940 the political situation in Romania had become unstable, with pro-Nazi politicians and paramilitary forces becoming prominent in the country. The Lochs organised several mass escapes of Polish and Jewish refugees from Romania, across the Black Sea to Turkey, and onward to Brish-controlled Cyprus and Palestine, with Joice herself in charge of hundreds of refugee women and children. In the last years of the war the Lochs were responsible for the welfare of the large group of Polish refugees in camps near Tel-Aviv in Palestine.

After the withdrawal of Axis troops the Lochs returned to Greece, initially living at the American Farm School during the civil war between a Communist insurgency and government forces. By the end of the civil war in 1949 the couple returned to Ouranoupoli and re-established their home in the Byzantine tower. After her husband's death in 1954, Joice continued to live at Ouranoupoli, writing, occasionally travelling and engaging in the life of the village. She died there in 1982, leaving behind a legacy characterised by compassion and commitment to social justice and the welfare of vulnerable populations. Joice Loch's career included significant contributions as a writer in the form of articles and books that highlighted the plight of refugees and social conditions in Europe. Throughout her life, Loch maintained her Australian identity while becoming a significant voice in humanitarian discourse globally.

== Biography ==
=== Early years ===
Joice Mary NanKivell was born on 24 January 1887 at the 'Farnham' sugar cane plantation on the Herbert River, near Ingham in far north Queensland, the eldest child of George Griffiths NanKivell and Edith Ada (née Lawson). The 'Farnham' plantation was managed by Joice's father and owned by Fanning, NanKivell and Company, of which her wealthy grandfather Thomas NanKivell was a partner. Joice had a younger brother born in October 1888, Charles George NanKivell, who was known by family members as 'Geoffrey'.

Joice NanKivell and her younger brother were born at a time of uncertainty in the north Queensland sugar industry, brought about by government efforts to control and restrict the employment of indentured non-European labourers, most of them native to various Pacific islands, collectively known as Kanakas. The Pacific Islanders Labourers Act had been passed by the Queensland colonial government in 1880 to regulate the indentured labour trade from the Pacific islands to work in tropical Queensland. An amendment to the legislation passed in 1884 sought to limit the employment of Kanaka labourers, with a proposal to phase out 'non-white' recruitment by December 1890. This decision came under sustained pressure from plantation owners and business interests favouring the continuation of the Pacific islands labour trade. In February 1892 the Queensland Chief Secretary, Samuel Griffith, issued a manifesto declaring a temporary "resumption of Polynesian immigration... for a definite but limited period of, say, ten years".

Despite the temporary reversal of government policy the sugar industry had begun to suffer from labour shortages, excerbated by the mounting opposition from the labour movement in Queensland to the recruitment of Kanaka workers. Amidst these disruptions it was discovered that the 'Farnham' plantation had been heavily mortgaged by Thomas NanKivell. During the banking crisis that began in early 1893 the bank took possession of the plantation in settlement of the outstanding mortgage payments, resulting in George NanKivell and his family walking off the property.

George NanKivell's initial response to his change in circumstances was to send his wife and children to live with family members while he travelled to the goldfields of Western Australia, then undergoing rapid development after significant gold discoveries at Coolgardie and Kalgoorlie. However his efforts to find significant amounts of gold were unsuccessful and his initial optimism "was worn down by disappointment", eventually returning empty-handed to his wife and children in Melbourne.

=== Rural Victoria ===
George NanKivell accepted the job of manager of his uncle's sheep property near Boolarra, in the Latrobe Valley in the Gippsland district of Victoria. The family moved onto the property, into a rudimentary wooden house with dirt floors. George NanKivell and his brother Jack spent several years working on the pastoral property at Boolarra, during which George's wife Edith and her children spent considerable periods living in the household of Edith's older sister in Ipswich, Queensland, to escape the primitive conditions on the farm.

During one of the periods when Edith NanKivell was in Queensland George's uncle sold the Boolarra property and George once again went off to the Kalgoorlie goldfields. On this occasion he became severely ill after succumbing to typhoid fever. George's uncle then purchased a farm in the Myrrhee valley, south-east of Benalla in the Wangaratta district of north-east Victoria, and offered George NanKivell the job of managing it. Once again the family were reduced to living in primitive conditions, in a small three-roomed house with dirt floors. The property was in rough, dry country infested with rabbits.

Joice NanKivell received her education from her parents and, for a short time, from a governess at a neighbouring station. In her teenage years she wrote verses, with some of them accepted for publication in Victorian newspapers and journals including The Everylady.

When George NanKivell heard of a property for sale near Drouin, in the West Gippsland region east of Melbourne, he borrowed money from his wife's uncle for a deposit. The property included a cherry orchard and a house with running water and an indoor toilet. In 1906 NanKivell sold the property at Drouin and moved to the Neerim district, 17 miles (27 km) north of Drouin, on a dairy farm of forty acres. In 1908 he purchased the farm, plus an additional fifteen acres, "under the closer settlement scheme".

Joice NanKivell continued to live with her family into her mid-twenties, to assist her mother in running the household and, at the insistence of her father, to provide labour on the farm. While living in the Drouin district Joice completed a children's book which she called The Cobweb Ladder and sent the manuscript to the Lothian Book Publishing Company in Melbourne. The company accepted the manuscript and decided to publish the story in large format with full-page black-and-white illustrations by Edith Alsop. Lothian were confident that Joice's book would be a success for the Christmas children's market in both Australia and Britain. After The Cobweb Ladder was accepted for publication, followed by one of her poems being accepted by Contrast, a Melbourne literary magazine, Joice began to dream of leaving her life on the farm and becoming a writer and travel to Europe. However, the onset of war in 1914 brought paper rationing and the publication of The Cobweb Ladder was postponed.

=== Melbourne ===
In 1914 Joice NanKivell, aged twenty-six, successfully applied for a part-time position as secretary to Alexander Leeper, a classical scholar and warden of Trinity College at the University of Melbourne. Joice found lodgings in an East Melbourne boarding house. Her work hours were flexible and Leeper encouraged her writing and enabled her to attend university lectures that interested her. NanKivell had some her poetry published in the The Herald, an evening newspaper in Melbourne, and its literary editor, Guy Innes, commissioned her to write a weekly book review column.

After the outbreak of World War I Joice's brother Geoffrey enlisted in the Australian Imperial Force and was placed in the 4th Battalion, Australian Infantry. He served at Gallipoli during 1915 after which he was transferred to the Western Front.^{[A]}

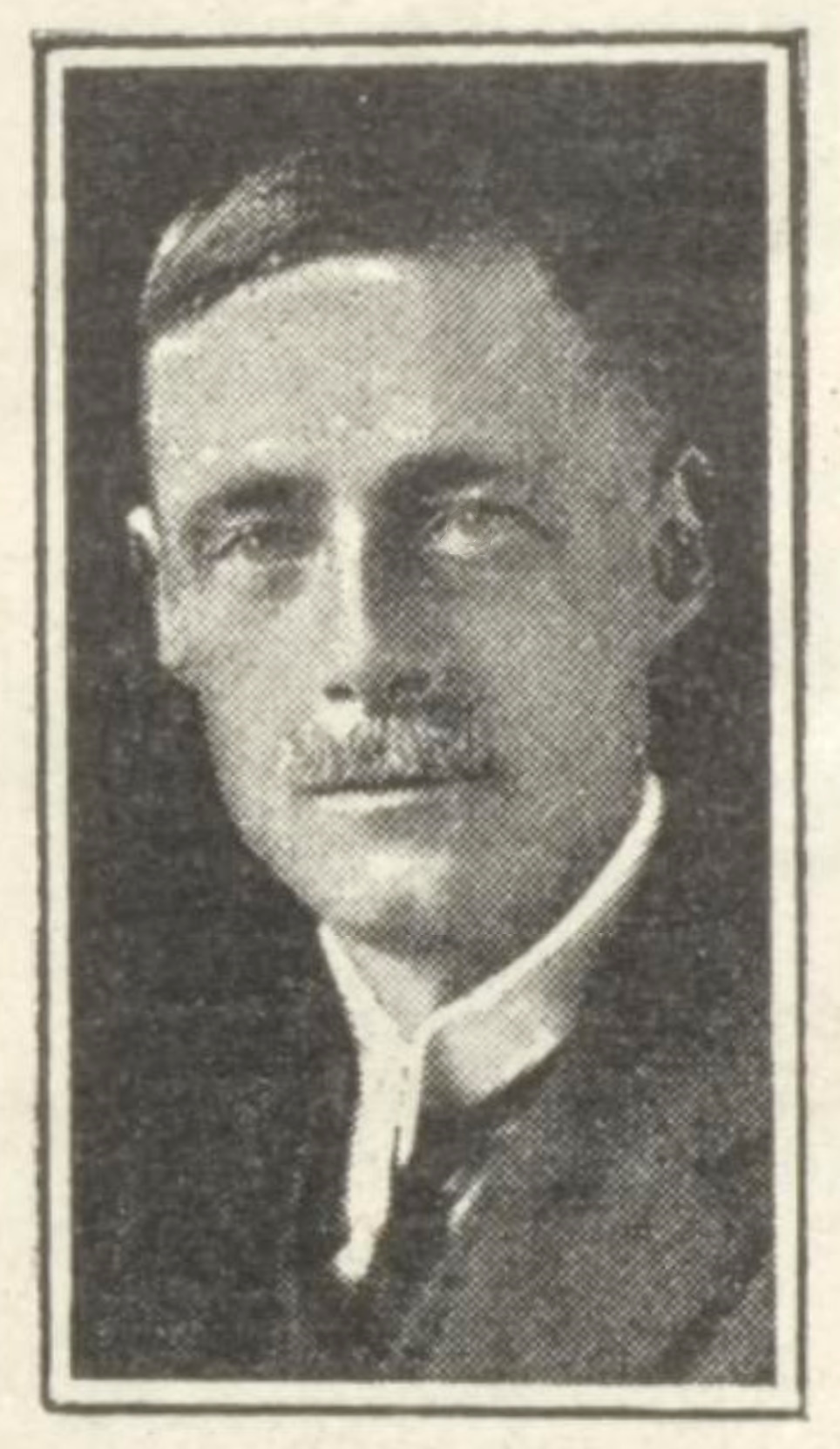
Photograph of Sydney Loch, published in The Bulletin, 2 August 1917.

In late July 1916 Joice NanKivell reviewed The Straits Impregnable by Sydney de Loghe, a first-person account of the Gallipoli campaign published by the Australasian Authors' Agency. Joice was so intrigued by the description of a soldier's experience, in a campaign in which her brother had fought, that she arranged to meet the author, Sydney Loch, with whom she discovered an affinity.^{[B]}

In early September 1916 the NanKivell family received the news that Joice's brother Geoffrey had been killed in action in northern France, during the first weeks of the Battle of Pozières. Joice was granted compassionate leave by Leeper and spent four months at Neerim, supporting her mother emotionally and the day-to-day housekeeping. After returning to Melbourne and her job at the University, Joice began writing her second book, a collection of short stories dedicated to her brother, about Joice and Geoffrey's childhood experiences in Queensland and Victoria.

Joice NanKivell's The Cobweb Ladder was eventually published in September 1916, printed in Britain instead of Australia. Two thousand copies were sold in Britain, America and Canada and a further two thousand copies were shipped to Australia for the Christmas market. However, with wartime austerity and recession in Australia, and competition from Annie Rentoul's Elves and Fairies, the sales of The Cobweb Ladder were less than had been expected.

Joice NanKivell and Sydney Loch continued to see each other during the following years and their relationship slowly developed into one of a romantic nature. The first edition of Loch's The Straits Impregnable sold out in three weeks and a second edition was published, but the book was subject to censorship and withdrawn from bookshops by order of military authorities who were concerned that the book's popularity and its candid and realistic account of battlefield conditions would adversely affect recruitment efforts.

In 1917 verses written by NanKivell were occasionally published in the 'Under the Clocks' column of Melbourne's The Herald newspaper. Sydney Loch's novel Pelican Pool: A Novel was published (under the name 'Sydney de Loghe') in November 1917 by Angus and Robertson, though the book was received with mixed reviews. Joice NanKivell's book of short stories of her childhood experiences and dedicated to her late brother, The Solitary Pedestrian: A Book of Sketches, was published in late 1918 as the war in Europe was coming to an end. Joice had saved enough money to travel to London and she and Sydney planned to marry and travel overseas together after the war ended.

Joice NanKivell and Sydney Loch were married "in a quiet ceremony" on 22 February 1919 at the Scots Presbyterian Church in Melbourne. Joice's father disapproved of the marriage and refused to attend (and also forbade his wife to attend). Joice then set about booking a passage to England. Guy Innes guaranteed some income after her arrival in London by approving her appointment as a correspondent for The Herald. She managed to find a berth on the transport vessel S.S. Orca, which had arrived in Australia in late March 1919 with troops returning from the war. Sydney was unable to accompany his wife and planned to get a later passage to England.

=== Ireland ===
Joice Loch arrived in London in May 1919 and stayed initially in a room at the Lyceum Club. When Sydney arrived several months later the couple spent a honeymoon in Europe and then rented an apartment near Hyde Park. Joice and Sydney Loch made plans to travel to Dublin to research and write a book about the struggle for Irish independence, amid the growing violence and turmoil following the election of a Sinn Féin parliamentary majority in 1918 and the subsequent guerrilla war against British occupation led by Michael Collins and the Irish Republican Army (IRA). The couple secured a contract from the John Murray publishing house to jointly write the book.

In about August 1920 Joice and Sydney Loch travelled to Dublin where Sydney Loch contacted an old school-friend who was a British Intelligence agent working undercover in Ireland (anonymised in Ireland in Travail as 'Major X'). The subsequent meetings with 'Major X' and his colleagues by the two writers was a potentially dangerous activity, with British agents and their informers, as well as British constables and soldiers, being regularly attacked and murdered by the IRA. The murders were being met by escalating retaliatory violence by the Black and Tans, British constables recruited into the Royal Irish Constabulary. The acts of brutality by both sides of the conflict was responsible for the tense and vindictive atmosphere of distrust and suspicion in the country.

After a short period in Dublin the Lochs, accompanied by a friend, undertook a tour of the West Coast in a hired automobile. After their return the Lochs moved into a boarding-house apartment in Ely Place. The couple met the writer George William Russell, through whom they made contact with members of Dublin's literary community. On 21 November 1920, in a co-ordinated IRA operation organised by Michael Collins, fourteen men were assassinated including a number of British Intelligence agents. As Joice met and became friendly with her landlady and neighbours, she discovered that the boarding-house where the couple were living was occasionally used to shelter IRA members overnight. One of the other apartments was occupied by Mabel FitzGerald and her young child, the wife and child of Desmond FitzGerald, a Sinn Féin member elected to the British parliament and the Minister for Publicity in the self-proclaimed first republican parliament (declared unlawful by the British administration).

During their residence at Ely Place the boarding house, including the Lochs' apartment, was subjected to several searches by the Black and Tans. On one occasion, after ammunition was found in the landlady's apartment, all males in the building, including Sydney, were taken away and imprisoned for a short period in Dublin Castle. In July 1921 'Major X' returned to England after disclosing to the Lochs that his undercover role had been discovered. He warned the writers that their position was precarious and they should consider leaving Britain before their manuscript about their Irish experiences was published. In December 1921 negotiations which led to the Anglo-Irish Treaty concluded in London between the British government and representatives of the Irish republican parliament. On the day that the treaty was signed Joice Loch was walking in St. Stephen's Green when a bomb was thrown by a disaffected republican, rendering her briefly unconscious and causing deaths and injuries to others in the park. In early January 1922 the Lochs were present at Mansion House in Dublin for the Dáil Éireann (the legislative assembly for the de facto Irish Republic), where they witnessed the vote to ratify the Anglo-Irish Treaty.

The Lochs, feeling as though they were held under suspicion not only by the British administration at Dublin Castle and the Black and Tans, but also by Sinn Féin and the IRA, returned to London soon after the vote in the Dáil, where they completed the account of their eighteen months in Ireland, detailing events in the Irish War of Independence and the last months of British 'home rule'.

=== The Quakers ===
In August 1922 the book Ireland in Travail, jointly written by Joice and Sydney Loch, was published in London. The publisher John Murray was pleased with the reception of the book and suggested the couple write a second joint book, taking the Soviet Union under Lenin as their subject. With the Russian project forefront in their minds, but lacking the means to travel to the Soviet Union until they received royalties from their Ireland book, the Lochs left London to visit Joice's cousins, the Rogers family, in Cornwall. The couple were taken to visit a friend of Mrs. Rogers, an elderly Quaker lady named Hitchens, who suggested they might consider volunteering to work in Russia for the Quaker Famine Relief organisation. The suggestion was conveyed to Ruth Fry who was directing the work of Quaker Famine Relief units in Poland and Russia. The Lochs attended an interview with Fry, who decided the couple were not suitable to work as volunteers in the Quaker relief activities in Russia. In the following weeks, however, Fry began to consider the value that the Lochs, as writers, could bring to assist in raising funds with articles about Quaker-funded missions and refugee camps. The Quaker missions in Poland were severely under-funded, despite fund-raising efforts by the Friends War Relief in Britain and America, and many of the volunteers had been ravaged by typhus, dysentery and malaria. The new Polish Republic was almost bankrupt and over a million formerly-displaced Polish refugees were suffering from famine and disease. At a second interview Ruth Fry proposed that the Quakers pay for the Lochs' fares to Poland and provide bed and board if they would work as volunteers with Polish refugees and write about the crisis for the British newspapers. The couple would be working in eastern Poland, near the extensive Pripet Marshes, where malaria was a widespread threat. The farmland in eastern Poland had been devastated during the war under Lenin's 'scorched earth' policy and basic foodstuffs were only obtainable under black market prices. Over ten thousand Polish refugees were returning each week from Siberia, the Volga Basin and Belarus to find their villages destroyed and their livestock and farm equipment gone. The Quaker War Relief Committee had established five refugee aid centres, four in eastern Poland and one in Galicia, to feed the returning refugees and help to establish them on their farms.

The Lochs agreed to the terms that the Quakers were offering. They secured a contract and a small advance from the publishers Allen and Unwin to write a book about war-torn Poland. Before their departure the couple were provided with uniforms, insisted upon by the Quakers for their volunteers to wear. For Joice it was a grey suit, thick grey cotton stockings and a hat. Joice and Sydney Loch then departed from London, travelling by rail to Warsaw.

=== Poland and Russia ===
In Warsaw the Lochs met with Florence Barrow, the head of Friends Relief in Poland. Taking advantage of Sydney's experience with horses in Australia, he was given charge of a program in which horses, obtained from the Polish Army, were being loaned or purchased to peasants to plough their land. He was put in charge of a small command post in the Stochid River valley to implement his horse-and-plough scheme. Joice was sent for a month to the de-lousing station and quarantine camp at Powalski, to write about conditions there. During the autumn of 1922 the Lochs began working at the refugee aid centre at the village of Powursk, allocating food, clothing and medical assistance to an area south and west of the Pripyat River and its marshes and tributary, the Stochid River. Joice accompanied the celebrated Australian polar explorer, Hubert Wilkins, who visited the region to film a documentary about the Friends humanitarian activities in Poland.

Joice Loch's numerous articles and press releases from Poland were initially rejected for publication, though stories pleading for support for starving children in Russia had been appearing regularly in British newspapers. Before the end of 1922, however, Joice's feature article, accompanied by photographs, about starving Polish war victims and their children living in water-logged wartime dugouts was published in the British press, stimulating interest in the work of the Quakers in Poland. In December 1922 a goods train filled with chocolate bars, donated second-hand clothing, dolls and toys was able to be sent to Poland. By the onset of winter Joice had handed over the "thankless task" of writing of press releases to an American journalist in order to take a more active role of administering famine relief and assisting with medical and nursing procedures.

Joice discovered she was pregnant, but lost the baby by miscarriage, after which the Lochs were granted compassionate leave. They opted for a "brief working holiday" in Russia after the Quaker Famine Relief in Moscow obtained visas for them to enter the country. They travelled by train from Warsaw to Moscow and were accommodated in a large house in central Moscow used as a hostel for Quaker volunteers. In her later writings about communist Russia Joice Loch maintained "a strong sense of reality and described the good with the bad", unlike many foreign writers visiting Russia at that time who were "lavishly entertained by the Communists". After a few weeks in Moscow the Lochs visited the Friends Famine Relief mission in the village of Buzuluk, near the port of Samara on the Volga River, travelling there by a three-day train journey on the Moscow-Siberia line.

After Joice and Sydney Loch returned to Warsaw in the spring of 1923, along with other key members of the famine relief teams they were each awarded with the Polish Gold Cross of Merit, presented by the acting president, Marshal Piłsudski. During the first half of 1923 the Polish government took over many of the welfare organisations that had been established by the Society of Friends, after which only a few volunteers remained in Poland, including the Lochs. For six months Sydney was involved in setting up a Farm School for orphaned children near Brest-Litovsk. During the initial period Joice was staying at the Friends Women's Hostel in Warsaw intending to assist as a medical orderly, but at a meeting in Warsaw addressed by Dr. Hilda Clark, head of the Quaker mission in Vienna, she was inspired to volunteer to assist the Greek Orthodox refugees being driven from Turkey in the aftermath of the ill-fated Greek incursion to the Turkish mainland at Smyrna in 1919. While Sydney Loch remained in Poland to complete his work at Brest-Litovsk, in May 1923 Joice travelled by train from Warsaw to northern Greece to the huge refugee camp set up on the grounds of the Quaker-run American Farm School near Thessaloniki.^{[C]}

=== Greece ===
After Sydney Loch returned from Poland and joined his wife at the American Farm School, the couple worked there for the next two years, Sydney as a teacher and Joice as a medical orderly and part-time journalist. During this period the educational institution near Thessaloniki was involved in the re-settlement of Greek refugees from Asia Minor.

In 1924 Joice and Sydney Loch were awarded the Order of St. Sava medals by the King of Serbia for their work on mosquito eradication programs for the control of malaria.

During the summer of 1925 Joice and Sydney Loch, with four other friends from the American Farm School, set out on a camping holiday to the province of Chalkidiki in north-eastern Greece, in the vicinity of the Athos peninsula, a two-day journey from Thessaloniki, taking with them a small collapsible boat. They camped on the island of Ammouliani, opposite the refugee settlement of Pyrgos (modern-day Ouranoupoli) at the neck of the peninsula. During their stay Sydney was taken on a guided tour of several monasteries on the Athos peninsula and permitted to stay overnight. He became fascinated by the monastic community where women were prohibited by Greek law and religious tradition. Later that summer the Lochs revisited the area, on this occasion camping on the beach near the Byzantine watchtower, built in the tenth century, on the shoreline at Pyrgos. From their base at Pyrgos, Sydney visited the monasteries on the Athos peninsula and was permitted to take photographs. After returning to Thessaloniki he sent a selection of his photographs and a synopsis of a proposed book about Athos to several British publishers. Sydney Loch was contracted to write an illustrated book on Mount Athos by The Lutterworth Press. The couple returned to Pyrgos, from where Sydney undertook research by visiting the monasteries on the peninsula and Joice worked on her Russian spy novel, The Fourteen Thumbs of St. Peter.^{[D]}

The village of Pyrgos had been established on land confiscated in 1922 from the Vatopedi Monastery in order to settle refugees from Asia Minor, with the first arrivals moving into abandoned monastic buildings until the first houses were built. After three years many of the villagers had only recently arrived at the settlement after spending years in refugee camps near Thessaloniki and the village still had rudimentary facilities, with no medical facilities or community sanitation services. Joice Loch began to be involved in the life of the village, offering her much-needed nursing and medical experience. During this period the Lochs camped in the courtyard of the watchtower by the shoreline, which had a well for water. By 1926 most of the refugee camps in Greece were almost empty and the Friends War Victims Relief at the American Farm School near Thessaloniki was being wound down. The Lochs returned to the Farm School and continued to work there until the last of the refugees had passed through the camp and been re-housed. In 1926 Joice was the first foreign woman honoured with the Order of the Phoenix (for "outstanding Greeks and foreigners"), awarded by the Greek government. In 1928 Sydney briefly revisited Poland on behalf of the Quakers, after which he and Joice returned to Pyrgos where they were informed that the Governor of Macedonia, who had recently carried out an inspection of the area, had agreed for the Lochs to live in the old Byzantine tower in exchange for a token rent and an undertaking to carry out certain structural repairs.

=== Pyrgos village ===
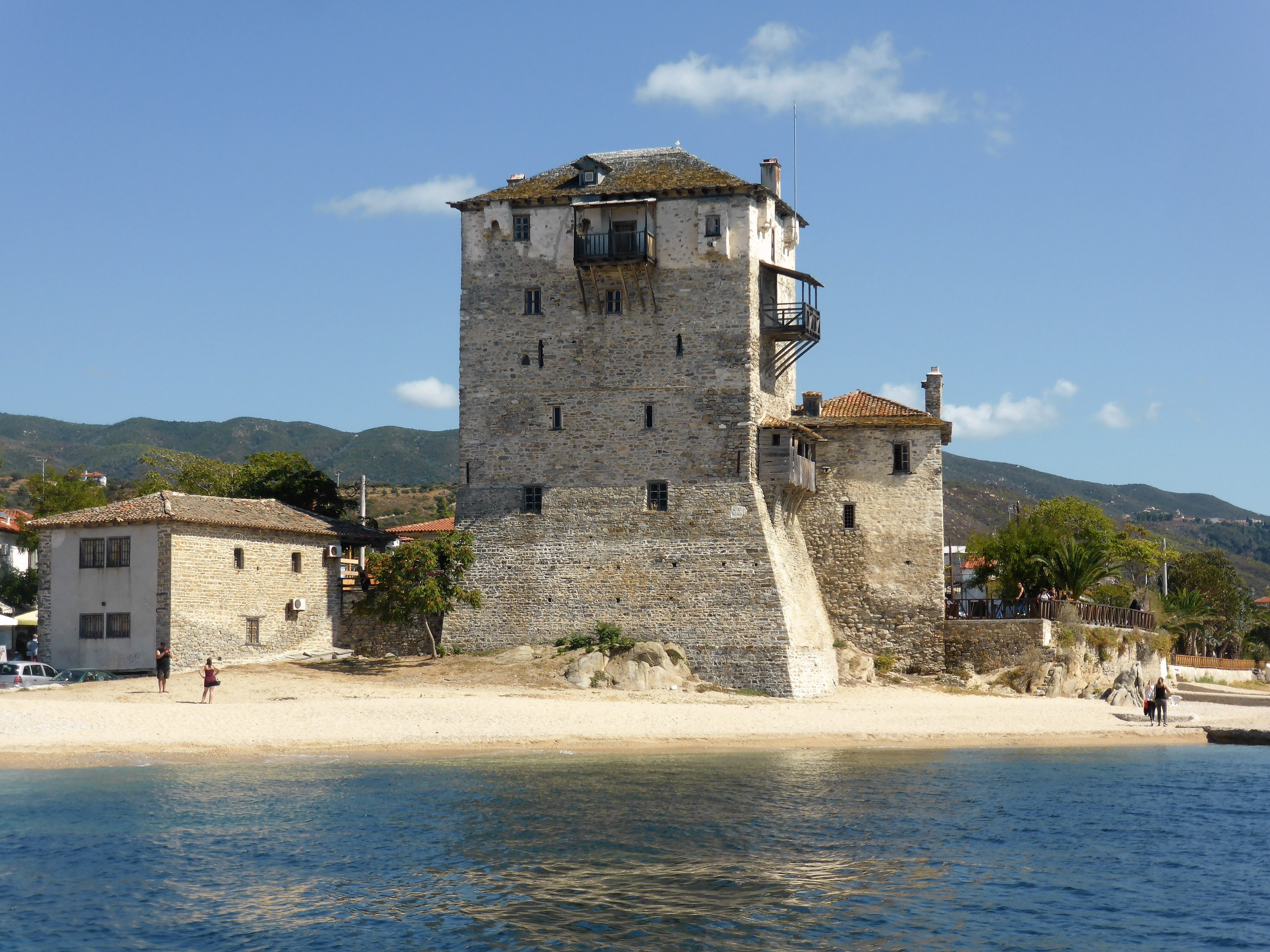
The Prosforio Tower at Ouranoupoli (Pyrgos), the residence of Sydney and Joice Loch.

In 1928 Joice and Sydney Loch moved into the old tower on the sea-front at Pyrgos and began the process of turning the building into a home. A lower room was converted to a study for Joice, with a oak desk built by the local carpenter. She completed her novel, The Fourteen Thumbs of St. Peter and wrote a series of articles called 'Modern Athonians' for Blackwood's Magazine about the Chalkidiki region and the refugee villagers. The residents of the village continued to come to Joice Loch for medical assistance, despite her insistence she was a writer, not a doctor, and had only been trained as a medical orderly. She was by now earning an income from freelance journalism, but used much of her income to buy medicine and dressings for the villagers and held regular health clinics.

Joice Loch discovered a viable solution to the problem of self-help for Pyrgos village after meeting a villager who had previously lived at Kayseri in central Turkey where she worked as a weaver of silk and woollen rugs. The local carpenter, who had also lived at Kayseri, was experienced in making looms, so Joice commissioned him to construct one for the woman. She later discovered that other women in the village were skilled rug-weavers. Using a small legacy she had received after the death of an aunt, Joice established a women's rug-weaving co-operative in the village. More looms were commissioned and, using her Quaker connections, arrangements were made to purchase wool from the island of Chios, have it spun in a factory at Thessaloniki and then transported to Pyrgos. Joice decided to market Pyrgos rugs as having a distinctly Greek identity, incorporating Byzantine design motifs, planning to sell them as unique hand-woven collectibles to affluent Greeks and foreigners. Using her husband's monastic photographs as reference sources, she provided the designs for the floor coverings woven by the village women. Joice also decided that only natural hand-produced dyes would be used in the manufacture of the rugs. The earliest rugs were woven using natural wool colours, but using local knowledge and experimentation, natural dyes produced from material such as herbs, berries, onion skins and bark began to be used to colour the raw wool for incorporation into the designs. Pyrgos rugs won first prize at an international handcraft show held at Thessaloniki, after which rugs began to be commissioned from the village weavers for re-sale.

Joice Loch was awarded the Order of the Redeemer by the Greek government on two occasions. The first medal in 1931 was in recognition of her free medical clinics in Pyrgos village and the second in 1932, the highest grade of the award, was in honour of her establishment of the Pyrgos rugs co-operative in the village. In 1935 Joice Loch was a recipient of a gold medal from the Greek National Academy for the establishment of Pyrgos rugs.

On 26 September 1932 an earthquake destroyed the town of Ierissos, in the Greek province of Chalkidiki, and caused extensive damage to nearby villages, including Pyrgos at the gateway to the Athos peninsula. The Lochs administered first aid to residents of Pyrgos for thirty hours before relief arrived at the village. The couple then acted as interpreters to doctors and demolition units at the site. With the resulting destruction and damage to houses in Prygos, many of the villagers initially lived in tents supplied by the Red Cross and the Greek army. The Society of Friends asked the Lochs to undertake relief activities in the village, the work involving the strengthening of damaged houses, running a soup kitchen for children and overseeing the use of a newly-erected wooden building, used for a school in the daytime and sleeping quarters at night for those whose homes were destroyed. The Prosforio tower had sustained structural damage during the earthquake, for which the Greek government agreed to undertake restoration work. After the earthquake the Lochs initially lived in a tent (until December 1932) after which they rented a stone house in the village which had remained intact.

In about May 1933, for the part she had played in saving earthquake victims, Joice received a second Greek Order of the Phoenix medal. Later that year she was invited to London to receive an award as a Member of the Order of the British Empire (MBE) from King George V, an invitation she declined in order to save the expense. Her medal was sent to Athens where she attended an investiture at the British Embassy.

In 1935 the monarchy was restored in Greece. In 1938 the Lochs were each awarded medals from the George II, king of the Hellenes, in recognition of their services in providing unpaid medical assistance and establishing the rug weaving co-operative in Pyrgos village. In 1939 Joice handed over the primary responsibility of running Pyrgos Rugs to the village women.

=== World War II ===
After the Nazi invasion of Poland and the outbreak of World War II in September 1939, followed by the invasion of eastern Poland by the Soviet Union, hundreds of thousands of Polish refugees escaped to neutral Romania and Hungary (many of them the families and widows of captured and killed Polish soldiers). Romania was an important trading partner of Germany and, fearing a German invasion, the Romanian monarch issued orders to intern all male Polish refugees of fighting age in order to appease Hitler. The Lochs in Greece, concerned for the fate of the Polish refugees in Romania, contacted the Friends War Relief in London to volunteer their services. In December 1939 Sydney Loch was appointed head of a new Friends Relief Mission to Polish civilians in Romania, with Joice given the responsibility of delivering humanitarian aid to Polish women and children.

The Lochs travelled to Bucharest by overnight train where Joice took on the responsibility of feeding and clothing the Polish women and children, including a number of Jewish orphans. She enlisted the help of Countess Lushya, a survivor of a Polish aristocratic family, who proved to be an adept fundraiser. Lushya used her contacts within the Romanian aristocracy to form the Polish Refugees Committee to raise funds and find accommodation. In April 1940 the Lochs were the recipients of awards presented by Carol II of Romania for volunteer workers helping Polish refugees; Joice was awarded the Order of Elizabeth and Sydney the Order of the Star.

One day Lushya approached Joice Loch requesting funds for a printing press to produce a Polish-language newspaper in one of the two internment camps for male refugees. Lushya also admitted that the press would also be used to produce forged exit visas, allowing those who escaped or bribed their way out of the camp to cross the mountains to the border with Turkey, and thence to Cyprus and Palestine. Many of the young men wished to reach England and fight for Poland alongside British forces. Joice agreed to donate the printing press from the Quaker funds and ask no questions beyond its use for printing a newspaper. By Easter 1940 the two barbed-wire encampments was nearly empty of men of fighting age. Those who remained were mostly middle-aged or elderly.

By about mid-year 1940 King Carol, under pressure from Hitler, lifted a ban on the activities of Romania's Fascist Party and announced an amnesty for acts of violence committed by the pro-Nazi Iron Guard who had been terrorising Jewish and pro-British citizens. Francesca Wilson, head of the Friends War Relief in the Hungarian capital, Budapest, visited Joice Loch in Bucharest and told her the Quaker Relief Mission in Hungary had been closed because of the rising popularity of pro-Nazi politicians and Polish refugees were being advised to escape to Romania.

The political situation in Romania became increasingly unstable with the increased activity of pro-Nazi forces, border incursions by both Germany and the Soviet Union and King Carol's declining popularity and control. The Lochs reported the precarious situation of Polish and Jewish refugees in Romania to the Quakers in London and the British War Office, and requested funds to get them out of the country. Official permission was granted for two thousand civilian refugees to be accommodated in an army camp in British-controlled Cyprus (on the proviso that no more than ten percent of their number be Jewish). The undertaking, involving an escape by ship, was named 'Operation Swordfish'.

The Lochs also devised another escape plan, called 'Operation Pied Piper', involving the transport of five hundred Polish men by river steamer to Constanța on the Black Sea, to be joined by four hundred and fifty Polish women and children and fifty Jewish children, travelling by train to Constanța, and as many as possible of the Polish women and children being accommodated in holiday villas on the Black Sea coast. By early September 1940 the political situation had further deteriorated; with the Iron Guard increasingly active, the Romanian king appointed the pro-Nazi General Ion Antonescu as premier and abdicated in favour of his son who would reign as King Michael of Romania. Sydney left Joice in charge of the refugees and travelled ahead to Turkey with the 'Operation Swordfish' refugees to try and organise transportation onward to Cyprus. 'Operation Pied Piper' commenced on 16 September when the large group of women and children departed from the Bucharest railway station for Constanța, where they were joined at the ferry terminal by the Polish widows, wives and children from the holiday villas. With the refugees on board, the ferry crossed the Black Sea to Istanbul in Turkey, where they were met by another group of Polish refugees who had escaped from Romania months earlier.

From Istanbul the group travelled by ferry to Mersin, near the border with Syria, where many Polish refugees from Romania and Hungary had gathered in their efforts to reach Cyprus and Palestine. After visiting the British consulate that had opened at the port, Joice learned by letter that Sydney had hired three fishing boats to take their group of refugees to Cyprus. The largest of the hired boats arrived after a week, but Joice was concerned about the prevalence of sickness and disease at Mersin and the inadequate toilet facilities on the boat. She decided to contact the British Embassy in Istanbul to request the use of a British Navy vessel to transport the refugees. After several days the Warszawa arrived at Mersin harbour, a former coastal steamer with a volunteer crew of Polish and British sailors. The ship had previously transported British soldiers from Dunkirk and been involved in transporting Jews to safety. Together with a group of escaped Polish soldiers bound for Palestine, the group of Polish women and children left Mersin during the night and arrived at Famagusta harbour on the island of Cyprus, where they disembarked.

=== Refugees in Palestine ===
After the invasion of mainland Greece by the Axis powers in April 1941 and the capture of Crete a month later, the British government decided to evacuate the Polish refugees on Cyprus to the British-administered mandate of Palestine. In June 1941 Joice and Sydney Loch travelled by naval cruiser to Haifa, a major port city in Palestine, accompanying over two thousand refugees. At Haifa the Lochs were informed that the British Army, who ran the nearby refugee camps, had no funds to feed the Polish civilian refugees. The couple travelled to Jerusalem where they managed to persuade the director of the Ottoman Bank to honour the Quakers' letter of credit and release funds from the Friends War Relief account. Polish refugees continued to arrive in Palestine, many of whom had been imprisoned in Siberian labour camps. The Lochs were eventually responsible for the welfare of twelve thousand Poles, including nine thousand widows and children, housed in two huge new camps on the outskirts of Tel-Aviv. Sydney spent much of his time negotiating better conditions for the refugees. He was later appointed as a staff liaison officer with the acting rank of major. The British authorities had also set up camps near Gaza City for Greek refugees. When the Lochs visited the camps they discovered there was no food relief for the refugees. Sydney wrote a report to the Friends Relief Service in London requesting donations, and received funding to start a soup kitchen. Joice wrote letters to the authorities in Australia urging them to accept Polish families and widows as migrants, but the country's restrictive immigration policy remained unchanged until after the war.

In Jerusalem in January 1944 Joice and Sydney Loch were presented with Gold Cross of Merit medals by Michal Budny, the Secretary of the Polish Embassy in London, for their work in helping homeless refugees in eastern Poland.

=== Return to Greece ===
During the Italian and German occupation of Greece large numbers of the population had died of starvation and malnutrition was widespread in the country. The United Nations Relief and Rehabilitation Administration (UNRRA) asked Joice to return to Greece and set up official aid programs to villages, but she remained in Palestine to ensure a smooth transition for a new Quaker team to take responsibility for the Polish refugees in Tel-Aviv, which was carried out in August 1944. Sydney Loch had received a letter from the American Board of Missions offering him the job of acting head of the American Farm School near Thessaloniki. The previous head of the school, Charles House, had been interned in Germany and was recuperating in America after his ordeal. Sydney entered Greece in November 1944 with the first British Military Liaison unit.

In the power vacuum following the withdrawal of Axis troops in late-1944, Macedonia and Thrace in northern Greece became the focus of a civil war between a Communist insurgency led by the Communist Party of Greece (KKE), supported by Albania and Yugoslavia, and the Greek monarchist government, supported by the British and Americans.

After arriving at Thessaloniki and the American Farm School, Sydney Loch set about restoring and rebuilding damaged buildings on the campus. Joice Loch left Palestine in February 1945 and joined her husband at the Farm School. As the civil war raged in the villages and rural areas of northern Greece, the Lochs continued the work of rehabilitating the campus, with the British Army donating building materials and providing soldiers to help with the reconstruction, with aid relief measures provided by UNRRA and Quaker organisations. Charles House, the previous director of the Farm School, arrived in September 1945 and took over administration of the facility. The Lochs continued to live on campus, with Joice teaching girls at the renovated school. Accompanied by an armed escort, Sydney undertook army liaison work delivering aid to villages near the Yugoslav border. Joice later became involved with UNRRA humanitarian relief work, involved in agricultural aid schemes and delivering medical supplies to isolated villages.

By the end of the civil war in 1949 the Lochs were able to return to Pyrgos (now renamed Ouranoupoli), where they resumed living in their home in the Prosphori tower. They assisted the villagers rebuild their lives after the years of warfare. Joice organised the restoration of the rug-weaving co-operative and sold rugs in Britain, America and Australia. She restarted her free medical service in the village, and used income from published articles and book royalties to fund local amenities such as the services of a doctor and road construction and repair to connect the village to the wider world.

Sydney Loch died of a stroke on 6 February 1954, while sitting beside the fire in Prosphori tower at Ouranoupoli. He was buried at the American Farm School on 10 February. He had recently completed the manuscript of a book on the Athos monastry and had completed typing out the sixth chapter earlier that day. Joice Loch later finished the typing and edited the book, which was published in 1957.

=== Later years ===
After her husband's death Joice continued her rug-making work. She used royalties from her writings to establish a clean water supply at Ouranoupoli. From 1955 a Swiss woman, Martha Handschin, began living with Joice in her Byzantine tower home, learning her methods of weaving and applying dyes in making Pyrgos rugs.

After her husband's death Joice Loch maintained her love of travel, visiting friends and admirers in Europe, Australia and America. In Kenya and Rhodesia she was the guest of Poles she had helped to escape the Nazi death camps. On a visit to Egypt Joice took an extended boat trip on the Blue Nile. In late 1964 Joice, in company with Handschin and another friend, travelled by ship to Australia, taking with her twenty-seven of the hand-loomed Pyrgos rugs ranging from the earliest examples in natural wool colours to the later dyed rugs. The Pyrgos rugs were exhibited in Adelaide, Sydney and Melbourne.^{[E]}

During her life, for her humanitarian work, Joice Loch was awarded eleven medals, including the Greek Order of the Phoenix, the Polish gold Cross of Merit and the Romanian Order of Elizabeth. In addition to the honours bestowed on her by Greece, Romania and Poland, she was also honoured by Serbia and her home country Australia. In 1972 on the recommendation of the Australian government she was appointed a Member of the Order of the British Empire (MBE) for "international relations".

In about 1966 Joice Loch suffered a serious fall from the balcony of a village house, landing onto paving stones two metres below. She was taken by car two hours away to Thessaloniki where x-rays revealed a badly fractured skull and a broken right arm and wrist, as well as slight damage to her left hand. Her recovery was slow; she suffered from cognitive decline, including severe memory loss, and her right arm and hand remained in plaster for eighteen months. With the help of friends and a paid typist Joice completed her memoirs, published as A Fringe of Blue in 1968.

Joice Loch continued to live in Prosphori tower at Ouranoupoli, her residence shared by her companions and carers, Martha Handschin and Fani Mitropoulou. Known by the villagers of Ouranoupoli as 'Kyria Loch' and often referred to as 'the lady in the tower', she received many visitors as well as friends who stayed with her for periods of time.

Joice Nankivell Loch died of a brain haemorrhage on 8 October 1982, at her home in Ouranoupoli, aged ninety-five. Out of respect the local shops closed for three days and nights and the villagers held all-night vigils beside her open coffin. She was buried in the local cemetery with Greek Orthodox rites, her funeral procession led by priests from Ouranoupoli, Ierissos and Athos. Sydney's coffin was returned from the American Farm School and reburied beside his wife.

== Publications ==
=== Fiction ===
- Joice NanKivell (1916), The Cobweb Ladder, Melbourne: Lothian Book Publishing Co.; illustrated by Edith Alsop.
- Sydney de Loghe (1917), Pelican Pool: A Novel, Sydney: Angus & Robertson.
- Joice M. NanKivell (1918), The Solitary Pedestrian: A Book of Sketches, Melbourne: Australasian Authors' Agency.
- Sydney Loch (1925), Three Predatory Women, London: George Allen & Unwin Ltd.
- Joice NanKivell Loch (1926), The Fourteen Thumbs of St. Peter, London: John Murray.
- J. M. Loch (1936), The Hopping Ha'penny, London: Methuen & Company Ltd.
- Joice M. NanKivell (1954), Tales of Christophilos, Boston; Houghton Mifflin Company; illustrated by Panos Ghikas.
- Joice M. NanKivell (1959), Again Christopholus, Boston; Houghton Mifflin Company; illustrated by Panos Ghikas.
- Joice NanKivell Loch (1980), Collected Poems, Burford, Oxfordshire: Cygnet Press.

=== Non-fiction ===
- Sydney de Loghe (1916), The Straits Impregnable, Melbourne: Australasian Authors Agency.
- Joice M. NanKivell & Sydney Loch (1922), Ireland in Travail, London: John Murray.
- Joice M. NanKivell & Sydney Loch (1924), The River of a Hundred Ways: Life in the War-devastated Areas of Eastern Poland, London: George Allen & Unwin.
- Susan A. B. House (1939), A Life for the Balkans: The Story of John Henry House of the American Farm School, Thessaloniki, Greece, "as told by his wife to J. M. NanKivell", New York: Fleming H. Revell Company.
- Sydney Loch (1957), Athos: The Holy Mountain, London: Lutterworth Press.
- Joice M. NanKivell (1964), Prosporion – Uranopolous Rugs and Dyes, Istanbul: American Board Publication Department.
- Joice NanKivell Loch (1968), A Fringe of Blue: An Autobiography, London: John Murray.

== Notes ==
A.Charles George 'Geoffrey' Nankivell enlisted in the Australian Imperial Force at Randwick, New South Wales, in September 1914 and served in the 4th Battalion, Australian Infantry. He was promoted to sergeant in October 1915 and was killed on active service on 25 July 1916 during the Battle of Pozières. Nankivell was buried near Pozières in northern France and is commemorated at the Villiers-Bretonneux Memorial. He was posthumously awarded the Military Medal "for conspicuous bravery and devotion to duty in the field".

B.Frederick Sydney Loch was born in London in 1889, the third son of Frederick Pharye Loch and Georgina (née Burn). His father had begun a career in the law but left to study singing at La Scala in Milan, Italy, where he met Georgina, the daughter of a London engineer, who was studying singing and drama in Milan. After they married and returned to London, Frederick's father made a living as a singing teacher. Young Frederick was most often known by his second name of 'Sydney'. In about 1903, when Sydney was fourteen, he became ill with rheumatic fever and was sent for six months to live with an aunt and uncle who owned a villa at Nice on the French Riviera. Loch sailed to Australia in 1905, aged 17. He found work as a jackaroo on a sheep station in western Victoria. Later he worked on a cattle station in Queensland. After deciding to become a writer, Loch travelled in the far north of Australia and worked on pearling vessels off Darwin and Thursday Island. He joined the Australian Imperial Force (AIF) at the outbreak of World War I, enlisting in Melbourne in August 1914. He was placed in the 2nd Australian Field Artillery Brigade as a gunner, under the command of Lieutenant Colonel George Johnston. At Gallipoli Loch was placed in the role of galloper to the commanding officer. Loch suffered a severe attack of enteric fever at Gallipoli in July 1915 and was hospitalised at Alexandria in Egypt, suffering from nerve damage caused by polyneuritis. In February 1916 he was invalided to Australia aboard the Ulysses and eventually discharged from the armed forces in August 1916. In November 1917 Sydney Loch was living in Brewster Street in Essendon.

C.Joice and Sydney Loch's book titled The River of a Hundred Ways was published by Allen and Unwin in September 1924, an account of their humanitarian work in the war-devastated region of eastern Poland.

D.Prior to 1946 the village established around the imposing Byzantine watchtower was named either Pyrgos or Prosforion, both names referring to the tower on the shoreline. The Lochs referred to the village as Pyrgos, named for the Greek word for 'tower' (πύργος). Prosforion, the other name for the village, refers to the specific name of the structure, the Prosforio Tower. After World War II the village council successfully petitioned the Government to change the village name to Ouranoupoli, the name of an ancient city in that locality dating back to the days of Philip II of Macedon (which was eventually destroyed in an earthquake).

E.In 1965, during her visit to Australia, Joice Loch donated nine examples of Pyrgos rugs to "the people of Australia", intending them to be placed in the projected National Gallery of Australia (NGA) in Canberra. In the meantime the nine rugs were sent overseas by the Australian government to various Australian embassies. In 1980, with the NGA in the process of being constructed, the rugs passed into the care of Artbank, a newly-established government art rental program, when it was discovered that seven of the nine rugs were missing (apparently taken from the embassies by public servants after their periods of service had ended). A Pyrgos rug, designed by Joice Loch, is held in the collection of the Powerhouse Museum in Sydney.
