= Lettice Jowitt =

Lettice Jowitt (1878–1962) was a Quaker educationist and refugee worker, and the first warden at the Bensham Grove settlement in Gateshead.

== Life ==
Lettice Jowitt was born into a large Anglican family in Stevenage, the daughter of William Jowitt, a rector and headmaster. Her brother, William Jowitt, was a lawyer, politician and Lord Chancellor. Educated at Somerville College, Oxford, Jowitt gained experience in education in Bristol, working as a tutor at the University of Bristol, as well as for the Workers' Educational Association. In 1911, she was a co-founder (alongside Hilda Cashmore) of the Bristol University Settlement, and later recalled as a 'pioneer in the Resident Settlement movement'. Young residents remembered her as having 'grace and good looks', and having a 'charming gift' for 'encouraging them to think and read'.

During the First World War, Jowitt undertook relief work in France.

In 1919, Jowitt moved to Gateshead to oversee the newly established Bensham Grove settlement, intended to be a 'common meeting ground for men and women to learn through class study, discussions, music and fruits of Fellowship’. Jowitt was the 'first and most influential' of all the wardens at Bensham Grove. She believed that educational settlements should ‘seek to unsettle those who had narrow personal aims and were content with the injustices and inequalities of the social system in which they live’. Among the settlements established after World War I, Bensham Grove was unusual in having a female warden and a residential element. Jowitt saw the challenges and significant social deprivation in Gateshead, and gathered a group of residents ('settlers') with welfare and reform in mind. She helped to establish the first Mother and Child welfare clinic in Gateshead, and the first nursery school in the North-East. Jowitt was warden of Bensham Grove for ten years, from 1919 to 1929.

In 1931, she acquired Rock House in Seaham, to run as an educational settlement similar to Bensham Grove. It was intended to be 'a centre... for social and ethical education'. Jowitt was warden at Rock House between 1931 and 1937. It later became Seaham Rock House Community Association, joining with other educational institutions in the town.

During the Second World War, Jowitt again engaged in educational and relief work. She worked as acting principal at the Friends' school in Brummana, and then taught at the American University of Beirut. In 1942, she was asked to investigate the conditions of Polish refugees in Tanganyika and Uganda, teaching and living for two years in one of the largest camps.

Following the war, Jowitt worked for 18 months as general secretary of the Friends Relief Service, and spoke about her experiences at various Quaker meeting houses around the country.

Lettice Jowitt died in Ipswich aged 84.
