= Alastair Heron =

British psychologist and writer

Alastair Heron (1915 – 17 March 2009) was a British psychologist and writer. A member of the Religious Society of Friends, or Quakers, he wrote a number of books and pamphlets on Quakers in Britain.

== Quaker works ==
Heron was a member of Balby Monthly Meeting, and attended Sheffield Central Meeting of the Religious Society of Friends. In 1986 he spent nine weeks traveling in the ministry in Australia, and three years later did the same coast-to-coast in Canada.

His first Quaker book, Caring, Conviction, Commitment, was published in 1992. It resulted from the survey he carried out in Yorkshire to learn at first hand of the experiences of attenders from the time of their first entry into a Quaker meeting. In 1994, he published a small dictionary, Quaker Speak, as one of his responses to the needs discovered in the Yorkshire survey. In 1996 his major work, Quakers in Britain; a century of change, was the only book to mark the centenary of the Manchester Conference that had opened the way for what later became known as the 'liberal stage' in British Quaker history. Abstracted from it came The British Quakers: 1647 to 1997, a (first modern) introduction to inform newcomers. His autobiography, Only One Life: A Quaker's Voyage was published in 1998.

== List of books and pamphlets by year ==
- Towards a Quaker View of Sex: An Essay by a Group of Friends, ed.; Friends Home Service Committee, 1963
- Gifts and Ministries: A Discussion Paper on Eldership; Unknown, 1987 (pamphlet)
- Charity, Liberty, Unity: A Quaker Search for Essentials; The Religious Society of Friends (Quakers) in Australia Inc.; 1988 (pamphlet)
- Speaking to Our Condition: A Ministry to Friends; 1989 (pamphlet)
- Caring, Conviction, Commitment: Dilemmas of Quaker Membership Today; Quaker Home Service, 1992
- To Join or Not: A Guide to Quaker Membership, ed.; 1993
- Quaker Speak: First Aid for Newcomers; Quaker Outreach Yorkshire, 1994
- Now We are Quakers: The Experience and Views of New Members; 1994
- Quakers in Britain: A Century of Change 1895-1995; Curlew Graphics, 1995
- The British Quakers, 1647-1997: Highlights of Their History; Curlew Productions, 1997
- Only One Life: A Quaker's Voyage; Curlew Productions, Scotland, 1998 (autobiography)
- Our Quaker Identity: Religious society – or friendly society?; Curlew Productions, Scotland, 1999
- On Being a Quaker: Membership – Past – Present – Future; Curlew Productions, 2000
- Searching the Depths: Essays on Being a Quaker Today; ed. Harvey Gillman and Alastair Heron; Quaker Books, 1998
- The Future of British Quakers – Shrinkage Addressed: Process and Commitment; 2004. ISBN 9781900259996

== Biography ==
For thirty years Heron was research psychologist working mainly in the field of human development through the life span, and in cross-cultural studies.

In the early 1970s, he was professor and head of department of psychology in the University of Melbourne, Australia.

He and his wife Margaret reached their sixtieth wedding anniversary in November 2000, less than a year before her death at 88. His son and daughter live in England and the US respectively, and Alastair was a great-grandfather.
