= Francesca Wilson =

English schoolteacher, humanitarian, and writer

Francesca Mary Wilson (1888–1981) was an English schoolteacher, refugee relief worker and writer.

== Life ==
Francesca Wilson was born into a Quaker family in Newcastle upon Tyne. She was educated at the Central Newcastle High School for Girls and Armstrong College before studying history at Newnham College, Cambridge. She gained a Cambridge teachers' certificate in 1912, before teaching at Bath High School and Gravesend County School for Girls.

In 1914, Wilson met Belgian refugees in Gravesend, and decided to suspend her teaching to take up relief work:

My urge to do relief work was not high-minded and Ruth Fry, who interviewed me, rightly sensed that my motives were selfish. I began without dedication or any desire (except the vaguest) to do good. I wanted foreign travel, adventure, romance, the unknown.

In 1916, Wilson worked with French evacuee children at Samoëns in the Haute-Savoie, moving to Corsica the following year with the Serbian Relief Fund. She did similar work with her brother Maurice Wilson in North Africa before moving in February 1919 to distribute food and clothing in Niš, Grdelica, and Belgrade. Her first book, Portraits and Sketches of Serbia (1920) aimed to publicize Serbia's need for post-war relief. From 1919 to 1922, Wilson worked with Hilda Clark and Edith Pye for the Quaker Relief Mission in Vienna, acting as an interpreter and organizing food depots. After meeting the art educator Franz Cižek, she organized an exhibition of child art by his pupils, raising money for the recently founded Save the Children Fund. The exhibition toured the UK and the US.

In 1925, Wilson took up a job at the Edgbaston Church of England College for Girls. She opened her house in Edgbaston to a succession of refugee children:

any house that Francesca owned, however spacious, ended up crowded from cellar to attic with delightful, deserving people, the owner's territory having shrunk in no time to a more or less poky bed-sittingroom.

The white Russian refugee scholar Nikolai Bachtin (1896–1950) became a close friend, and lodgers included the biologist Maurice Wilkins. In 1929, she travelled to Macedonia to report for the Women's International League for Peace and Freedom (WILPF). Her report was delivered to the WILPF's Sixth International Congress in Prague in August 1929, and published as Yugoslavian Macedonia (1930). In the early 1930s, she travelled regularly to Germany, visiting her sister Muriel, whose husband Pallister Barkas was a lecturer at the University of Göttingen. She became increasingly worried about fascism, and opened her house to refugees including Nikolaus Pevsner. When the Spanish Civil War began in 1937 she travelled to Murcia in Southern Spain, where she organized food relief, established a children's hospital, and started occupational workshops for Spanish refugees.

In October 1939, shortly after the outbreak of the Second World War, Wilson visited Hungary to help Polish refugees. Trying to help Czechs with false identity papers to join the French army, she was at one point arrested by Hungarian secret police on the Romanian border and, in May 1940, she returned to England. She worked for refugee organizations in the UK until 1945, when she joined the new United Nations Relief and Rehabilitation Administration (UNRRA), working with displaced survivors of Dachau concentration camp outside Munich.

She became a friend and admirer of activist Klára Andrássy.

For the remainder of her life Wilson lived in London, teaching adult education classes at the University of London and for the Workers' Educational Association. She died at the Royal Free Hospital on 5 March 1981.

== Works ==
- Portraits and sketches of Serbia. London: Swarthmore Press, 1920.
- Yugoslavian Macedonia. London: Women's International League, 1930. With a foreword by G. P. Gooch.
- In the margins of chaos; recollections of relief work in and between three wars. London: John Murray, 1944.
- Aftermath: France, Germany, Austria, Yugoslavia 1945 and 1946. West Drayton: Penguin, 1947.
- Strange island; Britain through foreign eyes, 1395-1940. London: Longmans Green and Co, 1955.
- They Came as Strangers: The Story of Refugees to Britain. London: Hamish Hamilton, 1959.
- Rebel Daughter of a Country House: The story of Eglantyne Jebb, Founder of the Save the Children Fund. London: Allen and Unwin, 1967.
- Muscovy: Russia through foreign eyes, 1553-1900. New York: Praeger, 1970.
