= Nikolai Bachtin =

Lecturer in classics and linguistics (1894–1950)

Nikolai Mikhailovich Bachtin (Russian: Никола́й Миха́йлович Бахти́н; 1894 – 1950) was a lecturer in classics and linguistics at the University of Birmingham, England, and literary theorist Mikhail Bakhtin's older brother. Bachtin was a friend of the philosopher Ludwig Wittgenstein. Bachtin's papers are held at the University of Birmingham archive.
