= List of Archibald Prize winners =

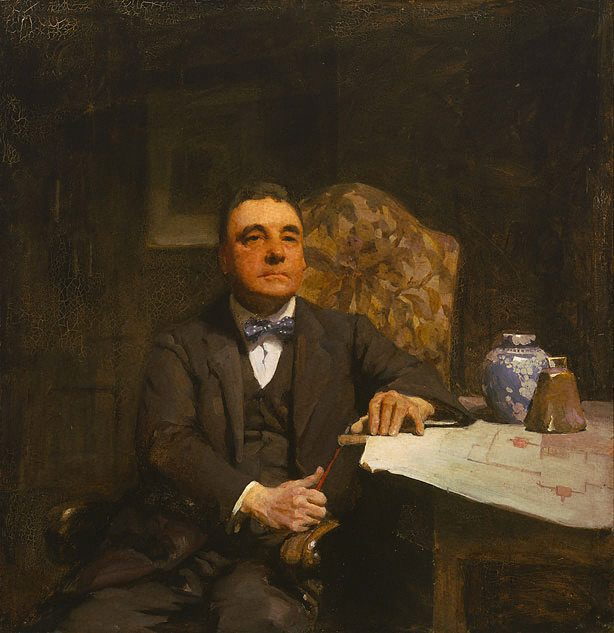
1921 Desbrowe Annear by W B McInnes was the first Archibald Prize winner

This is a list of winners of the annual Archibald Prize for portraiture, first awarded in 1921.

== List of winners ==
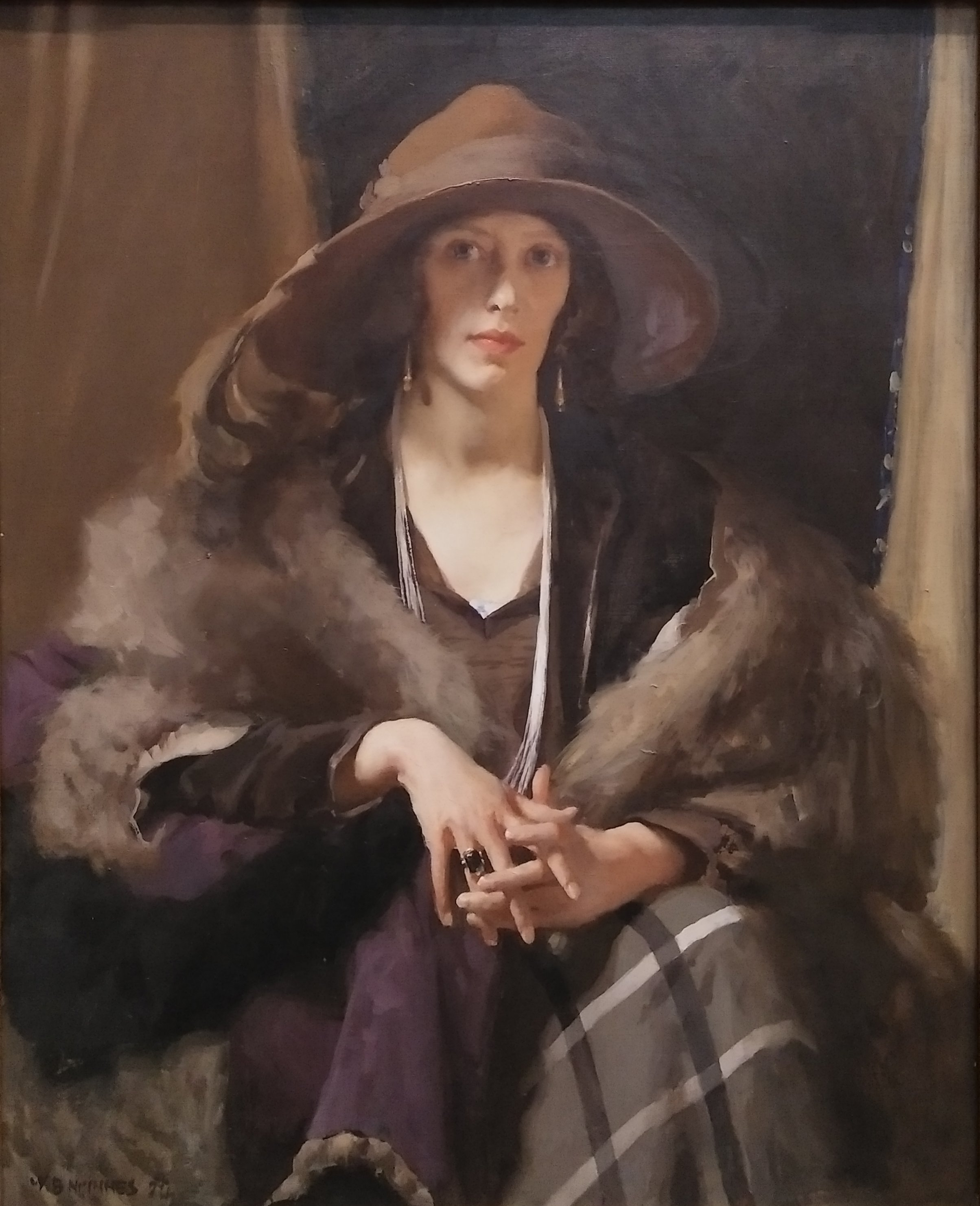
1924 Miss Collins by W B McInnes

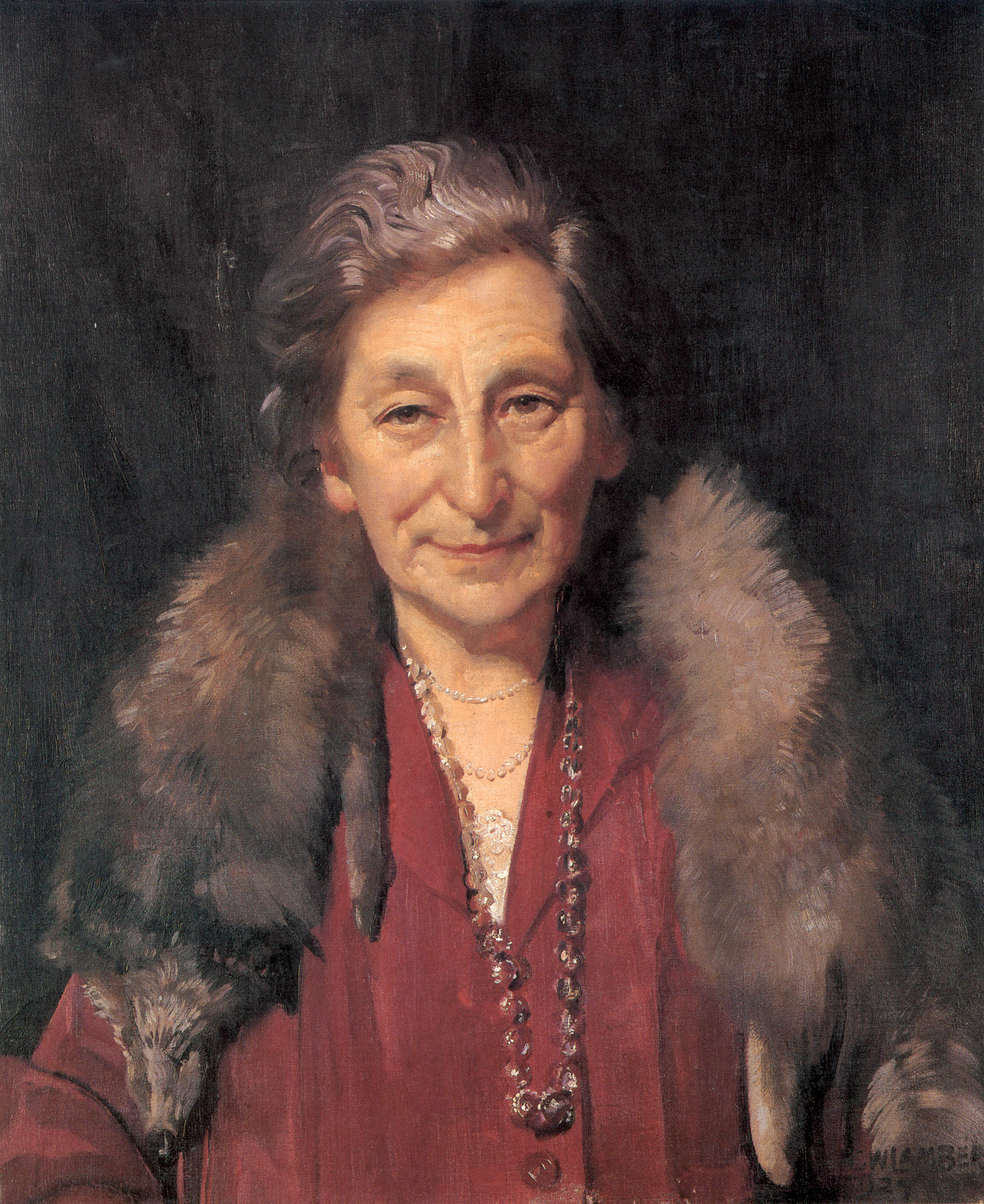
1927 Mrs Annie Murdoch by G. W. Lambert

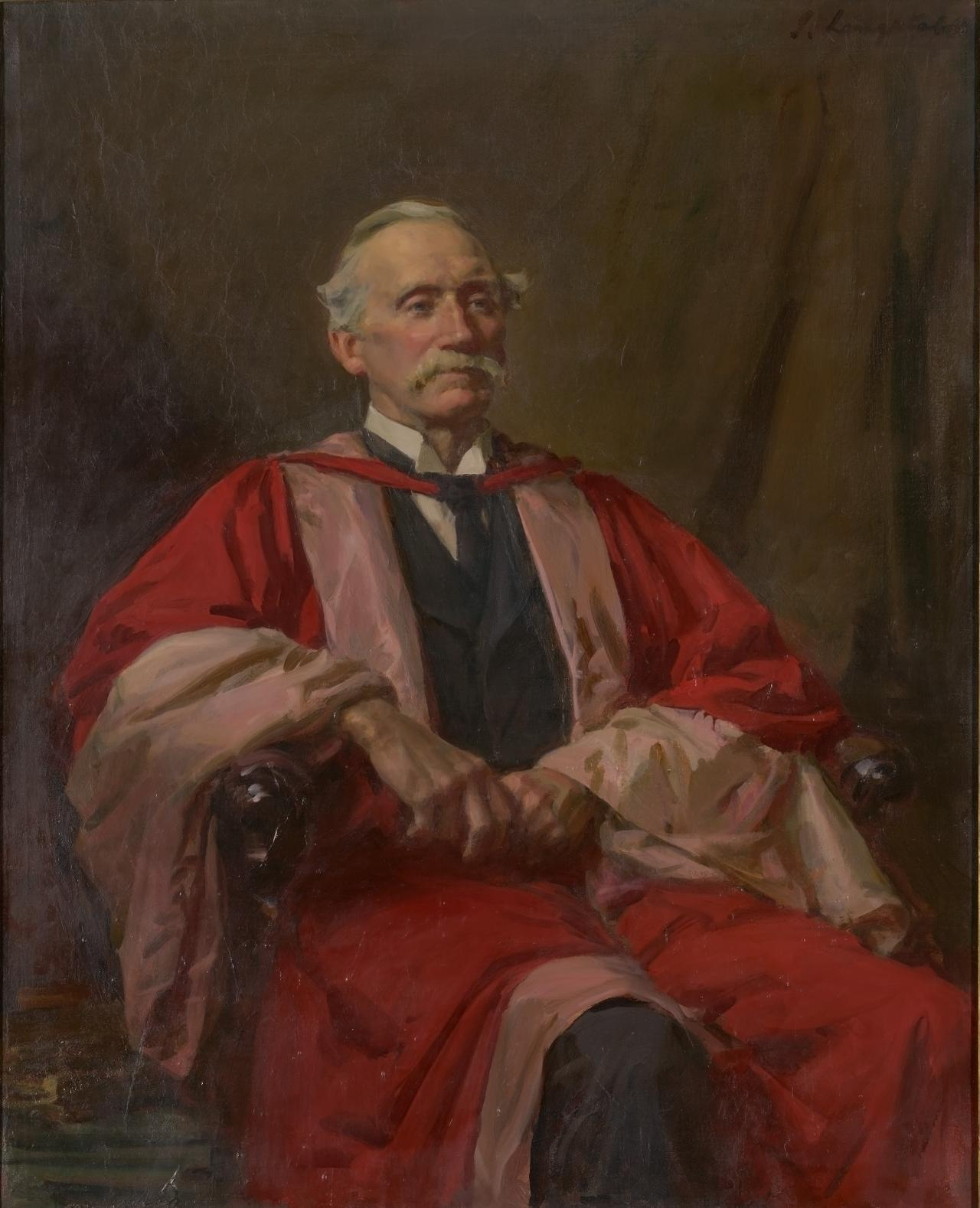
1928 Dr Alexander Leeper by John Longstaff

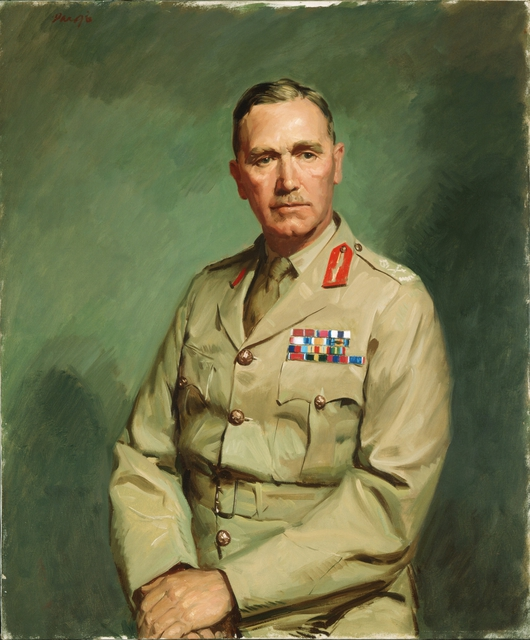
1945 LtGen Edmund Herring by William Dargie

Year	No. of Finalists	Artist	Title	Subject	Notes
1921	45	W B McInnes	Desbrowe Annear	Harold Desbrowe-Annear	
1922	53	W B McInnes	Professor Harrison Moore	William Harrison Moore	
1923	50	W B McInnes	Portrait of a Lady		
1924	40	W B McInnes	Miss Collins	Gladys Neville Collins	
1925	74	John Longstaff	Maurice Moscovitch	Maurice Moscovitch	
1926	58	W B McInnes	Silk and Lace (Miss Esther Paterson)	Esther Paterson	
1927	56	George W. Lambert	Mrs Annie Murdoch	Annie Murdoch	
1928	66	John Longstaff	Dr Alexander Leeper	Alexander Leeper	
1929	75	John Longstaff	The Hon W A Holman, KC	William Holman	
1930	67	W B McInnes	Drum-Major Harry McClelland	Harry McClelland	
1931	74	John Longstaff	Sir John Sulman	John Sulman	
1932	70	Ernest Buckmaster	Sir William Irvine	William Irvine	
1933		Charles Wheeler	Ambrose Pratt	Ambrose Pratt	
1934	92	Henry Hanke	Self Portrait	Henry Hanke	
1935	120	John Longstaff	AB (Banjo) Paterson	Banjo Paterson	
1936	137	W B McInnes	Dr Julian Smith	Julian Smith	
1937	141	Normand Baker	Self portrait	Normand Baker	
1938	145	Nora Heysen	Mme Elink Schuurman	Adine Michele Elink Schuurman	
1939	135	Max Meldrum	Hon G J Bell, C.M.G., D.S.O., V.D., (Speaker, House of Representatives)	George John Bell	
1940	156	Max Meldrum	Dr J Forbes McKenzie	Forbes McKenzie	
1941	133	William Dargie	Sir James Elder, KBE	Sir James Elder	
1942	111	William Dargie	Corporal Jim Gordon, VC	Jim Gordon	
1943	148	William Dobell	Mr Joshua Smith	Joshua Smith	
1944	185	Joshua Smith	Speaker, House of Representatives, Hon. J. S. Rosevear, M.P.	Sol Rosevear	
1945	197	William Dargie	Lt-General The Hon Edmund Herring, KBC, DSO, MC, ED	Edmund Herring	
1946	80	William Dargie	L C Robson, MC, MA	Robson	
1947	84	William Dargie	Sir Marcus Clark, Kt., K.B.E. [sic]	Reginald Marcus Clark	
1948	81	William Dobell	Margaret Olley	Margaret Olley	
1949	81	Arthur Murch	Bonar Dunlop	Bonar Dunlop	
1950	86	William Dargie	Sir Leslie McConnan	Leslie McConnan	
1951	92	Ivor Hele	Laurie Thomas	Thomas	
1952	83	William Dargie	Mr Essington Lewis, CH	Essington Lewis	
1953	72	Ivor Hele	Sir Henry Simpson Newland, CBE, DSO, MS, FRCS	Henry Simpson Newland	
1954	77	Ivor Hele	Rt. Hon. R. G. Menzies, P.C., C.H., Q.C., M.P.	Robert Menzies	
1955	88	Ivor Hele	Robert Campbell Esq	Robert Campbell	
1956	61	William Dargie	Mr Albert Namatjira	Albert Namatjira	
1957	69	Ivor Hele	Self portrait	Ivor Hele	
1958	66	William Pidgeon	Mr Ray Walker	Walker	
1959	66	William Dobell	Dr Edward MacMahon	MacMahon	
1960	80	Judy Cassab	Stanislaus Rapotec	Stanislav Rapotec	
1961	61	William Pidgeon	Rabbi Dr I. Porush	Israel Porush	
1962	81	Louis Kahan	Patrick White	Patrick White	
1963	65	Jack Carington Smith	Professor James McAuley	James McAuley	
1964		No Award			
1965	63	Clifton Pugh	RA Henderson, Esq	Rupert "Rags" Henderson	
1966	71	Jon Molvig	Charles Blackman	Charles Blackman	
1967	41	Judy Cassab	Margo Lewers	Margo Lewers	
1968	141	William Pidgeon	Lloyd Rees	Lloyd Rees	
1969	71	Ray Crooke	George Johnston	George Johnston	
1970	15	Eric Smith	Gruzman – architect	Neville Gruzman	
1971	17	Clifton Pugh	Sir John McEwen	John McEwen	
1972	53	Clifton Pugh	The Hon E.G. Whitlam	Gough Whitlam	
1973	53	Janet Dawson	Michael Boddy	Michael Boddy	
1974	50	Sam Fullbrook	Jockey Norman Stephens	Norman Stephens	
1975	40	Kevin Connor	The Hon Sir Frank Kitto, KBE	Frank Kitto	
1976	29	Brett Whiteley	Self portrait in the studio	Brett Whiteley	
1977	35	Kevin Connor	Robert Klippel	Robert Klippel	
1978	39	Brett Whiteley	Art, Life and the other thing	Brett Whiteley	
1979	35	Wes Walters	Portrait of Phillip Adams	Phillip Adams	
1980		No Award			
1981	24	Eric Smith	Rudy Komon	Rudy Komon	
1982	26	Eric Smith	Peter Sculthorpe	Peter Sculthorpe	
1983	28	Nigel Thomson	Chandler Coventry	Chandler Coventry	
1984	27	Keith Looby	Max Gillies	Max Gillies	
1985	25	Guy Warren	Flugelman with Wingman	Bert Flugelman	
1986	26	Davida Allen	Dr John Arthur McKelvey Shera	Shera	
1987	26	William Robinson	Equestrian Self Portrait	William Robinson	
1988	25	Fred Cress	John Beard	John Stanley Beard	
1989	24	Bryan Westwood	Portrait of Elwyn Lynn	Elwyn Lynn	
1990	31	Geoffrey Proud	Dorothy Hewett	Dorothy Hewett	
1991/92		Bryan Westwood	The Prime Minister	Paul Keating	
1993	27	Garry Shead	Tom Thompson	Tom Thompson	
1994	32	Francis Giacco	Homage to John Reichard	Reichard	
1995	28	William Robinson	Self Portrait with Stunned Mullet	William Robinson	
1996	32	Wendy Sharpe	Self Portrait – as Diana of Erskineville	Wendy Sharpe	
1997	31	Nigel Thomson	Barbara Blackman	Barbara Blackman	
1998	29	Lewis Miller	Portrait of Allan Mitelman No 3	Allan Mitelman	
1999	33	Euan Macleod	Self-portrait/head like a hole	Euan Macleod	
2000	48	Adam Cullen	Portrait of David Wenham	David Wenham	
2001	31	Nicholas Harding	John Bell as King Lear	John Bell	
2002	31	Cherry Hood	Simon Tedeschi unplugged	Simon Tedeschi	
2003	32	Geoffrey Dyer	Richard Flanagan	Richard Flanagan	
2004	40	Craig Ruddy	David Gulpilil, two worlds	David Gulpilil	
2005	36	John Olsen	Self portrait Janus Faced	John Olsen	
2006	36	Marcus Wills	The Paul Juraszek Monolith (after Marcus Gheeraerts)	Paul Juraszek	
2007	41	John Beard	Janet Laurence	Janet Laurence	
2008	40	Del Kathryn Barton	You are what is most beautiful about me, a self portrait with Kell and Arella	Del Kathryn Barton	
2009	39	Guy Maestri	Geoffrey Gurrumul Yunupingu	Geoffrey Gurrumul Yunupingu	
2010	34	Sam Leach	Tim Minchin	Tim Minchin	
2011	41	Ben Quilty	Margaret Olley	Margaret Olley	
2012	41	Tim Storrier	The Histrionic Wayfarer (after Bosch) (Self portrait)	Tim Storrier	
2013	39	Del Kathryn Barton	hugo	Hugo Weaving	
2014	54	Fiona Lowry	Penelope Seidler	Penelope Seidler	
2015	47	Nigel Milsom	Judo house pt 6 (the white bird)	Charles Waterstreet	
2016	51	Louise Hearman	Barry	Barry Humphries	
2017	43	Mitch Cairns	Agatha Gothe-Snape	Agatha Gothe-Snape	
2018	57	Yvette Coppersmith	Self-portrait, after George Lambert	Yvette Coppersmith	
2019	51	Tony Costa	Lindy Lee	Lindy Lee	
2020	51	Vincent Namatjira	Stand Strong for Who You Are	Adam Goodes	
2021	52	Peter Wegner	Portrait of Guy Warren at 100	Guy Warren	
2022	52	Blak Douglas	Moby Dickens	Karla Dickens	
2023	57	Julia Gutman	Head in the sky, feet on the ground	Montaigne	
2024	57	Laura Jones	Tim Winton	Tim Winton	
2025	57	Julie Fragar	Flagship Mother Multiverse (Justene)	Justene Williams	
2026	59	Richard Lewer	Iluwanti Ken	Iluwanti Ken	

=== Gallery ===
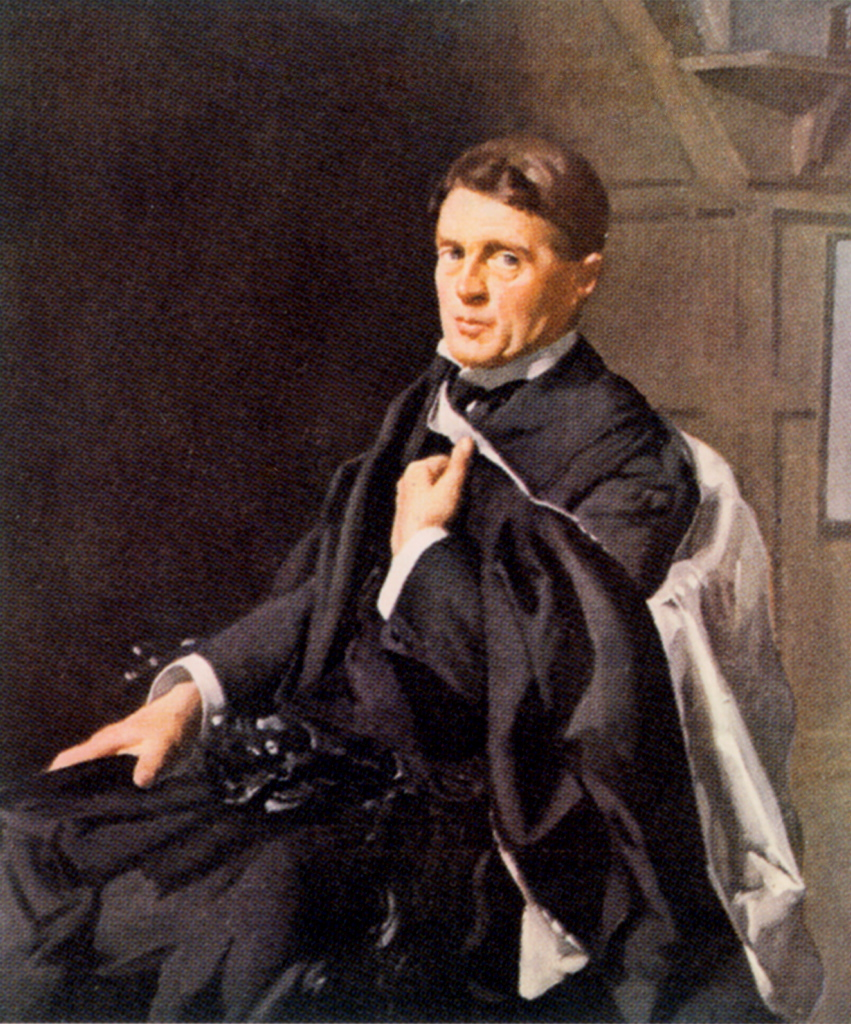
1922 (McInnes)

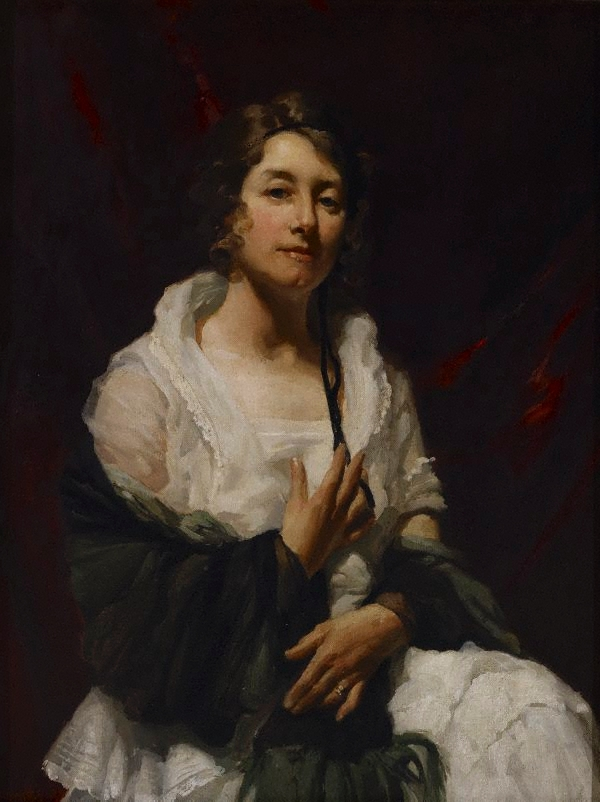
1923 (McInnes)

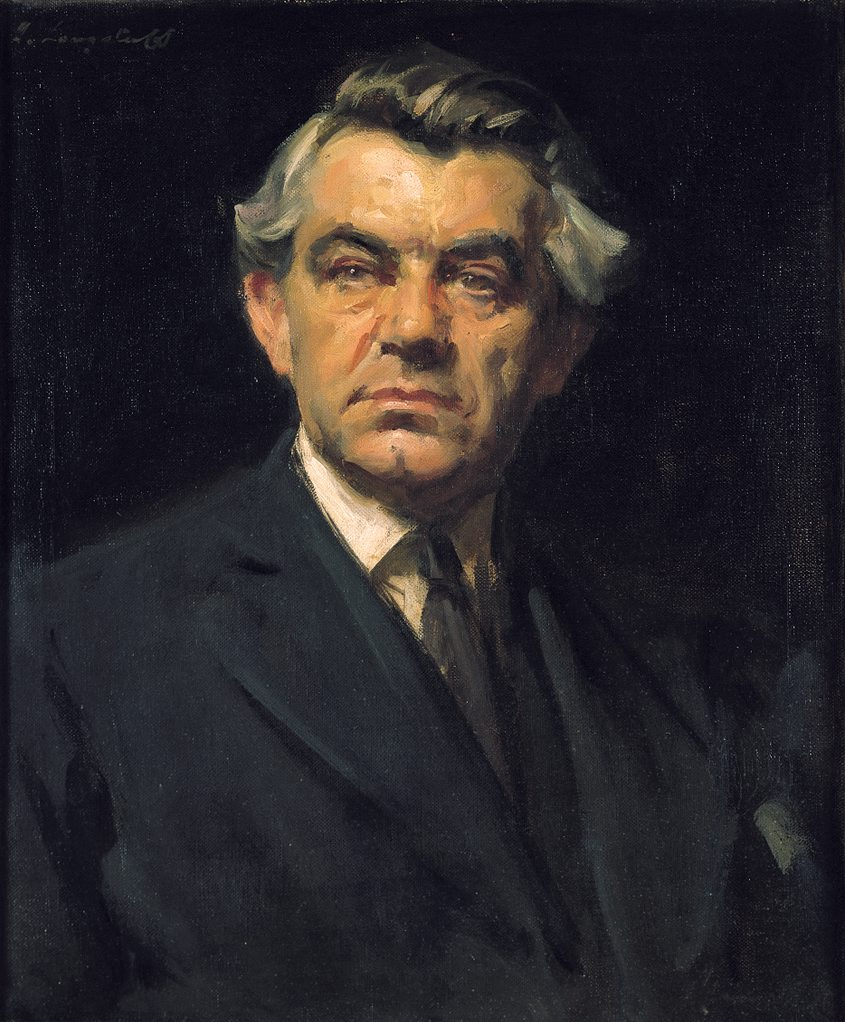
1925 (Longstaff)

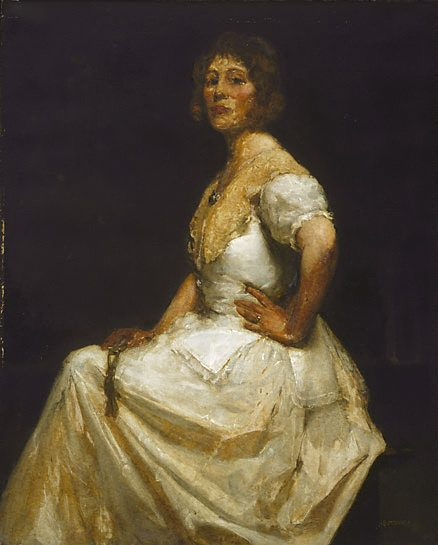
1926 (McInnes)

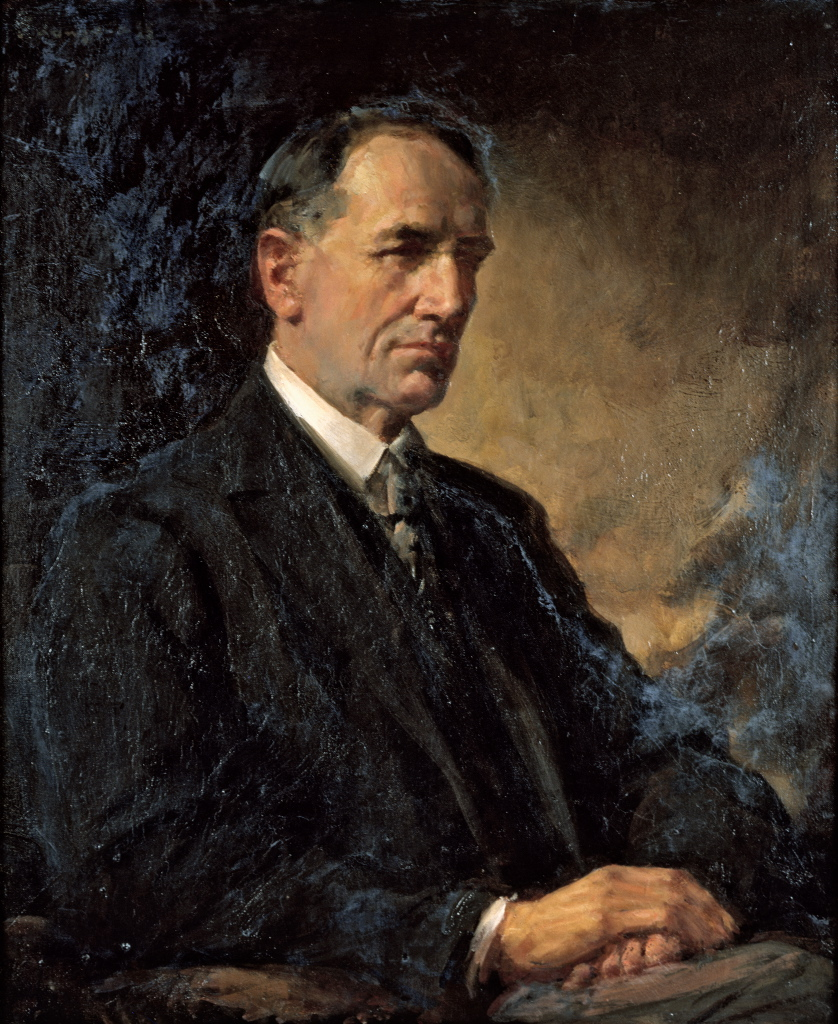
1929 (Longstaff)

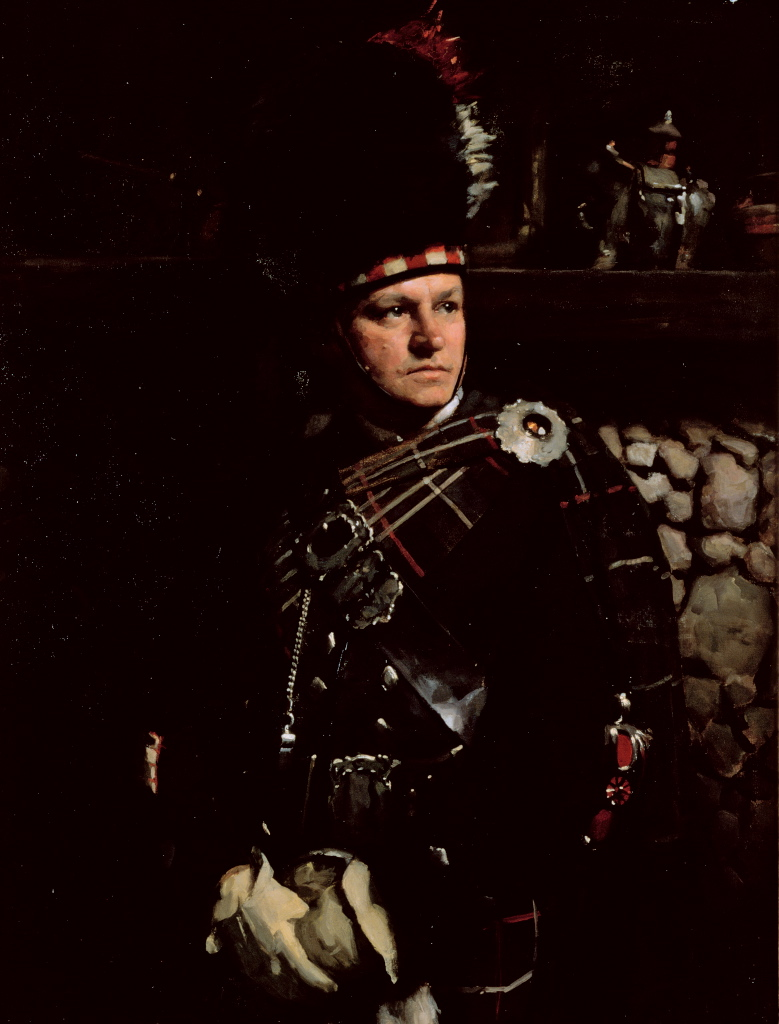
1930 (McInnes)

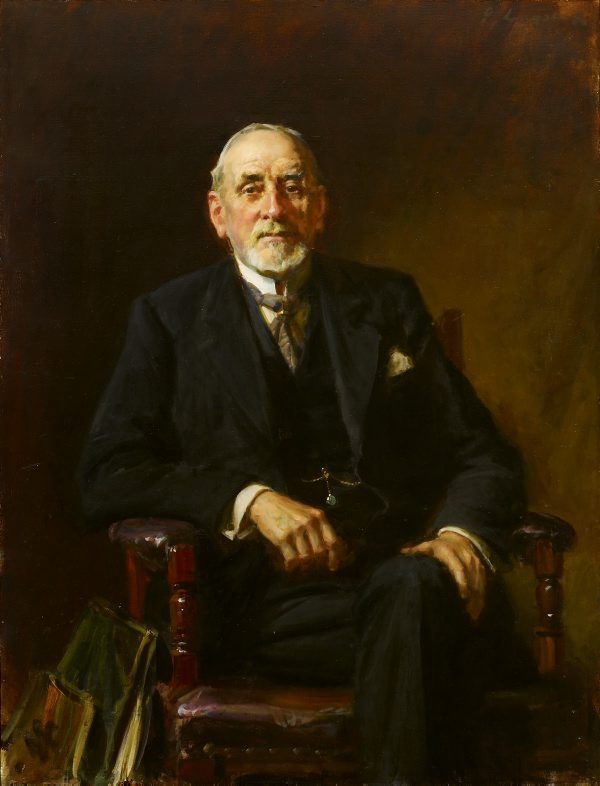
1931 (Longstaff)

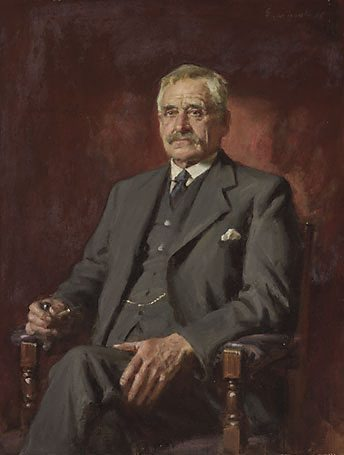
1935 (Longstaff)

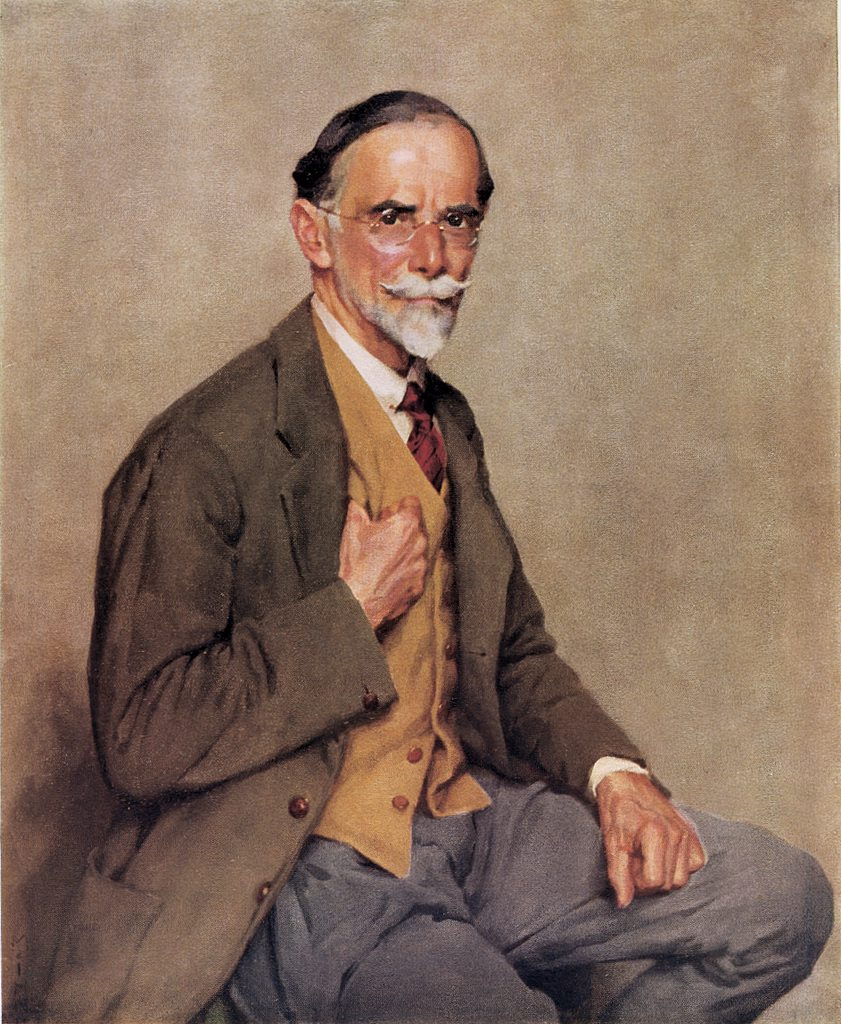
1936 (McInnes)

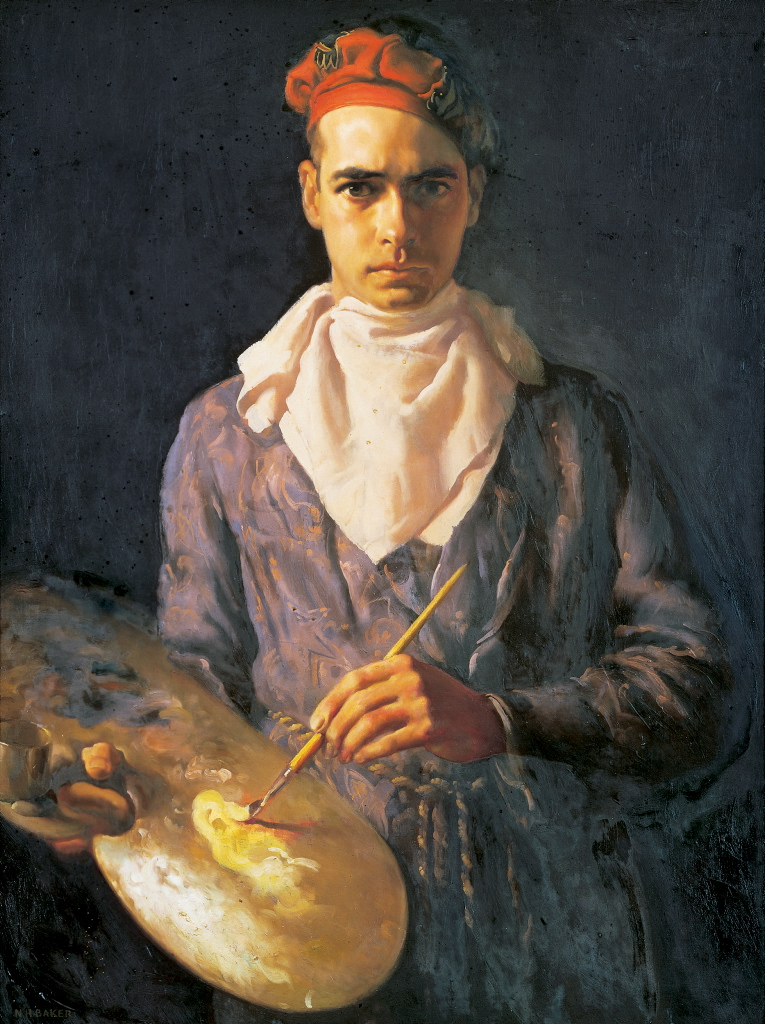
1937 (Baker)

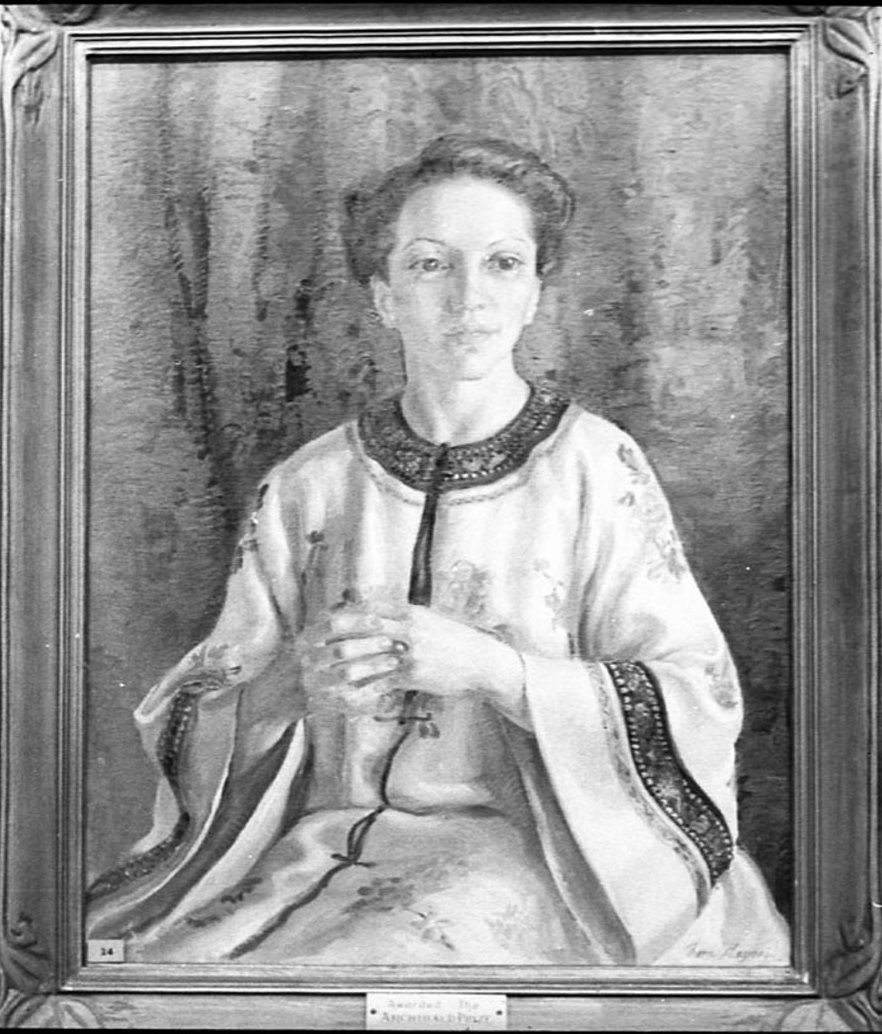
1938 (Heysen)

== Winners of the Packing Room Prize ==
Year	Artist	Title	Subject	Notes
1991/92	Greg Bridges	Gareth Evans	Gareth Evans	(not selected as a finalist)
1993	Angelika Erbsland	Colin Hayes OBE and friend	Colin Hayes	(not selected as a finalist)
1994	Peter Robertson	Kate Ceberano	Kate Ceberano	
1995	Danelle Bergstrom	Jon English	Jon English	(not selected as a finalist)
1996	Paul Newton	John Laws	John Laws	
1997	Bill Leak	Tex (Perkins)	Tex Perkins	
1998	Kerrie Lester	Self portrait as a bridesmaid	Kerrie Lester	
1999	Deny Christian	Garry McDonald	Garry McDonald	(not selected as a finalist)
2000	Bill Leak	'Are you with me': portrait of Sir Les Patterson	Sir Les Patterson	
2001	Paul Newton	Roy and HG (John Doyle and Greig Pickhaver)	Roy and HG	
2002	Jan Williamson	Jenny Morris – singer/songwriter	Jenny Morris	
2003	Jan Williamson	Rachel Ward	Rachel Ward	
2004	Evert Ploeg	Jana Wendt	Jana Wendt	
2005	Jason Benjamin	Staring down the past	Bill Hunter	
2006	Michael Mucci	A working class man	Scott Cam	
2007	Danelle Bergstrom	Take two – Jack Thompson	Jack Thompson	
2008	Martin Ball	Neil Finn	Neil Finn	
2009	Paul Jackson	Flacco's chariot	Paul Livingston	
2010	Nafisa Naomi	Glenn in black & white	Glenn A. Baker	
2011	Vincent Fantauzzo	Matt Moran	Matt Moran	
2012	Raelene Sharp	A Strength of Character	John Wood	
2013	Mathew Lynn	Tara Moss	Tara Moss	
2014	Tim Storrier	The Member, Dr Sir Leslie Colin Patterson KCB AO	Sir Les Patterson	
2015	Bruno Jean Grasswill	Michael Caton	Michael Caton	
2016	Betina Fauvel-Ogden	George Calombaris, masterchef	George Calombaris	
2017	Peter Smeeth	Lisa Wilkinson AM	Lisa Wilkinson	
2018	Jamie Preisz	Jimmy (title fight)	Jimmy Barnes	
2019	Tessa MacKay	Through the looking glass	David Wenham	
2020	Meyne Wyatt	Meyne	Meyne Wyatt	
2021	Kathrin Longhurst	Kate	Kate Ceberano	
2022	Claus Stangl		Taika Waititi	
2023	Andrea Huelin	Clown jewels	Cal Wilson	
2024	Matt Adnate	Rhythms of heritage	Baker Boy	
2025	Abdul Abdullah	No mountain high enough	Jason Phu	
2026	Sean Layh	The tragical historie of Hamlet, Prince of Denmark	Jacob Collins	

== Winners of the People's Choice Award ==
Year	Artist	Title	Subject	Notes
1988	Fred Cress	John Beard	John Stanley Beard	
1989	Vladas Meškėnas	Donald Friend 1989	Donald Friend	
1990	Reg Campbell	Self-portrait	Reg Campbell	
1991/92	Robert Hannaford	Portrait of Hugh Stretton	Hugh Stretton	
1993	Jennifer Little	Victor Sellu	Victor Sellu	
1994	Bill Leak	Malcolm Turnbull	Malcolm Turnbull	
1995	Josonia Palaitis	Bill Leak	Bill Leak	
1996	Robert Hannaford	Self-portrait	Robert Hannaford	
1997	Mathew Lynn	Jeanne Ryckmans	Jeanne Ryckmans	Highly Commended
1998	Robert Hannaford	Rolf Prince	Rolf Prince	
1999	Evert Ploeg	Deborah Mailman	Deborah Mailman	
2000	Esther Erlich	Never been better (portrait of Bill Leak)	Bill Leak	
2001	Paul Newton	Roy and HG (John Doyle and Greig Pickhaver)	Roy and HG	
2002	Jan Williamson	Jenny Morris – singer/songwriter	Jenny Morris	
2003	Dalu Zhao	'Lao Fei' Stephen FitzGerald	Stephen FitzGerald	
2004	Craig Ruddy	David Gulpilil, two worlds	David Gulpilil	
2005	Nicholas Harding	Bob's Daily Swim	Robert Dickerson	
2006	Paul Jackson	Garry McDonald 'All the world's a stage ... '	Garry McDonald	
2007	Evert Ploeg	George Ellis	George Ellis	
2008	Vincent Fantauzzo	Heath	Heath Ledger	
2009	Vincent Fantauzzo	Branson	Brandon Walters	
2010	Craig Ruddy	The Prince of Darkness – Warwick Thornton	Warwick Thornton	
2011	Adam Chang	John Coetzee	J. M. Coetzee	
2012	Jenny Sages	After Jack (Self portrait)	Jenny Sages	
2013	Vincent Fantauzzo	Love face	Asher Keddie	
2014	Vincent Fantauzzo	All that's good in me (self-portrait as son Luca)	Vincent Fantauzzo	
2015	Bruno Jean Grasswill	Michael Caton	Michael Caton	
2016	Nick Stathopoulos	Deng	Deng Adut	
2017	Anh Do	JC	Jack Charles	
2018	Anne Middleton	Guy	Guy Pearce	
2019	David Darcy	Tjuparntarri – women's business	Daisy Tjuparntarri Ward	
2020	Angus McDonald	Behrouz Boochani	Behrouz Boochani	
2021	Julia Ciccarone	The sea within	Self-portrait	
2022	Jeremy Eden	Samuel Johnson OAM	Samuel Johnson	
2023	Jaq Grantford	Through the Window	Noni Hazlehurst	
2024	Angus McDonald	Professor Marcia Langton AO	Marcia Langton	
2025	Loribelle Spirovski	Finger painting of William Barton	William Barton	

== See also ==
- Lists of Archibald Prize finalists
