= List of Archibald Prize 1927 finalists =

1927 Archibald Prize finalists

This is a list of finalists for the 1927 Archibald Prize for portraiture, listed by Artist and Title. As the images are copyright, an external link to an image has been listed where available.

Artist	Title	Subject	Notes
A. M. E. Bale	Mr William Rowell	artist (1898–1946)	view portrait
Lawson Balfour	Mr Philip H. Morton		
Minnie Bernhard Smith	Nurse S. A. Smith	Sophie Alice Smith, her sister	
Minnie Bernhard Smith	Nurse S. A. Smith	Sophie Alice Smith, her sister	
Bessie Boultbee	Portrait		
Walter Armiger Bowring	Mr C. J. D. Goldie	Charles James Goldie, Sydney Grammar School	
Walter Armiger Bowring	Mr W. Arundel Orchard		view portrait
Ernest Buckmaster	My mother		
Ernest Buckmaster	Self-portrait		
Ernest Buckmaster	Portrait in green and gold		
Norman Carter	Mr M. R. Macrae		
Norman Carter	Mr Henry Perdriau	rubber manufacturer (1845–1935)	
William Gilbert Collins	The finishing touch	Vesta Carah, his wife	
A. D. Colquhoun	Mr W. Macmahon Ball, MA		
Aileen R. Dent	Mr O. R. Snowball, MLA		
Aileen R. Dent	Mrs Ryland		
Aileen R. Dent	Professor H. F. Schraeder		
Mary Edwell-Burke	Mrs Dorothy Murray		view portrait
John Farmer	Mr Benno Scherek		
Ray S. Gower	Miss Scott-Findlay		
Ray S. Gower	Mr J. J. Gower		
Ray S. Gower	Mrs Newman		
David Grieve	Mr W. Maloney, MP		
John J. Hennessy	Dr Augustus L Kenny		
Reginald Jerrold-Nathan	Miss Goodlands		
Reginald Jerrold-Nathan	Mrs Sidney Moore		
Reginald Jerrold-Nathan	Self-portrait		
George W. Lambert	Mrs Murdoch		Winner: Archibald Prize 1927 view portrait
Julia B. Lynch	Mrs E. W. Kane		
Julia B. Lynch	Sir Charles Statham		
W. B. McInnes	Self-portrait		
W. B. McInnes	The days of real sport		
W. B. McInnes	Mrs Harold Tuxton		
W. B. McInnes	Miss Irene Vanbrugh		
W. B. McInnes	Sentiment		
Percival James Norton	Mr Sydney Long, ARE		
Percival James Norton	Rev A. H. Garnsey, MA		
William Rowell	Portrait of a lady		
Trenia Smth	Portrait		
Lyall Trindall	Miss Florence McDonald		
Lyall Trindall	Portrait		
Lyall Trindall	Miss Dorothy Atkinson		
J S Watkins	Mr George Collingridge		view portrait
J S Watkins	George Finey (artist)		
Charles Wheeler	Mrs Anketell Henderson		
Charles Wheeler	Miss Marie Burke		
Percy I. White	Rev John Danglow, MA		
Percy I. White	Sir John Monash		
Percy I. White	Mr F. T. Hickford, MA, LLB		
Percy I. White	Mr Gustave Stahel		
Percy I. White	Sir John MacFarland		
Joseph Wolinski	Mr Louis Stone		
Joseph Wolinski	Mr S. H. Smith, MA		
Joseph Wolinski	Mr E. de Lough		
Joseph Wolinski	Mr Aubrey Halloran, BA, LLB		view portrait
Joseph Wolinski	Self-portrait		

== See also ==
- Previous year: List of Archibald Prize 1926 finalists
- List of Archibald Prize winners
- Lists of Archibald Prize finalists
