= List of Archibald Prize 1990 finalists =

1990 Archibald Prize finalists

This is a list of finalists for the 1990 Archibald Prize for portraiture (listed is Artist – Title).

== Prize winners ==
The 1990 Archibald Prize winners were:

- Geoffrey Proud – Dorothy Hewett (Winner of the Archibald Prize) image
- Reg Campbell – Self-portrait (Winner of The People's Choice Award)

== Finalists ==
The finalists were:

- Davida Allen – hey, Betty – Portrait of Betty Churcher
- Marcus Beilby – Hal Missingham
- Robert Campbell Junior – Sammy Alfie Drew, local Macleay Aboriginal sporting identity (football and cricket)
- Reg Campbell – Self-portrait (Winner: The People's Choice Award)
- Judy Cassab – Portrait of Jeff Smart
- Kevin Connor – Portrait of Margaret Connor
- Fred Cress – The Working Day (Len Evans)
- Brian Dunlop – Tony Irving (artist and geometer)
- Geoffrey Dupree – Mike (Portrait of Mike Hamilton, writer and journalist)
- Steve Gorton – Leigh Johnson
- Hadyn Wilson and students of the Julian Ashton School – Portrait of Paul Delprat image
- Bill Hay – Darren Knight, Art Bookmaker
- Glenda Jones – Kaz Cooke image
- Kerrie Lester – Colleen Clifford
- Wendy Li – Eunice Gardner F.R.A.M.
- Geoffrey Lowe – Irene Bolger a drawing
- Lewis Miller – Portrait of Ray Hughes
- Mary Pace – Self-portrait image
- Geoffrey Proud – Dorothy Hewett (Winner: Archibald Prize 1990) image
- Aileen Rogers – Dr Susi Erika Phillips, Specialist in Child Development
- Jenny Sages – Adele Weiss and Benjamin
- Jenny Sands – Portrait of Alexandra Karpin
- Eric John Smith – Hector Gilliland
- David Thomas – Pain in the Art, Portrait of Claire St. Claire
- Imants Tillers – Portrait of Murray Bail 1990
- Rosemary Valadon – One flesh ll – portrait of Frances Joseph (sculptor) and son image
- David Van Nunen – Self-portrait of the artist at Litchfield Park
- Wes Walters – Kenneth Myer
- Anna Wojak – Pan Tanca
- Salvatore Zofrea – Psalm 44: after Uccello – self-portrait
- Susanne de Berenger – Margaret Fink image

== See also ==
- List of Archibald Prize winners
- Lists of Archibald Prize finalists
