= List of Archibald Prize 1995 finalists =

This is a list of finalists for the 1995 Archibald Prize for portraiture (listed is Artist – Title).

== Prize winners ==
The winners of the 1995 Archibald Prizes were:

- William Robinson – Self Portrait With Stunned Mullet (Winner: Archibald Prize 1995)
- Danelle Bergstrom – Jon English (Winner: Packing Room Prize 1995) (Image) (Note that the winner of the Packing Room Prize was not a finalist.)
- Josonia Palaitis – Bill Leak (Winner: People's Choice Award)

== Finalists ==
The finalists were:

- Judy Cassab – Charles Blackman
- Kevin Connor – Self-portrait
- Fred Cress – Self-portrait
- John Dent – Portrait of Michael Blanche
- John Edwards – Me, myself, I 1995
- Joe Furlonger – Self-portrait
- George Gittoes – General John Sanderson in Cambodia
- Robert Hannaford – Jarinyanu David Downs
- Robert Hannaford – Self-portrait
- Nicholas Harding – Portrait of Rex Irwin
- Ken Johnson – Edward Gilly
- Bill Leak – Graham Richardson
- Kerrie Lester – A Man and his music: Peter Weiss and the Australia Chamber Orchestra
- David Naseby – Les Murray
- Judith O'Conal – Amanda Garrett
- Josonia Palaitis – Bill Leak (Winner: People's Choice)
- Robert Pengilley – Maggie Shepherd at Home
- William Robinson – Self Portrait With Stunned Mullet (Winner: Archibald Prize 1995) (Image)
- Jenny Sages – Gene Sherman with Family, After Tillers, After Freud, After Watteau
- Wendy Sharpe – Self-portrait (artist menaced by cupids)
- Jiawei Shen – The artist couple: M Huang and F Yu (Image)
- Eric John Smith – Hendrik Kolenberg
- Ian Smith – Ray Hughes ignoring a Sydney view
- Rosemary Valadon – Power, Knowledge, Passion – Portrait of Blanche D'Alpuget
- Wes Walters – Leo Schofield
- Bryan Westwood – Self Portrait with Memories
- Salvatore Zofrea – The Brother-in-Law

== See also ==
- Previous year: List of Archibald Prize 1994 finalists
- Next year: List of Archibald Prize 1996 finalists
- List of Archibald Prize winners
- Lists of Archibald Prize finalists
