= List of Archibald Prize 1925 finalists =

1925 Archibald Prize finalists

This is a list of finalists for the 1925 Archibald Prize for portraiture, listed by Artist and Title. As the images are copyright, an external link to an image has been listed where available.

Artist	Title	Subject	Notes
Mary Cecil Allen	Mrs R D Elliott		
Mary Cecil Allen	Miss Alice Guest		
H B Armstrong	A M Armstrong, Esq		
James Muir Auld	Jack		
James Muir Auld	Self-portrait		
A. M. E. Bale	W Mountier Bale, Esq		
A. M. E. Bale	Miss Mollie Agnew		
Lawson Balfour	The Hon J C White, MLC		
Lawson Balfour	Portrait of a lady		
Lawson Balfour	H W Apperly, Esq		
Lawson Balfour	Portrait of a lady		
George Bell	Bernard Heinze, Esq		
George Bell	Mrs George Bell		
Bessie Boultbee	An artist		
Bessie Boultbee	Miss Mabel Barling		
James A Bowman	C J Jeffries, Esq		
Walter Armiger Bowring	Self-portrait		
Walter Armiger Bowring	Mrs W A Bowring		
Ernest Buckmaster	The artist's mother		
Ernest Buckmaster	Portrait of a lady		
Ernest Buckmaster	Mr Dosser		
Ernest Buckmaster	Mr Watts		
Ernest Buckmaster	John Shirlow (etcher)		
Norman Carter	Miss Lelia Coppola, BA		
Norman Carter	The Hon W M Hughes, PC		
Norman Carter	Sir William McMillan, KCMG		
Norman Carter	Miss Gladys Marks, BA		
Norman Carter	Alfred O'Shea (tenor singer)		
William Gilbert Collins	Miss Vesta Carah		
Antonio Dattilo-Rubbo	Miss Marie Bentivoglio		
Antonio Dattilo-Rubbo	Brigadier General T H Fiaschi		view portrait
Roi de Mestre	Miss E M Dangar		
Aileen R. Dent	Albert Edward Swanson, Esq		
Mary Edwell-Burke	A woman painter		
Ray S Gower	Mrs G F Days		
Ray S Gower	J J Gower, Esq		
John J Hennessy	Self-portrait		
Carlyle Jackson	Portrait of a Lady		
Marion Jones	Self-portrait		
Marion Jones	Sir Keith Smith		
Marion Jones	Self-portrait		
Marion Jones	Mrs Frank Hewson		
Marion Jones	A J Litchfield, Esq		
Marion Jones	Miss G. Alice Jones		
A. Elizabeth Kelly	Miss Roma Carey		
A. Elizabeth Kelly	Cecil F Kelly, Esq		
George W Lambert	A A Rankin, Esq		
George W Lambert	G J Cohen, Esq		
John Longstaff	Maurice Moscovitch		Winner: Archibald Prize 1925 view portrait
Percival James Norton	Professor Charteris LL.B		
Alfred William Pratt	Miss Eleanor Pratt		
Trenia Smith	Evan Smith, Esq		
Ethel Anna Stephens	Countess Montemerli		
R A Strath	Self-portrait		
R A Strath	S. R. P. Stevens, Esq		
R A Strath	Elma		
Jo Sweatman	Mrs Carl Hampel		
J R Thompson	Portrait		
Lyall Trindall	Portrait of a lady		
Lyall Trindall	Self-portrait		
J S Watkins	The Hon A C Willis, MLC		
J S Watkins	Miss Kathleen Witham		
J S Watkins	Mrs J S Watkins		
Charles Wheeler	Portrait		
Ada Clara Whiting	Miss Marjorie Clarke		
Ada Clara Whiting	Miss Rene Harcourt		
Ada Clara Whiting	Miss Jessica Harcourt		view portrait
Joseph Wolinski	A. Watson Munro, M.D. (a sketch)		
Joseph Wolinski	F. Antill Pockley, M.D.		
Joseph Wolinski	Self-portrait		
Joseph Wolinski	A. Watson Munro, M.D.		
A. Marriott Woodhouse	Lady with Amber Beads		
A. Marriott Woodhouse	Portrait of a Lady		
A. Marriott Woodhouse	Mrs J. R. Purdy		
A. Marriott Woodhouse	Brigadier General W. Ramsay McNicoll		

== See also ==
- Previous year: List of Archibald Prize 1924 finalists
- Next year: List of Archibald Prize 1926 finalists
- List of Archibald Prize winners
- Lists of Archibald Prize finalists
