= List of Archibald Prize 1926 finalists =

1925 Archibald Prize finalists

This is a list of finalists for the 1926 Archibald Prize for portraiture, listed by Artist and Title. As the images are copyright, an external link to an image has been listed where available.

Artist	Title	Subject	Notes
J. Adam	Portrait		
J. Adam	Portrait		
A. M. E. Bale	Philip Broinowski, Esq.		
A. M. E. Bale	Miss A. Brotherton Cherry, B.A.		
Lawson Balfour	William Slade, Esq.		
George Bell	Mrs George Bell		
Walter Armiger Bowring	Dr J. R. M. Robertson		
Walter Armiger Bowring	G. M. Merivale, Esq.		
Ernest Buckmaster	Self-portrait		
Ernest Buckmaster	Mrs Cargidy		
Norman Carter	A. J. Kilgour, Esq., MA, LLB		
William Gilbert Collins	Mrs Dando		
A. D. Colquhoun	Fritz Hart, Esq.		
Aileen R. Dent	Sir George Knibbs		
Aileen R. Dent	W. W. Killen, Esq., MHR		
Mary Edwell-Burke	Miss May Moore		
John Farmer	Mrs Warne		
Albert Henry Fullwood	Robert Bonar, Esq.		
Ray S Gower	Self-portrait		
Grace Hoy	Commandant Atkins		
Grace Hoy	Miss Brenda Oliver		
Reginald Jerrold-Nathan	Bob Waden, Esq.		
Reginald Jerrold-Nathan	Mrs Gratton		
Marion Jones	Lt Col T. F. Rutledge		
John Longstaff	A. Consett Stephen, Esq.		
John Longstaff	Sir John Grice		
John Longstaff	Lauchlan Mackinnon, Esq.		
John Longstaff	Dr W. H. Crago		
W. B. McInnes	The Hon Philip Street, Chief Justice		
W. B. McInnes	Silk and lace (Miss Esther Paterson)		Winner: Archibald Prize 1926 view portrait
W. B. McInnes	Portrait		
W. B. McInnes	Portrait		
Josephine Muntz-Adams	Study of a young girl		
Christopher Murray	Miss J. Delemere		
John Nickal	Janet		
Percival James Norton	Mrs G. Finey		
Percival James Norton	E. H. Oxnard Smith, Esq.		
C. W. Peck	Self-portrait		
Adelaide Perry	Mrs Baxter		
Adelaide Perry	Monsieur Antoine Konstant		
Russell W. Phillips	Winifred Brindley		
William Rowell	Miss A. M. E. Bale (artist)		
Unknown artist	(Title unknown)		
J S Watkins	Mrs J S Watkins		
J S Watkins	George Finey (artist)		
J S Watkins	Erik Langker (artist)		
Charles Wheeler	Portrait		
Charles Wheeler	Mrs George Benson		
Percy I. White	Lt General Sir John Monash		
Percy I. White	Miss Marie Burke		
Joseph Wolinski	Tien Hogue (Mrs Guy Wyatt)		
Joseph Wolinski	Rev. A. D. Wolinski		
Joseph Wolinski	W. A. Holman, Esq., KC		
Joseph Wolinski	T. E. Rofe, Esq.		
Joseph Wolinski	A. H. Fullwood (artist)		
A. Marriott Woodhouse	Miss Beryl Turner		
A. Marriott Woodhouse	Portrait of a Lady in Red		
A. Marriott Woodhouse	Portrait of a Lady		

== See also ==
- Previous year: List of Archibald Prize 1925 finalists
- List of Archibald Prize winners
- Lists of Archibald Prize finalists
