= List of Archibald Prize 1986 finalists =

1986 Archibald Prize finalists

This is a list of finalists for the 1986 Archibald Prize for portraiture, listed by Artist and Title. As the images are copyright, an external link to an image has been listed where available.

Artist	Title	Subject	Notes
Margaret Ackland	Beth Mayne		
Davida Allen	Dr John Arthur McKelvie Shera		Winner: Archibald Prize 1986
Naomi Berns	David Williamson (Playwright/Author)		
Jonathan Bowden	Portrait of Robert Stonjek, Unpublished Poet		
John Caldwell	John Brackenreg		
Fred Cress	David Armstrong		
William Dargie	Tony Rafty The Caricaturist		
Robert Eadie	Portrait of Alex Trompf with Pauline Webber		
David Fairbairn	Three portraits of WCF	my father	
John Gillham	Vermeer, Van Meegeren and Van den Berg: portrait of Yelle		
Leeka Gruzdeff	Rita Hunter		
Christine Hiller	Homage to Van Gogh: self-portrait with peasants		
Frank Hodgkinson	Donald Friend		
Keith Looby	John Bloomfield's Arta Eaten		
Vladas Meskenas	Desiderius Orban		
Robert Morris	Ian Smith, artist and self-portrait 1986		
Aileen Rogers	Richard Mackay		
Victor Rubin	Auto-mask		
Garry Shead	Martin Sharp		
Eric John Smith	Richard Hall, Author and Journalist		
Ian Smith	Portrait of Ray Hughes from life	with unreliable photography	
Joshua Smith	Professor Fred Rost		
Nigel Thomson	Kate Grenville	Writer/ Mother	
Wes Walters	Portrait of William J. Hughes		
Michael Winters	Urban forms, primitive forms and Jim McClelland		
Salvatore Zofrea	Eileen Chanin 1986		

== See also ==
- List of Archibald Prize winners
- Lists of Archibald Prize finalists
