= List of Archibald Prize 2004 finalists =

This is a list of finalists for the 2004 Archibald Prize for portraiture (listed is Artist – Title).

- Richard Bell – I am not sorry – (self-portrait)
- Jason Benjamin – Bread & circuses – (John Olsen) (Image)
- Danelle Bergstrom – Franco Belgiorno-Nettis – 'larger than life'
- David Bromley – McLean & friends
- Ann Cape – Figure within the landscape: Guy Warren OAM
- Tom Carment – Euan Macleod
- Kevin Connor – Paul Connor – architect
- Michael Conole – Ricky Swallow 2004
- Adam Cullen – Margaret Throsby
- Brian Dunlop – Brian Kenna: imagines Urfa
- Gillian Dunlop – Lucy Culliton
- Geoffrey Dyer – Graeme Murphy
- McLean Edwards – Martin Browne art dealer
- Joe Furlonger – Peter Hallinan, Tribal arts dealer (retired) & mountain bike racer
- Robert Hannaford – Self portrait
- Nicholas Harding – Studio visit: Rusty drops by with Blade & Tony 2002–04
- Paul Jackson – Self portrait with the last Huia
- Peter Kendall – Peter Brock
- Kerrie Lester – Garry Shead, Freckles and Max
- Mathew Lynn – Pat O'Shane
- Gabrielle Martin – Tony Clark with Jasperware (landscape)
- Carolyn McKay Creecy – Bruce Spence
- Lewis Miller – Self portrait III
- Henry Mulholland – Nick Meyers
- Paul Newton – Self portrait
- David Paulson – Richard Bell, ‘I am not sorry’
- Evert Ploeg – Jana Wendt (Winner of the Packing Room Prize)
- Rodney Pople – Self portrait after Henry Raeburn
- Paul Procèe – Tim Hall (from the faces series)
- Ben Quilty – Whytie
- Craig Ruddy – David Gulpilil, two worlds (Winner of the Archibald Prize and the People's Choice Award)
- Paul Ryan – Self portrait, Bulli Beach
- Jenny Sages – Seeing the lights – Anthony Hopkins artist
- Jiawei Shen – Tom Hughes
- Pamela Tippett – Self portrait
- Henny Van den Wildenberg – The storyteller – Mem Fox
- Peter Wegner – Portrait of Jacques Reymond
- Paul Worstead – Me
- Michael Zavros – Portrait of Stephen Mori, with Win Schubert and my Greater Kudu
- Dalu Zhao – Life of stage – John Clarke

== See also ==
- Previous year: List of Archibald Prize 2003 finalists
- Next year: List of Archibald Prize 2005 finalists
- List of Archibald Prize winners
