= List of Archibald Prize 1973 finalists =

1973 Archibald Prize finalists

This is a list of finalists for the 1973 Archibald Prize for portraiture, listed by Artist and Title. As the images are copyright, an external link to an image has been listed where available.

Artist	Title	Subject	Notes
Ian Armstrong	Max Charlesworth		
Coralie Barr	Ethel Hayton, journalist		
William Geoffrey Boissevain	Rose Skinner		
Shirley Bourne	Professor A. D. Hope		
Charles Bush	Barry Jones, MLA		
Jo Caddy	Chris Coventry		
Peter James Campbell	George Baldessin		
Reg Campbell	John Kelly		
Judy Cassab	Portrait of Olsen		
Judy Cassab	Portrait of Orban		
Peter Chapman	Laura		
Kevin Connor	Albert Tucker		
Janet Dawson	Michael Boddy		Winner: Archibald Prize 1973
Joan Dent	James Maxwell		
Gundars Eglentals	Lionel Long		
Maximilian Feuerring	Self-portrait		
Helen French-Kennedy	A J Grassby		
Don Gallagher	Gaye McDermott		
Edna Garran-Brown	Joanne Thew		
Penelope Gilbert	Mr Michael Somare, Chief Minister of Papua New Guinea		
Allan Hansen	Self-portrait		
Newton Hedstrom	Self-portrait		
John Henshaw	Frank Hinder		
Nora Heysen	Hottie Lahm		
Graeme Inson	Alderman Sir Emmett McDermott as Lord Mayor of Sydney		
Graeme Inson	B. H. Travers, O.B.E., B.A.(Syd.), M.A., B.Litt.(Oxon.)		
Jean Isherwood	Roy Fluke		
Louis Kahan	Professor Harry Messel		
Robert Lassau	"Ma Craydon o' the Rocks"		
Lynette Lee	Sheila Raphael		
Vaike Liibus	Stan de Teliga		
Vaike Liibus	The Hon Sir Percy Spender, KEVO, KBE, Kt StJ, QC		
Lance McNeill	Graham Perkin, Editor-in-Chief, "The Age" Newspaper, Melbourne		
John V. Maudson	John Hannes		
Jocelyn Maughan	Dr Hastings Willis		
Vladas Meskenas	Elwyn Lynn		
Robin Norling	Husband and wipe		
Edwa Owen	Mrs. Estelle Wakelin		
L. Scott Pendlebury	Max Jost		
James Grainger Phillips	Unk White		
Lesley Pockley	Hugh Paget, O.B.E., M.A. (Oxon.)		
Ralph Podolski	Mr. J.W. Mcmillan, B.Sc., B.Ed., M.Eng.Sc., M.A., Registrar, The New South Wales Institute of Technology		
Clifton Pugh	Playwright David Williamson		
John Thomas Rigby	Lady Cilento (Medical mother)		
Thea Rutledge	Portrait of Jack Pritchett, past Commodore, Royal Prince Alfred Yacht Club		
Andrew Sibley	Rodney Hall		
Eric John Smith	Rudy Komon, OBE		
Eric John Smith	Patrick White		
Joshua Smith	Ian F. Potts, F.R.C.S.		
Sylvia Tiarks	Self-portrait		
Loola Uannw	William Anderson		
Richard Zmija	Self-portrait		
Reinis Zusters	Rolf Harris		

== See also ==
- List of Archibald Prize winners
- Lists of Archibald Prize finalists
