= List of Archibald Prize 1921 finalists =

This is a list of finalists for the 1921 Archibald Prize for portraiture. (listed is Artist – Title) As the images are copyright, an external link to an image has been listed where available.

Artist	Title	Subject	Notes
Mary Cecil Allen	Portrait		
Herbert Beecroft	Miniature		
George Bell	Portrait		
Norman Carter	Hon W A Holman		
Norman Carter	Elioth Gruner		
Norman Carter	Self portrait	Norman Carter	
Aileen R Dent	Portrait		
Mary Edwell-Burke	Portrait		
Lindsay Bernard Hall	Portrait		
Clewin Harcourt	Portrait		
G F Harris	Portrait		
Harry Bromilow Harrison	W. P. Hurst		
Polly Hurry	Portrait		
F Latimer	Portrait		
Stanley Lloyd	Portrait		
William Macleod	Portrait		
R J McFadden	Rt Hon A Fisher		
W B McInnes	Desbrowe Annear	Desbrowe Annear	(Winner: Archibald Prize 1921)
W B McInnes	Mother and Son		
Max Meldrum	Self portrait	Max Meldrum	
Benjamin Edwin Minns	Portrait		
Florence Aline Rodway	Sir Wm Cullen		
Florence Aline Rodway	J F Archibald	J F Archibald	
Unknown artist	Lloyd George		
Unknown artist	A Brisbane musician		
Unknown artist	Portrait of a professor		
Unknown artist	Portrait of a poet		
Unknown artist	[Twelve untraced Portraits] 1/12		
Unknown artist	[Twelve untraced Portraits] 2/12		
Unknown artist	[Twelve untraced Portraits] 3/12		
Unknown artist	[Twelve untraced Portraits] 4/12		
Unknown artist	[Twelve untraced Portraits] 5/12		
Unknown artist	[Twelve untraced Portraits] 6/12		
Unknown artist	[Twelve untraced Portraits] 7/12		
Unknown artist	[Twelve untraced Portraits] 8/12		
Unknown artist	[Twelve untraced Portraits] 9/12		
Unknown artist	[Twelve untraced Portraits] 10/12		
Unknown artist	[Twelve untraced Portraits] 11/12		
Unknown artist	[Twelve untraced Portraits] 12/12		
J S Watkins	Portrait		
Joseph Wolinski	Portrait of Rabbi Cohen		
Joseph Wolinski	Portrait of my Father		
A Marriott Woodhouse	Portrait of my Mother		

== See also ==
- Next year: List of Archibald Prize 1922 finalists
- List of Archibald Prize winners
- Lists of Archibald Prize finalists
