= Lists of Archibald Prize finalists =

The page List of Archibald Prize winners provides a summary of Archibald Prize winners.
This page provides directions to Lists of finalists of the annual Australian Archibald Prize for portraiture.

== Lists of finalists ==
- 1920s
  - List of Archibald Prize 1921 finalists
  - List of Archibald Prize 1922 finalists
  - List of Archibald Prize 1923 finalists
  - List of Archibald Prize 1924 finalists
  - List of Archibald Prize 1925 finalists
  - List of Archibald Prize 1926 finalists
- 1930s
  - List of Archibald Prize 1938 finalists
  - List of Archibald Prize 1939 finalists
- 1940s
  - List of Archibald Prize 1946 finalists
- 1950s
- 1960s
  - List of Archibald Prize 1960 finalists
  - List of Archibald Prize 1966 finalists
- 1970s
  - List of Archibald Prize 1973 finalists
- 1980s
  - List of Archibald Prize 1986 finalists
- 1990s
  - List of Archibald Prize 1990 finalists
  - List of Archibald Prize 1991/92 finalists
  - List of Archibald Prize 1993 finalists
  - List of Archibald Prize 1994 finalists
  - List of Archibald Prize 1995 finalists
  - List of Archibald Prize 1996 finalists
  - List of Archibald Prize 1997 finalists
  - List of Archibald Prize 1998 finalists
  - List of Archibald Prize 1999 finalists
- 2000s
  - List of Archibald Prize 2000 finalists
  - List of Archibald Prize 2001 finalists
  - List of Archibald Prize 2002 finalists
  - List of Archibald Prize 2003 finalists
  - List of Archibald Prize 2004 finalists
  - List of Archibald Prize 2005 finalists
  - List of Archibald Prize 2006 finalists
  - List of Archibald Prize 2007 finalists
  - List of Archibald Prize 2008 finalists
  - List of Archibald Prize 2009 finalists
- 2010s
  - List of Archibald Prize 2010 finalists
  - List of Archibald Prize 2011 finalists
  - List of Archibald Prize 2012 finalists
  - List of Archibald Prize 2013 finalists
  - List of Archibald Prize 2014 finalists
  - List of Archibald Prize 2015 finalists
  - List of Archibald Prize 2016 finalists
  - List of Archibald Prize 2017 finalists
  - List of Archibald Prize 2018 finalists
  - List of Archibald Prize 2019 finalists
- 2020s
  - List of Archibald Prize 2020 finalists
  - List of Archibald Prize 2021 finalists
  - List of Archibald Prize 2022 finalists
  - List of Archibald Prize 2023 finalists
  - List of Archibald Prize 2024 finalists
  - List of Archibald Prize 2025 finalists
  - List of Archibald Prize 2026 finalists

== Notable Archibald artists ==
There is a number of artists who have been judged finalists more than twenty times. (Many of these have never won the main prize.) These include:

- Bill Leak
- Keith Looby
- Robert Hannaford
- L. Scott Pendlebury
- Jenny Sages

== Subjects ==
Besides the winners, there have been many hundreds of Archibald finalists featuring portraits of Australian celebrities, including musicians, athletes, politicians, film-makers and artists. The below is not an exhaustive list: (listed Artist – Subject)

1949

- Harold Thornton –Roy Rene

1979

- Lance Bressow – Dame Joan Sutherland
- Josonia Palaitis – The Honourable John Howard, M.P.
- L. Scott Pendlebury – Anne and Drew Pendlebury (Actress and Musician respectively)

1980

- Charles William Bush – Sir John Kerr

1981

- William Dargie – Joh Bjelke-Petersen

1982

- Harold Thornton – Dr Brown and Green Old Time Waltz (Bob Brown)
- Rex Dupain – Max's Muse (Max Dupain)
- Geoff La Gerche – Patrick White
- Ted Markstein – The Great White Hope in the Land of the Blind (Patrick White)

1983

- Wesley Walters – Molly

1984

- Keith Looby – Max Gillies
- Wesley Walters – Portrait of Colleen McCullough

1985

- Susan Rothwell – Peter Weir

1986

- Naomi Berns – David Williamson
- Fred Cress – David Armstrong

1987

- Keith Looby – Manning Clark

1988

- Leeka Gruzdeff – Don Burrows
- Sidney Nolan – Arthur Boyd at Fitzroy Falls

1989

- Tim Harris – The Doug Anthony All Stars with the Risen Elvis
- Bernd Heinrich – Thomas Keneally
- Bill Leak – Sir Donald Bradman
- Brett Whiteley – Portrait of Francis Bacon

1990

- Glenda Jones – Kaz Cooke

1991/1992

- Vladas Meskenas – Dr Victor Chang
- Rosemary Valadon – The Long Afternoon – Portrait of Dr Germaine Greer

Lists of finalists
| 1920s | 1930s | 1940s | 1950s | 1960s | 1970s | 1980s | 1990s | 2000s | 2010s | 2020s |
|---|---|---|---|---|---|---|---|---|---|---|
| 1921; 1922; 1923; 1924; 1925; 1926; 1927; 1928; 1929 | 1930; 1931; 1932; 1933; 1934; 1935; 1936; 1937; 1938; 1939 | 1940; 1941; 1942; 1943; 1944; 1945; 1946; 1947; 1948; 1949 | 1950; 1951; 1952; 1953; 1954; 1955; 1956; 1957; 1958; 1959 | 1960; 1961; 1962; 1963; 1964; 1965; 1966; 1967; 1968; 1969 | 1970; 1971; 1972; 1973; 1974; 1975; 1976; 1977; 1978; 1979 | 1980; 1981; 1982; 1983; 1984; 1985; 1986; 1987; 1988; 1989 | 1990; 1991/92; 1993; 1994; 1995; 1996; 1997; 1998; 1999 | 2000; 2001; 2002; 2003; 2004; 2005; 2006; 2007; 2008; 2009 | 2010; 2011; 2012; 2013; 2014; 2015; 2016; 2017; 2018; 2019 | 2020; 2021; 2022 |
