= Cyril Steele =

Australian rules footballer

Personal information
- Full name: Henry Cyril Augustus Steele
- Born: 11 June 1891; Auburn, Victoria
- Died: 18 January 1939 (aged 47); Werribee River
- Original team: Melbourne Grammar School

Playing career^{1}
Years	Club	Games (Goals)
1910	Melbourne	3 (0)
1914	University	1 (0)
Total		4 (0)
- ^{1} Playing statistics correct to the end of 1914.

Henry Cyril Augustus Steele (11 June 1891 – 18 January 1939), commonly known as Cyril Steele, was an Australian rules footballer who played with University and Melbourne in the Victorian Football League (VFL). His football career was cut short by the declaration of World War I, as he was sent to the Western Front with his three brothers: Frederick Wilberforce Alexander Steele, Philip John Rupert Steele and Norman Leslie Steele.

After his brothers were killed in action, he was sent home. Steele worked as a warehouseman and, after the war, he started his own company, Steele and Co. Pty. Ltd., which he was the managing director of. In 1938, he was elected to the Melbourne Chamber of Commerce.

He was an art collector and patron of the arts. In the 1930s he paid for two study tours to Europe for the Australian artist Ernest Buckmaster. In return, he was given first choice of paintings made by Buckmaster during those trips.

On 20 January 1939, Steele and his chauffeur, Alfred Jackson, were declared missing after the boat they were on "was apparently blown out to sea". A search was held, but his body was not recovered until four days later, on 24 January 1939. He was survived by his wife and children, to whom he left his £141,460 estate.
