= Frances Joseph =

Australian-born New Zealand sculptor and academic

Academic background
- Education: University of Tasmania; University of New South Wales
- Alma mater: Auckland University of Technology

Frances Joseph is an Australian-born sculptor and academic. She is a full professor at Auckland University of Technology.

== Academic career ==
Joseph has a BA in visual art from the University of Tasmania and a Master of Fine Art from the College of Fine Arts at the University of New South Wales. She was awarded a PhD by Auckland University of Technology in 2010. The title of her doctoral thesis was Mnemotechne of design — ontology and design research theories. Joseph moved to New Zealand in 1997, working in the School of Art and Design. In 2007 she became director of AUT's Textile and Design Lab and in 2009 director of CoLab. She was appointed a full professor at the Auckland University of Technology in November 2018.

== Selected works ==
- Kasabov, Nikola; Vishal Jain; Paulo C.M. Gottgtroy; Lubica Benuskova; Joseph, Frances (December 2006), Brain-Gene Ontology: Integrating Bioinformatics and Neuroinformatics Data, Information and Knowledge to Enable Discoveries, Institute of Electrical and Electronics Engineers, doi:10.1109/his.2006.264896, Wikidata Q60502825
- Nik Kasabov; Vishal Jain; Lubica Benuskova; Paulo C. M. Gottgtroy; Joseph, Frances (2008). "Integration of Brain-Gene Ontology and Simulation Systems for Learning, Modelling and Discovery". Studies in Computational Intelligence: 221–234. doi:10.1007/978-3-540-75767-2_11. Wikidata Q60502769.
- Ruth McLaren; Joseph, Frances; Craig Baguley; Taylor, Denise (2016). "A review of e-textiles in neurological rehabilitation: How close are we?". Journal of NeuroEngineering and Rehabilitation. 13 (1): 59. doi:10.1186/s12984-016-0167-0. PMC 4915040. PMID 27329186. Wikidata Q26744098.
- Lin, Xiaoyou; Seet, Boon-Chong; Joseph, Frances; Li, Erfeng (July 2018). "Flexible Fractal Electromagnetic Bandgap for Millimeter-Wave Wearable Antennas". IEEE Antennas and Wireless Propagation Letters. 17 (7): 1281–1285. Bibcode:2018IAWPL..17.1281L. doi:10.1109/LAWP.2018.2842109. ISSN 1536-1225. S2CID 49573990.
- Smitheram, Miranda; Joseph, Frances (1 October 2020). "Material-aesthetic collaborations: making-with the ecosystem". CoDesign. 16 (4): 293–310. doi:10.1080/15710882.2020.1841796. ISSN 1571-0882. S2CID 227230031.

== Personal ==
A portrait of Joseph and her son by Rosemary Valadon was selected as a finalist for the 1990 Archibald Prize and won the Portia Geach Memorial Award the following year.
