= List of Archibald Prize 2023 finalists =

This is a list of finalists for the 2023 Archibald Prize for portraiture (listed as Artist – Title). Of the 949 entries received for the Archibald Prize, 57 artworks were selected as finalists. As the images are copyrighted, a link to each image is available through its reference.

- Abdul Abdullah – Self-portrait after MD 2
- Matt Adnate – Echoes of a teenage superstar
- Jill Ansell – Looking east
- Natasha Bieniek – Self-portrait, after Nora Heysen
- Alanah Ellen Brand – Solomon Kammer: never enough
- Angela Brennan – Portrait of Erik Jensen
- Keith Burt – Sam Leach in his studio chair
- Mitch Cairns – Elizabeth Pulie
- Melissa Clements – In the driveway, 40°
- Yvette Coppersmith – Lady Primrose Potter AC
- Luke Cornish – Barrambiyarra (Awaken) (Yvonne Weldon)
- Emily Crockford – Jeff’s pink daisy eyelash clash
- Cameron Dimopoulos – Limbo
- Anh Do – Seeing Ruby (Archie Roach)
- David Fenoglio – Christopher Bassi
- Eliza Gosse – Breakfast at ours
- Jaq Grantford – Through the window (Noni Hazlehurst) (Winner: People's Choice Award 2023)
- David Griggs – The melanoma and the stitches
- Julia Gutman – Head in the sky, feet on the ground (Winner: Archibald Prize 2023)
- Tsering Hannaford – Nanna Mara
- Katherine Hattam – The nightingale and the kookaburra – portrait of Drusilla Modjeska
- John Hillier – There’s something about Harry (Harry Garside)
- Michelle Hiscock – The songwriter
- Andrea Huelin – Clown jewels (Cal Wilson) (Winner: Packing Room Prize 2023)
- Laura Jones – Claudia (the GOAT) (Claudia Karvan)
- Jason Jowett – Alex Greenwich
- Daniel Kim – Self-portrait, holding memories, my mentor Greg Warburton
- Kim Leutwyler – Zoe (Zoe Terakes)
- Sarah McCloskey – Social distancing
- Catherine McGuiness – Lucky (Kylie Kwong)
- William Mackinnon – Rich Lewer, friend and rival in sport and art
- Marie Mansfield – Ronni Kahn AO (founder OzHarvest)
- Danie Mellor – A portrait of intimacy (Gene Sherman)
- Lewis Miller – Self-portrait
- Charles Mouyat – As below, so above (ut infra, sic supra) (Michelle Simmons)
- Paul Newton – Portrait of John Symond
- Jason Phu – cameras are the best, cameras are the worst
- James Powditch – Sam I Am (Sam Neill)
- Ryan Presley – Blood money – infinite dollar note – Aunty Regina Pilawuk Wilson
- Thom Roberts – In the future there might be new tall buildings built by Bert (Farhad Haidari)
- Charlotte Ruth – Painting with toothbrush
- Sally Ryan – Year of the Rabbit (Claudia Chan Shaw)
- Marikit Santiago – Hallowed Be Thy Name (collaboration with Maella Santiago, Santi Mateo Santiago and Sarita Santiago)
- Kirthana Selvaraj – Ramesh and the blue figure with snake
- Oliver Shepherd – Maestro (portrait of Jessica Cottis)
- Michael Simms – Zaachariaha Fielding
- Judith Sinnamon – Katharine Murphy
- Randall Sinnamon – Portrait of Joseph Tawadros
- Clare Thackway – Lottie
- Natasha Walsh – Dear Ben, ‘The scream’ (after Pope Innocent X)
- Oliver Watts – Heidi May, Elle Charalambu and the artist at Redleaf Pool
- Kaylene Whiskey – Cooking my famous Indulkana soup
- Marcus Wills – Jack and Nikki
- Patrice Wills – No place like home
- Shevaun Wright, Sophia Hewson (aka Dirty talk) – Atong (Atong Atem)
- Tiger Yaltangki – Ngayulu munu papa kutjara (Me with two dogs)
- Zoe Young – Latrell and Winmarra (Latrell Mitchell)
