= William Robinson (Australian painter) =

Australian artist (1936–2025)

William Francis Robinson AO (16 April 1936 – 26 August 2025) was an Australian painter and lithographer.

== Early life ==
William Robinson was born in Brisbane on 16 April 1936. He attended Brisbane State High School and Ballarat High School. After graduating from secondary education, he began training as a teacher in 1953 and then as a visual arts teacher.

During his teaching career, Robinson became head of the Painting Department at the Brisbane College of Advanced Education in 1982. In 1989 he retired to work full-time on his paintings.

== Artistic career ==
Robinson held his first solo exhibition at the Design Arts Centre, Brisbane in 1967. He rose to international prominence as a part of the exhibitions Australian Perspecta in 1983 and The Sixth Bienniale of Sydney in 1986.

The Metropolitan Museum of Art has several of his works in their collection, as does the National Gallery of Australia, the Art Gallery of Western Australia and several smaller Australian galleries.

He has won the Archibald Prize for portraiture twice: first in 1987 for Equestrian self portrait, then in 1995 for Self-portrait with stunned mullet. He has also won the Wynne Prize for landscape painting in 1990 (The rainforest) and 1996 (Creation landscape – earth and sea).

Robinson released a solo exhibition, Landscapes, which consisted of oil paintings showing fragments of the Australian bush in various perspectives.

In 2009, The William Robinson Gallery was opened at Old Government House, Brisbane, part of Queensland University of Technology. Robinson was the subject of a documentary by filmmaker Catherine Hunter. "William Robinson: A Painter’s Journey" traces the places that have inspired the artist, from his early farmyard paintings to the 'Creation Landscape' series and the quiet still life paintings inspired by the intimate surroundings of his Brisbane house and garden.

In 2011, The Queensland University of Technology (QUT) Art Museum curated a major retrospective exhibition William Robinson: The Transfigured Landscape which was opened by then-Australian Governor General Quentin Bryce. There is an art gallery within Old Government House on the QUT's Garden Point campus devoted to Robinson's art, featuring many of his artworks, including some of his very first.

The monograph William Robinson: The Transfigured Landscape was published by Piper Press with QUT in 2011 to coincide with the exhibition of the same name, and included essays by notable scholars and curators Deborah Hart, David Malouf, Desmond MacAulay and Bettina MacAulay, Hannah Fink and Michael Brand. He was a two-time winner of both the Archibald Portrait Prize and the Wynne Prize for landscapes.

In 2016, Robinson was interviewed in a digital story and oral history for State Library of Queensland's James C Sourris AM Collection. In the interview Robinson talks to Vanessa Van Ooyen, Director of the QUT Art Museum about his art, his success at winning the Archibald Prize and his busy life as both a teacher and an artist.

== Death ==
Robinson died on 26 August 2025, at the age of 89.

Awards
| Preceded by Davida Allen | Archibald Prize; 1987 for Equestrian Self Portrait | Succeeded by Fred Cress |
| Preceded by Francis Giacco | Archibald Prize; 1995 for Self Portrait with Stunned Mullet | Succeeded by Wendy Sharpe |
