= Geoffrey Dyer =

Australian artist (1947–2020)

Geoffrey Dyer (1947 – 7 October 2020) was an Australian artist. He was born and died in Hobart, Tasmania.

== Career ==
He won the Archibald Prize in 2003 with a portrait of Richard Flanagan.

He was a finalist of the 2011 Archibald Prize.

Steven Joyce of Hobart's Despard Gallery announced Dyer's death via social media on Thursday 8 October 2020 at age 73.

Awards
| Preceded by Cherry Hood | Archibald Prize; 2003 for Richard Flanagan | Succeeded by Craig Ruddy |
