= Vincent Fantauzzo =

Australian painter (born 1977)

Vincent Fantauzzo (born 1977) is an Australian portrait artist. He is known for his award-winning portraits of Heath Ledger, Brandon Walters, Matt Moran, Emma Hack, Baz Luhrmann, and his wife Asher Keddie. He has won the Doug Moran National Portrait Prize twice, the Archibald Packing Room Prize, and the Archibald People's Choice Award four times.

== Early life and education ==
Vincent Fantauzzo was born in Manchester, England in 1977. His family migrated to Australia when he was a child.

He has a Bachelor of Fine Art (Painting) (2003) and a Master of Fine Art (2005) from RMIT University in Melbourne.

== Career ==
Fantauzzo is known for his photorealistic style.

Fantauzzo has had solo exhibitions at Dianne Tanzer Gallery in Melbourne in 2007 and 2008 and in Mumbai India in 2007. He won the 2003 Tolarno RMIT Partnership Prize and was a finalist in the 2007 Shirley Hannan Portrait Prize, City of Darebin La Trobe University Acquisitive Art Prize (DLAP), Whyalla Art Award, and Duke Gold Coast Art Prize.

In 2008 he was awarded an artist's residency at Chancery Lane Gallery in Hong Kong where he had a solo exhibition. He has also had solo exhibitions at the L. A. Art Fair and at Sydney's Boutwell Draper Gallery, which coincided with the opening of the Archibald. He was a finalist in 2008's Metro 5 Art Award, and Duke Gold Coast Art Prize.

Fantauzzo was chosen to paint the official portrait of former Labor Prime Minister Julia Gillard in 2017. The portrait was unveiled in Parliament House, Canberra, on 24 October 2018.

Melbourne City Council removed Fantauzzo's painting of a lane's road surface in warped black and white chequered squares in 2017 because of safety concerns. Art critic for The Australian, Christopher Allen, wrote that Fantauzzo's photorealistic style is to painting what lip-syncing is to singing. Allen described the portrait of Keddie in 2013 as "an elaborate oil rendition of a photograph that trivialises the art of painting and that of photography, as well as apparently contravening the rules of the exhibition." (Archibald submissions must be produced from life.)

== Selected works ==
- 2008 Heath – (Heath Ledger) Archibald People's Choice
- 2009 Brandon – (Brandon Walters) Archibald People's Choice
- 2011 Matt Moran – Archibald Packing Room Prize
- 2011 Baz Luhrmann "Off Screen" – Doug Moran National Portrait Prize
- 2013 Love Face – (Asher Keddie) Archibald People's Choice
- 2014 All that's good in me – (self-portrait as son Luca) Archibald People's Choice
- 2021 Muse – (Asher Keddie) Doug Moran National Portrait Prize (joint winner)

Fantauzzo published his memoir, Unveiled, in 2025.

== Personal life ==
Fantauzzo has a son with his first wife, Michelle.

Fantauzzo met actor Asher Keddie in 2012 after both had separated from their spouses. His 2012 portrait of Keddie won the People's Choice Award at the 2013 Archibald Prize. They married in April 2014 and Keddie bore a son the following year.
