= Julia Lynch =

New Zealand portrait artist

Julia Bridget Lynch (1896–1975) was a New Zealand portrait artist. In 1924 she joined the order of the Sisters of Mercy in Wellington and became Sister Mary Lawrence.

== Biography ==
Lynch was born in Manawatu province. She studied art in Palmerston North and then at Slade School of Fine Art in London from 1921 to 1923. While there she was awarded a gold medal in portraiture, the first New Zealander to receive such an award. She entered portraits in the Archibald Prize in 1927, 1949 and 1960.

In 1924 she returned to New Zealand and joined the order of the Sisters of Mercy in Wellington. She became Sister Mary Lawrence and spent the remainder of her career teaching art at St Mary's College.

In 1975 Lynch's portrait Polish Dancer won the Kelliher Art Prize.

Lynch painted a number of prominent New Zealanders' portraits, including Jean Batten, Norman Kirk and Sir Arthur Porritt.
