= Brian Dunlop =

Australian painter

Brian Dunlop (1938–2009) was an Australian still life and figurative painter

== Life ==
He was born in Sydney, Australia. He won the Sulman Prize in 1980 for The Old Physics Building (genre painting). He was a finalist in the 2004 Archibald Prize with Brian Kenna: imagines Urfa. Dunlop painted in Sydney and Ebenezer in New South Wales and in Tuscany, Rome, Skyros, Mallorca, Morocco and India. He painted portraits of public figures, including Queen Elizabeth II in 1984 for the 150th anniversary of the founding of Victoria. Dunlop settled in Panton Hill and then Port Fairy in Victoria. He held many exhibitions in Sydney and Melbourne. Dunlop died on 11 December 2009 as the result of a long-standing heart condition.
