= Reginald Jerrold-Nathan =

English painter

Reginald Henry Jerrold-Nathan (1889 (Note: Reputable sources are divided between 1889 and 1899 for his year of birth.) – 20 September 1979), often referred to as R. H. Jerrold-Nathan or Jerrold Nathan, was an English painter who had a career in Australia as a portraitist.

== History ==
Nathan was born in London and studied painting under A. S. Cope, J. Singer Sargent John Singer Sargent and William Orpen at the Royal Academy. He arrived in Australia in 1924.

He was president of the Australian Art Society 1945–1952 and the Royal Queensland Art Society. He was a frequent contributor to Archibald Prize exhibitions.

Nathan died on 20 September 1979 at Turramurra, New South Wales.

== Subjects ==
Among the high-profile Australians who have sat for Nathan are:

- Samuel Angus
- Millicent Preston-Stanley
- Jessie Street and Linda Littlejohn
- Ethel Curlewis
- Rosalie Kunoth-Monks
- William Portus Cullen
- Cecil Purser
- Rev. Dr. Charles Prescott
