= Julia Gutman =

Australian artist (born 1993)

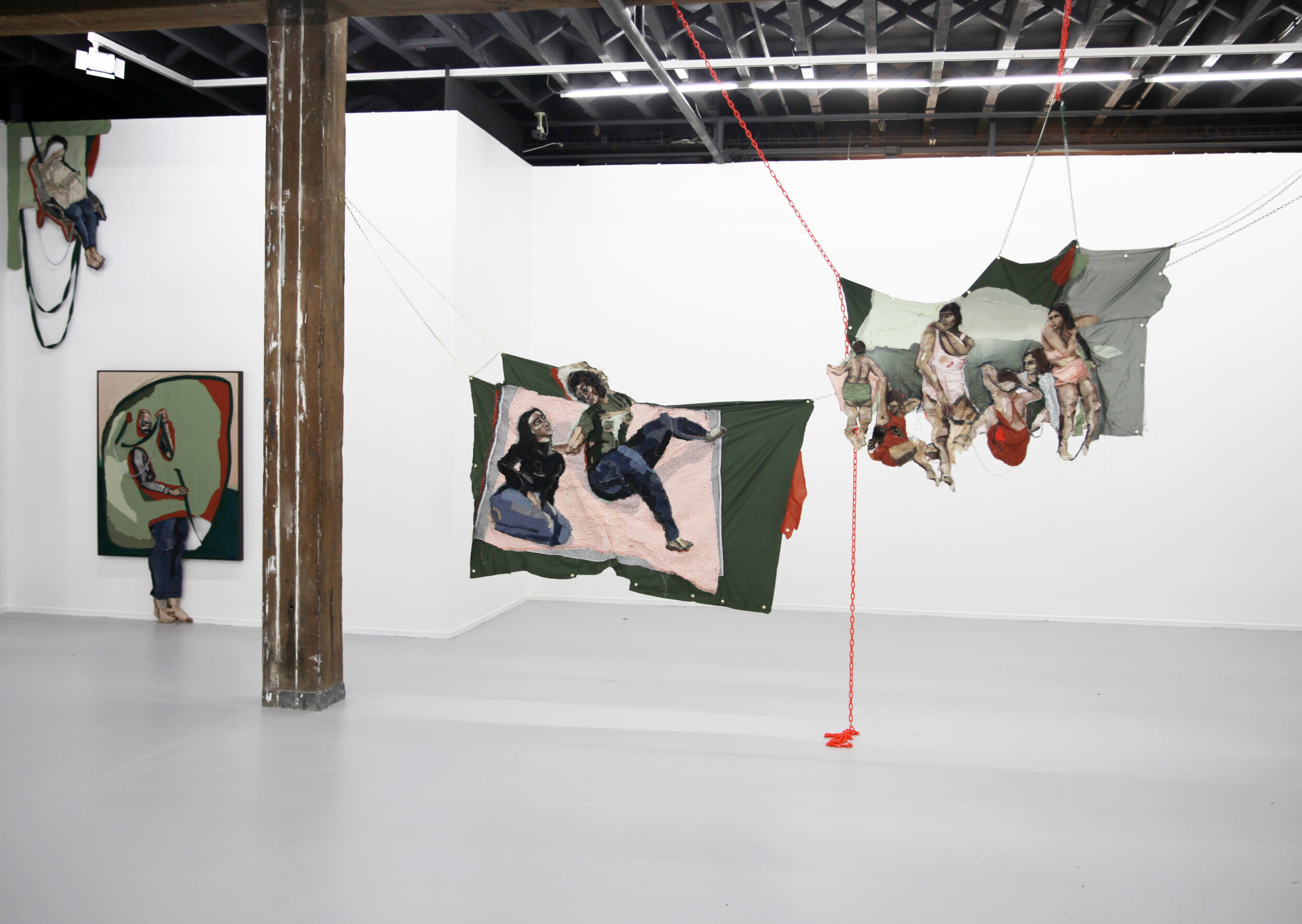
- Julia Gutman's Installation at the 2020 NSW Visual Arts Emerging Fellowship At Artspace, Sydney
- Born: 1993 (age 32–33); Melbourne, Australia
- Education: Rhode Island School of Design University of New South Wales
- Notable work: 'Head in the sky, feet on the ground'
- Style: textiles
- Awards: Archibald Prize (2023)

Julia Gutman (born 1993) is an Australian artist known for her textile based figurative works that combine embroidery, collage, and reclaimed materials. Her work often merges personal and collective histories and has been praised for its emotionally charged exploration of identity, memory, intimacy, and loss. Gutman won the 2023 Archibald Prize with a portrait composed of found textiles.

== Early life and education ==
Gutman was born in 1993. She earned a Bachelor of Fine Arts (Painting) at University of New South Wales (UNSW Art & Design). She later completed a Master of Fine Arts (Sculpture) at Rhode Island School of Design (RISD).

== Artistic practice ==
Gutman's practice is anchored in reusing and reworking found and donated textiles, often clothing, sheets, or archival fabric, to build figurative works via sewing, layering and collage.

She has said: “I think of textiles as carriers of memory. They come from people close to me, clothes worn, bedsheets slept in, pieces of fabric with a life before they reach the studio. Bringing these fabrics together, they become like a collective memory. I think that’s a nice metaphor for how unstable and porous the idea of the individual is. We are all made of the collective, after all.”

She treats her stitched textile works like painting, layering materials until the images carry both emotional and physical density.

== Career and recognition ==
In May 2023, Gutman won the Archibald Prize for her portrait Head in the sky, feet on the ground of musician Montaigne (Jessica Cerro).

On winning the prize, she said: "I’m so grateful to be working at a time when young female voices are heard." Gutman has exhibited widely across Australia and internationally.

== Echo (2024) ==
In 2024 Gutman created her first animation project, Echo, commissioned for the Sydney Opera House during Vivid LIVE.

The work reimagines the myth of Narcissus through textile-based imagery. Gutman described it as an exploration of: "the paradox of self-consciousness, the limitations of our own capacity to truly see ourselves, and the way our own unconscious wounds spill out into our perceptions of one another."

The animated projection transforms donated fabrics from her community into dreamlike landscapes. The protagonist features materials such as a mother’s scarf and an old hessian sack, traveling through rivers of denim and satin.

== Selected exhibitions ==
- life in the third person, Art Gallery of Western Australia, 2024
- A Fine Line, Sullivan+Strumpf, 2025

== Awards ==
- Archibald Prize, Art Gallery of New South Wales, 2023

== Themes and significance ==
Gutman uses textiles to explore memory, emotional history, and collective identity. She explained: "Clothes drape our bodies and move with us through life, they take on our smell and the contours of our form, so it makes sense that they feel like the closest thing we have to someone who wore them."

Her method challenges conventional boundaries between painting, textile, sculpture, and assemblage.
