= Craig Ruddy =

Australian artist (1968–2022)

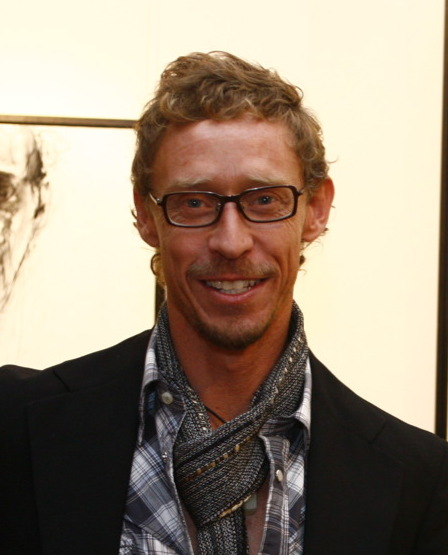
- Ruddy in 2007
- Born: 8 August 1968; Forestville, Sydney, New South Wales, Australia
- Died: 4 January 2022 (aged 53); Byron Bay, New South Wales, Australia
- Known for: Painting
- Awards: Archibald Prize; 2004 Two Worlds – Portrait of David Gulpilil Archibald People's Choice Prize; 2010 The Prince of Darkness – Portrait of Warwick Thornton
- Website: craigruddy.com

Craig Ruddy (8 August 1968 – 4 January 2022) was an Australian artist, known for winning the Archibald Prize in 2004 with his portrait of Aboriginal actor David Gulpilil.

== Early life and education ==
Ruddy was born on 8 August 1968, at Forestville, Sydney. He grew up near Ku-ring-gai Chase and Garigal National Parks. He was only allowed by his parents to participate in limited physical activity after a life-threatening illness.

In the 1980s he studied design and fashion illustration, turning to art and painting around 2001.

== Career ==
In 2004 he won the Archibald Prize for his charcoal drawing of David Gulpilil entitled Two Worlds. The portrait of the Aboriginal actor won both the Archibald portrait prize and the People's Choice Award. Another artist, Tony Johansen, took legal action against the Art Gallery of New South Wales Trust over the portrait. Johansen argued that, because Ruddy predominantly used charcoal in his work, it was a drawing and not a painting and therefore was ineligible for the prize. However the Supreme Court of New South Wales dismissed Johansen's claim.

After the 2004 Archibald, Ruddy developed Poppy Seeds, a series of portraits, nudes and self-studies which were exhibited in November 2004. The series addressed the tall poppy syndrome that often accompanies success in Australia. His diptych Self-portrait – into the box was one of the 2006 Archibald Prize finalists.

In August 2006, Ruddy's Two Worlds sold to a private collector at a Sotheby's auction in Sydney for $312,000. It had been valued at between $150,000 and $180,000.

In 2010, Ruddy won the Archibald People's Choice Prize for his portrait of Warwick Thornton entitled The Prince of Darkness. He was an Archibald Prize finalist in 2011 with a portrait of athlete Cathy Freeman and in 2020 with his portrait of author Bruce Pascoe.

== Personal life and death ==
From around 2001, Ruddy lived across three locations: the eastern Sydney suburb of Tamarama; the Byron Bay hinterland; and Buenos Aires, Argentina.

Ruddy died of complications related to COVID-19 on 4 January 2022, at the age of 53. He was unvaccinated. He was survived by his partner of 20 years, Roberto Meza Mont.

Awards
Preceded by Geoffrey Dyer	Archibald Prize; 2004 for two worlds, portrait of actor David Gulpilil	Succeeded by John Olsen
Preceded by Dalu Zhao	People's Choice Award; 2004 two worlds, portrait of actor David Gulpilil	Succeeded by Nicholas Harding
Preceded by Vincent Fantauzzo	People's Choice Award; 2010; The Prince of Darkness – Warwick Thornton	Succeeded by Adam Chang
