= Reg Campbell =

Australian artist

- Born: Reginald Earl Campbell; 2 March 1923; Gladesville, New South Wales
- Died: 30 May 2008 (aged 85); Bathurst, New South Wales
- Education: Self taught
- Known for: Portrait painting
- Awards: Archibald Prize People's Choice Award, 1990

Reginald "Reg" Earl Campbell (2 March 1923 – 30 May 2008) was an Australian portrait painter and self-taught artist. He was the winner of the Archibald Prize People's Choice Award in 1990 for his self-portrait.

== Early years ==
Campbell was born in Gladesville, New South Wales, the son of Clare Campbell and enlisted in the Australian Imperial Forces at West Ryde in 1941, whilst residing in Eastwood. He served as a private in the General Transport Company in New Guinea and was discharged in 1945.

== Art career ==
After military service, Campbell moved to Bathurst, New South Wales in the 1950s, working initially as a signwriter, and later moved to live in a peaceful rural setting, outside Bathurst, where he established his gallery and completed some of his most accomplished portraits. Some of those works include the portraits of two of Bathurst’s best-known faces, those of the late Dr Brooke-Moore and former long-serving Member for Bathurst, Gus Kelly, whose portraits have hung for years in the foyer of the Bathurst Civic Centre. Lesser-known works are the portraits that Campbell painted of two other personalities of his generation, a young radio broadcaster John Laws and the television games show personality, Bob Dyer.

One of the largest works painted by Campbell was commissioned by Bathurst Rotary to celebrate the 100th Royal Bathurst Show, a massive painting of the Bathurst Showground showing all of the historic buildings with parachutists landing in the ground. Testimony to his mastery are the commissions to paint the portraits of many prominent figures in Australia and overseas including approximately 100 knights of the realm, 23 vice regal portraits in Denmark, nine bishops and archbishops and hundreds of other famous personalities including Don Bradman, Albert Namatjira and Sir Garfield Barwick.

Campbell painted numerous portraits for the Charles Sturt University and its precursor institutions, namely:

- Evan Arthur Byron (Sam) Phillips
- Jack and Dr Colleen McDonough (double portrait)
- Professor John Maxwell Collins
- Emeritus Professor Cliff Blake, AO

Campbell was a mentor for artist, Doug Sealy and is survived by Betty-Ann, Eden, David, Joshua Campbell, Stephen and Katie Scott.
