= Evert Ploeg =

Australian portrait painter

Evert Ploeg (pronounced Ay-vert Plough; born 1963 in Sydney, New South Wales) is an Australian portrait painter. He has won a range of painting prizes, including the 1999 and 2007 Archibald Prize (Category: People's Choice) and was awarded the 'Signature Status' of The Portrait Society of America.

== Personal life ==
Born and raised in Sydney in a family of Dutch heritage, Ploeg works from his studio on the city's Northern Beaches, which was featured on Nine Network's Our House programme in 2001. He lives with his partner, film and television costumier Ivana Daniele, and their two daughters.

== Style and artistic approach ==
Ploeg works primarily in a tonal realist, mostly using oil. His pictures are inspired by documentary methods. In his early work, he explored alternative textures and surfaces, while recently his sculptural approach builds up character and emotion through tonal layering. His use of rhythmical application delivers a dynamic sense of movement while maintaining an expressive style. A dominant feature in Ploeg's work is the aesthetic rendition of hands. Over the past decade, Ploeg has begun engaging more in plein-air painting, giving his current style an 'Alla Prima' element.

== Career ==
Ploeg mainly works on a commission basis. His works are held in many of Australia's major public and private collections as well as having received sustained international coverage, especially in the USA. Aside from direct commissions, he has also participated in a number of special events, including live painting on stage for theatre projects, judging in art prize panels, and lending his time to charity causes. He also guest lectures and conducts workshops and classes across the country.

== Archibald Prize ==
Among Ploeg's achievements are his three wins at Australia's Archibald Portrait Prize held at the Art Gallery of New South Wales. Having first entered the competition in 1997 with a controversial (and ultimately ruled out) submission of a portrait of the ABC cartoon characters Bananas in Pyjamas, Ploeg has since won the Archibald People's Choice Award in 1999 (subject: Australian Indigenous actress Deborah Mailman) and in 2007 (subject: Australian conductor and musical director George Ellis), as well as its Packing Room Prize in 2004 (subject: Australian journalist Jana Wendt). Ploeg has also been selected to the Salon des Refuses of Sydney's S.H. Ervin Gallery three times with a People's Choice win there in 2000 (subject: Australian actor Richard Roxburgh), concurrent to having had his portrait of Paralympian athlete Louise Sauvage competing in the 'Sporting' Archibald held in conjunction with the 2000 Sydney Olympics. He has also entered paintings to the Archibald Prize of singer Ben Lee, fashion identity Peter Morrissey, actor Richard Roxburgh and art collector and philanthropist John Schaeffer AO (in 2014).

== Collections ==
Australian Ballet School, Melbourne Australian Broadcasting Corporation Australian War Memorial CERA – Royal Victorian Eye & Ear Hospital Florey Institute (Melbourne) Melbourne Cricket Club National Portrait Gallery of Australia St John Ambulance (Canberra) The Australiana Fund The University of Melbourne – Economics The University of Melbourne – Law School

Private School Collections (Victoria): Camberwell Grammar School Lauriston Girls School Queens College

As well as numerous private collections in Australia, the UK, Netherlands, Italy, Sweden & USA.

== Commissions ==
The majority of Ploeg's commissions originate from commercial and corporate institutions, which led him to paint, for example, Mrs Tamie Fraser AO for the Australiana Fund in 2018, Prof. Fred Hilmer AO, eighth Vice-Chancellor of The University of New South Wales and Deputy-Chairman of the Westfield Group, with the work included in the 20/20 exhibition at the Australian National Portrait Gallery (2018).

Before committing to portraiture, Ploeg worked as a trained illustrator for 13 years, having graduated East Sydney's Design College (now: National Art School) in 1984. His work was commissioned by department stores, cosmetic companies, advertising agencies and publishing houses and was regularly featured in editorial and advertisement spreads in fashion magazines. He was commissioned to illustrate the re-publications of Australian children's stories such as We of the Never, Never and Clancy of the Overflow by Australian poet Banjo Patterson (Angus & Robertson (1987, 1989 & 1990). For this kind of work, he received an award from publisher Random House for Outstanding Cover in 1999. Following this success, publisher Hodder Headline enlisted Ploeg to illustrate the cover jackets for seven books of Geoffrey McSkimming's children's adventure series Cairo Jim (1996).

== Theatre work ==
In addition to his regular portraiture commissions, Ploeg has for the past decade been involved with Australian arts and social change company Big hART Inc., which conducts large-scale, long-term community development projects. In September 2010, he joined the cast of their Namatjira production at Sydney's premier Belvoir Street Theatre, which relates the biographical story of late Western Aranda watercolor painter Albert (Elea) Namatjira (1902–59). Ploeg was painting lead actor Trevor Jamieson's portrait while he was performing his role live on stage, retelling the story of one of Australia's most famous Indigenous artists. Over the season and its subsequent national tour (2012), Ploeg completed eight paintings, which were exhibited and sold at the Adelaide State Gallery & Museum together with other visual art created in the context of Big hART's project. Ploeg's association with the company has continued beyond the Namatjira Project, with him also participating in creative developments of their Yijala Yala Project in the Pilbara communities of Western Australia (since 2011) and in their seafaring project Blue Angel. Those works were first exhibited in the 2015 Tasmanian 10 Days on the Island Festival as part of a site-specific theatre production in Hobart's Astor Hotel, with a subsequent presentation having occurred at the Wooden Boat Festival at the Australian National Maritime Museum in Sydney on board the ship James Craig in 2016.

In between these engagements with Big hART, Ploeg was also invited to sketch a live portrait of actor Kurt Sutton while performing in the play An Evening with Mark Twain at Elm Street Theatre in Woodstock (Atlanta, USA) in 2013.

== Recognition, Honors and Awards ==
Internationally, Ploeg has had a long involvement with the Portrait Society of America. First awarded in their 2005 International Competition, he has gone on to garner further awards including Best of Show (2011) and Certificate of Excellence (2017 & 2019). In the Society's Membership Only competition, he received Honourable Mentions and Merit Awards in 2010, 2012, 2014, 2015 and twice First Place in the highly contested Commissioned category (2016 & 2018). In 2018, the Society granted Ploeg the highly prized lifelong Signature Status. In 2015, Ploeg was selected as one of 10 artists worldwide to compete in the New York Grand Central Academy's Alla Prima Portrait Competition, whose works were exhibited in a month-long show at Eleventh St Arts in Long Island. Earlier (in 2014 & 2005), he had participated in the Macquarie Bank-sponsored Portrait Artists Australia exhibition held in the Australian Embassy in Washington DC. Other international accolades include long-listed works in the BP Portrait Award in London, UK (2015 & 2016). Nationally, in addition to his Archibald awards, he also won the Shirley Hannan National Portrait Prize (2005), has been a multiple finalist in the Doug Moran National Portrait Prize, six-time finalist in the Black Swan Portrait Prize (Western Australia) and has three works in St John Ambulance, with the last one having been unveiled at Government House in Canberra in 2019.

== Honours and Awards Roll ==
2019: Certificate of Excellence – International Competition (Portrait Society of America)

2018 Lifelong Signature Status (Portrait Society of America) Semi Finalist – Doug Moran National Portrait Prize Winner Members Only Competition – Commissioned Category (Portrait Society of America)

2017: Certificate of Excellence – International Competition (Portrait Society of America) Finalist – Black Swan Portrait Prize

2016: Long-listed BP Portrait Award, London Winner Hunters Hill Art Prize Finalist Black Swan Portrait Prize Winner Members Only Competition – Commissioned Category (Portrait Society of America) Finalist Art Renewal Centre – 12th International Salon

2015: Long-listed BP Portrait Award, London Finalist Doug Moran National Portrait Prize Merit Award Members Only Competition – Commissioned Category (Portrait Society of America)

2014: Finalist Archibald Portrait Prize Finalist Shirley Hannan National Portrait Prize Finalist Black Swan Portrait Prize 2nd Place Members Only Competition – Non-Commissioned Category (Portrait Society of America) Finalist Doug Moran National Portrait Prize

2013: Honourable Mention Portfolio Submission (Portrait Society of America) Finalist Black Swan Portrait Prize

2012: Honourable Mention Members Only Competition – Non-Commissioned Category (Portrait Society of America) Certificate of Excellence – International Competition (Portrait Society of America) Finalist Shirley Hannan National Portrait Prize

2011: Winner Best of Show – International Competition (Portrait Society of America) Highly Commended Mortimore Prize – Small Category Finalist Black Swan Portrait Prize

2010: Honourable Mention Members Only Competition – Oil Category (Portrait Society of America) Finalist Shirley Hannan National Portrait Prize Finalist Kilgour Art Prize for Figurative Painting Winner Ex Arte Equinus IV – Painting Category (International Equine Art)

2009: Highly Commended Black Swan Portrait Prize Finalist Mortimore Art Prize

2008: Finalist Shirley Hannan National Portrait Prize Finalist ANL Maritime Art Award (Mission to Seafarers) Commended Berkelouw Self Portrait Prize

2007: Winner Archibald Prize – People's Choice Category

2006: Finalist Doug Moran National Portrait Prize Finalist Shirley Hannan National Portrait Prize

2005: Winner International Portrait Competition – Exceptional Merit Award (Portrait Society of America) Winner Shirley Hannan National Portrait Prize Commended Inaugural Berkelouw Portrait Prize

2004: Winner Archibald Prize – Packing Room Prize Highly Commended Shirley Hannan National Portrait Prize

2003: Winner People's Choice (Portrait Artists Australia) Honourable Mention Shirley Hannan National Portrait Prize

2000: Winner 'Salon Des Refuse' – Holding Redlich People's Choice Award (S.H Ervin Gallery) Finalist Sporting Portrait Prize of Australia (Art Gallery of New South Wales) Finalist Doug Moran National Portrait Prize

1999: Winner Archibald Prize – People's Choice Winner Listener's Choice Award (2BL Radio) Winner Listener's Choice Award (2CR ABC Radio) Winner Outstanding Cover Award (Random House Publishing)

1998 3rd Place 'Salon Des Refuse' – People's Choice Award (S.H Ervin Gallery)

== Exhibitions ==
In addition to the (often nationally travelling) exhibitions as part of the above-named art prizes, Ploeg's work was shown on many occasions, including the following:

2018: 20/20 Celebrating 2O Years – National Portrait Gallery Monday Nights – Northern Beaches Creative Space

2017: Cabaret – Glen Street Theatre Land – Manly Gallery & Museum World Polo Championship Art Exhibition – Sydney Polo Club Expresso Yourself CupART

2016: Wooden Boat Festival – Australian Maritime Museum Mystery Art Sale Donation – Portrait Society of America Hunters Hill Art Prize Virtual Connections – No.1 Martin Place Sydney

2015: Imago Mundini – global art project initiated by Luciano Benetton Eleventh St Arts, Grand Central Atelier (New York, USA) Saltwater – Manly Art Gallery & Museum Project 504 – Sydney

2014: Portrait Artists Australia – Australian Embassy (Washington DC, USA)

2013: Keeping Company – Manly Art Gallery & Museum Multicultural Australia – NSW Parliament House (Portrait Artists Australia) Mystery Art Sale Donation – Portrait Society of America Ngurratjuta Many Hands Art Center, Alice Springs

2012: Adelaide Festival – ArtSpace Adelaide State Gallery & Museum

2011: Mystery Art Sale Donation – Portrait Society of America Fundraiser Donation Art57 – Manly Selective Campus Inglis Equine Art Prize – Sydney Inglis Sales Complex Melbourne Oaklands Mortimore Art Prize Scots College – Orange, Mudgee, Byron Bay, Canberra, Murwillumbah, Bendigo All the World's a Stage – Victorian Art Society (Portrait Artists Australia)

2010: Face –Off – MLC Gallery, Sydney (Portrait Artists Australia) Mystery Art Sale Donation – Portrait Society of America The Artist Muse – Arthouse Hotel, Sydney Kilgour Figurative Painting Prize – Newcastle Regional Gallery

2009: In Paradise: Artists of the Northern Beaches – Manly Art Gallery & Museum

2008: The Art of Healing – Arthouse Hotel, Sydney New works & Collectors – DeHavilland Gallery, Wollongong

2007: Intimate Studies – Texture and Form – Catalina Gallery, Avalon

2006: Mosman Art Prize – Mosman Art Gallery

2005: Fur and Feathers – Arthouse Hotel, Sydney

2004: Courtroom and Street Antics – Arthouse Hotel, Sydney

2003: Unhung Heroes – Made for Australia Gallery, Canberra

2002: Warringah Art Exhibition, Brookvale

1995: Mask of Myth ¬– Annandale, Sydney
