= Mary Edwell-Burke =

Australian artist (1894–1988)

- Self-portrait, 1936
- Born: Mary Edwards; 19 June 1894; Sydney, New South Wales, Australia
- Died: 19 January 1988 (aged 93); Fiji
- Known for: Painting, Sculpture

Mary Edwell-Burke (1894–1988), was a traditionalist Australian painter and carver.

== Early life and training ==
Edwell-Burke was born in Sydney on 19 June 1894. She was the half-sister of Bernice E. Edwell. She studied at the East Sydney Technical College.

== Archibald Prize ==
In the 1920s, she exhibited with New South Wales' Royal Art Society as Mary Edwards, and was a finalist for the Archibald Prize in 1921 and 1922. In 1944, she, along with Joseph Wolinski, brought an unsuccessful legal action to overturn William Dobell's 1943 Archibald prize for his portrait, Mr Joshua Smith, claiming the image was more a caricature than a portrait.

== Conservatism ==
From 1935-1945, Mary exhibited under the surname Edwards with the Australian Watercolour Institute and, in 1950, joined as Edwards in the Fellowship of Australian Artists, proclaiming that "I am wholly with you in believing that the present trend in Australian art needs to be met by banding together to fight for sanity and wholesomeness."

== Fiji ==
In 1945, her portrait of Dame Enid Lyons, was rejected as "unsatisfactory" by the Federal Government’s Historic Memorials Committee. Edwell-Burke subsequently moved to Fiji and changed her name from Mary Edwards to Mary Edwell-Burke.

Edwell-Burke died in Fiji on 19 January 1988.
