= Charles Wheeler (painter) =

Australian painter

Charles Arthur Wheeler
- Born: 4 January 1880; Dunedin, New Zealand
- Died: 26 October 1977 (aged 97)

Charles Arthur Wheeler OBE, DCM (4 January 1881 – 26 October 1977) was an Australian painter known for his landscapes, portraits and nudes.

== Early life ==
Born in Dunedin, New Zealand, after the death of his father Wheeler, aged about ten, arrived in Australia with his mother, where they lived in Williamstown. While apprenticed as a lithographer from 1895 with C. Troedel & Co., he studied part time at the Working Men's College. After three years there, he enrolled in night classes in drawing the National Gallery schools under Frederick McCubbin, graduating in 1905 into L. Bernard Hall's painting classes.

Interviewed by John Hetherington in 1963, he declared that "about sixty years ago I threw up my job as a lithographic artist to give all my time to painting. Some of my friends shook their heads and thought I was being madly unpractical. I told them, "But I'm living now!" and I was living. I've gone on living. If that was a sacrifice it was a hundred times worth while."

== Professional artist ==
From Wheeler's first one-man show in 1910 the Art Gallery of New South Wales purchased The Portfolio, while the National Gallery of Victoria added The Poem to its collection. Wheeler exhibited with the Victorian Artists' Society in 1908-10 and with the Australian Art Association in the 1920s and 1930s.

He left for England in April 1912. In World War I, he enlisted in the 22nd Battalion, Royal Fusiliers. His Distinguished Conduct Medal (DSM) (1916) was awarded for actions at Vimy Ridge. Though not an official war artist his Beauty and Beastliness was considered for inclusion in the Australian War Memorial’s record of WWI. As Moore notes, it "gives a vivid impression of the relentless conflict in Delville Wood in the summer of 1916, the contrast between the beauty of the natural scene and the continuous slaughter suggesting the title of this extraordinary composition."

On his return, in 1919 Wheeler was elected a member of The Australian Art Association based in Melbourne, with which he was a very active exhibitor after the war and through the 1920s and 1930s. Noted for his portraits and figurative works, he won the Archibald Prize for 1933.

== Educator ==
Having taught after WWI at the Melbourne Technical College, then from 1927 at the National Gallery School as a drawing instructor with a firm belief in the primacy of good drawing in painting. In 1939 he was appointed master of the painting school there. From 1945 he retired from teachng to concentrate on is own work.

== Ethos ==
Wheeler was of a conservative outlook, vehemently opposing communism, and unconvinced by Modernism, remarking that: "now and again in an abstract painting I see an interesting pattern and interesting colour, but I want more than that. I believe most people always will want more than that. Picasso, the god of the moderns, was a very talented painter as a young man, but he wished to be noticed early in life, so he set himself to startle everybody."

Awards
Preceded by Ernest Buckmaster	Archibald Prize; 1933 for Ambrose Pratt	Succeeded by Henry Hanke
