= Wes Walters =

Australian artist (1928–2014)

Wes(ley) Walters (1928–2014) was an Australian artist and winner of the Archibald Prize. Walters was born in Mildura, Victoria, in 1928. He was a realist portrait painter and abstract artist who painted nearly 200 portraits of leading Australians, especially academics, businessmen, artists, and musicians. He was awarded the Minnie Crouch Prize at the Art Gallery of Ballarat in 1953 and 1956. He won the 1979 Archibald prize in 1980 with a portrait of Phillip Adams. He was a finalist in the Doug Moran National Portrait Prize in 1988 and 1990. He painted a 1.3 metre high, 1 metre wide portrait of the Central Queensland University's Chancellor, Justice Stan Jones. In 1998 he painted Donald Bradman. Walters died on 19 August 2014. Although Walters had been painting in a non-figurative style since the early 1960s, he did not hold his first exhibition of abstract works until 2001. He was elected to the Illustrators Hall of Fame in 1993.

In 2009 the book 'Walters: art of realism & abstraction' by David Thomas was published.

Awards
Preceded by Brett Whiteley	Archibald Prize; 1979 for Portrait of Phillip Adams	Succeeded by Not awarded (Eric Smith, 1981)
