= Ernest Buckmaster =

Australian painter

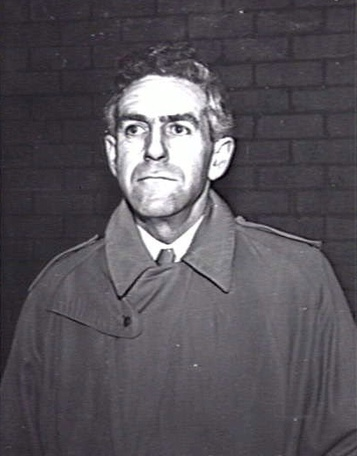
- Born: 3 July 1897; Hawthorn, Melbourne
- Died: 18 October 1968 (aged 71); Warrandyte, Melbourne
- Resting place: Lilydale, cemetery
- Style: Realist
- Spouse(s): Dorothy Laura Cook (1936–38); Florence Botting (1939–68)
- Awards: The Archibald Prize (1932); the National Gallery of Victoria award (1941); the Albury prize (1950, 1963)
- Patrons: Cyril Steele

Ernest William Buckmaster (1897–1968) was an Australian artist born in Victoria. He won the Archibald Prize in 1932 with a portrait of Sir William Irvine. He also served as an Australian war artist during World War II.

Although an accomplished painter of portraits and still life subjects, he is best known for his landscapes; a follower of the Heidelberg School. Those he generally painted en plein air rather than from photographs.

== Early life ==
Buckmaster was born in the Melbourne suburb of Hawthorn on 3 July 1897. He was the first son of five boys and three girls of Harry Amos Buckmaster (d. 26 June 1938), straw-hat manufacturer, and his wife Letitia Martha née Chandler (c. 1873–19 October 1953). He attended a state primary school at Box Hill where he showed drawing skills at an early age.

His life was challenged on enough occasions, having nearly drowned as a child, attacked by a cow, chased by a bull, almost fell from a roof, and motor vehicle incidents.

Leaving school at 14 he first started employment as a messenger boy. Buckmaster was apprenticed to a signwriter in 1913. His poor physique made him unsuitable for service in World War I. His employer, an amateur painter, suggested he undertake art training.

== Career ==
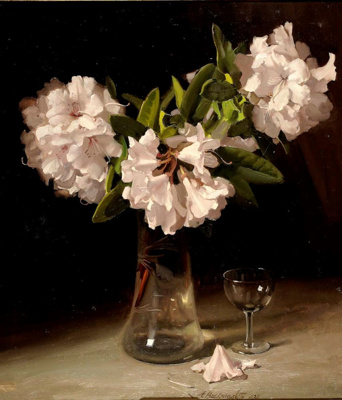
"Rhododendrons", 1930, by Ernest Buckmaster. (New England Regional Art Museum)

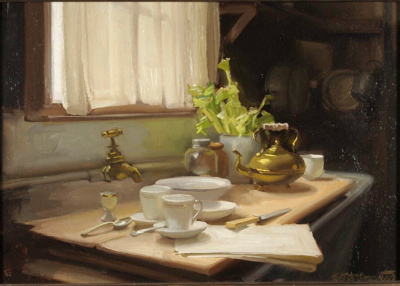
Still life, 1945, by E. Buckmaster. (New England Regional Art Museum)

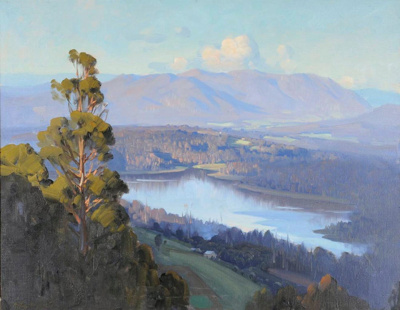
"Evening, Olinda", 1939, by E. Buckmaster. (New England Regional Art Museum)

Buckmaster studied at the National Gallery School in Melbourne from 1918 to 1924. There his teachers included Lindsay Bernard Hall and W. B. McInnes. He emerged as an accomplished painter of traditional portraits, still lifes and landscapes with a substantial work-rate and output. Large commissioned oil paintings work took longer; although known as a rapid painter, for sittings, for a head, two hours to two weeks, a three-quarter portrait on average, 15 to 20 hours.

His first solo exhibition took place at the Athenaeum Gallery in Melbourne in February 1926. His financial position was such that he had to ask the framer to prepare them for hanging on credit. The paintings sold well, with one bought by the director of the National Gallery of Victoria for its collection.

His work is popular in Australia and New Zealand where public art galleries and private collectors hold examples of his paintings. Buckmaster disliked modern art, criticising it in his book and in letters to newspapers, saying 'This kind of art must not be seen, it seems, in case young students are tempted to try it themselves'. A member of the Victorian Artists Society, he sold nineteen paintings exhibited with them between 1919 and 1924. He continued to be associated with the VAS as a councillor (1929–30) and exhibitor (till 1943); Buckmaster resigned at one stage from VAS, a difference of judgements and values of art juries. In 1930 he left Australia on a year-long study tour to Europe. He visited Europe again in 1938.

His portrait of the lieutenant-governor of Victoria, Sir William Irvine, won the Archibald Prize for 1932. The prize was worth £528 (equivalent to A$57,770 in 2022). His Archibald prize-winning portrait took fourteen sittings with the subject before it was finished, about 15 hours. Buckmaster had been a competitor for the Prize several times previous, including a self-portrait submitted for 1927.

The following year he held solo exhibits in Melbourne, Sydney, and Adelaide. He was a foundation member of the Australian Academy of Art. In 1936 he was commissioned to paint a portrait of Sir James Mitchell, the lieutenant-governor of Western Australia and his portrait of Miss Jessica Harcourt, known as "Australia's loveliest girl" was a finalist in the 1936 Archibald Prize.

Standing 5 ft 8.5 in (1.74 m) height and 10 stone 1 pound (64 kg) weight and now living at Bailey Road, Mount Evelyn with his second wife and three young children, Buckmaster became a Second World War official war artist for the Australian military's Military History Section. This took him directly to Singapore to paint the Japanese surrender. Fourteen days saw fourteen 34 by 24 inches (860 mm × 610 mm) canvases. These paintings are held by the Australian War Memorial, Canberra.

Buckmaster made two extended trips to New Zealand in the 1940s and 1950s at the invitation of Henry Kelliher, Managing Director of Dominion Breweries in Auckland, who had seen Buckmaster's 1944 exhibition at the David Jones Gallery, Sydney. On the latter visit he wrote that he had driven 6,000 miles (9,700 km) throughout the country to paint landscapes.

== Later life ==
Aged 38, Buckmaster married Dorothy Laura Cook on Wednesday 12 February 1936 at the chapel of the Methodist Ladies' College, Melbourne. Now living at Riddell Parade, Elsternwick, Melbourne, after two years, Buckmaster was divorced by his wife on Monday 14 November 1938 on the grounds of repeated acts of misconduct. They had no children. He then married Florence Botting in Melbourne in February 1939.

He died on Friday 18 October 1968 at his home at Warrandyte. He was survived by his wife Florence and their five children. His grave is in the Lilydale cemetery.

== Recognition and legacies ==
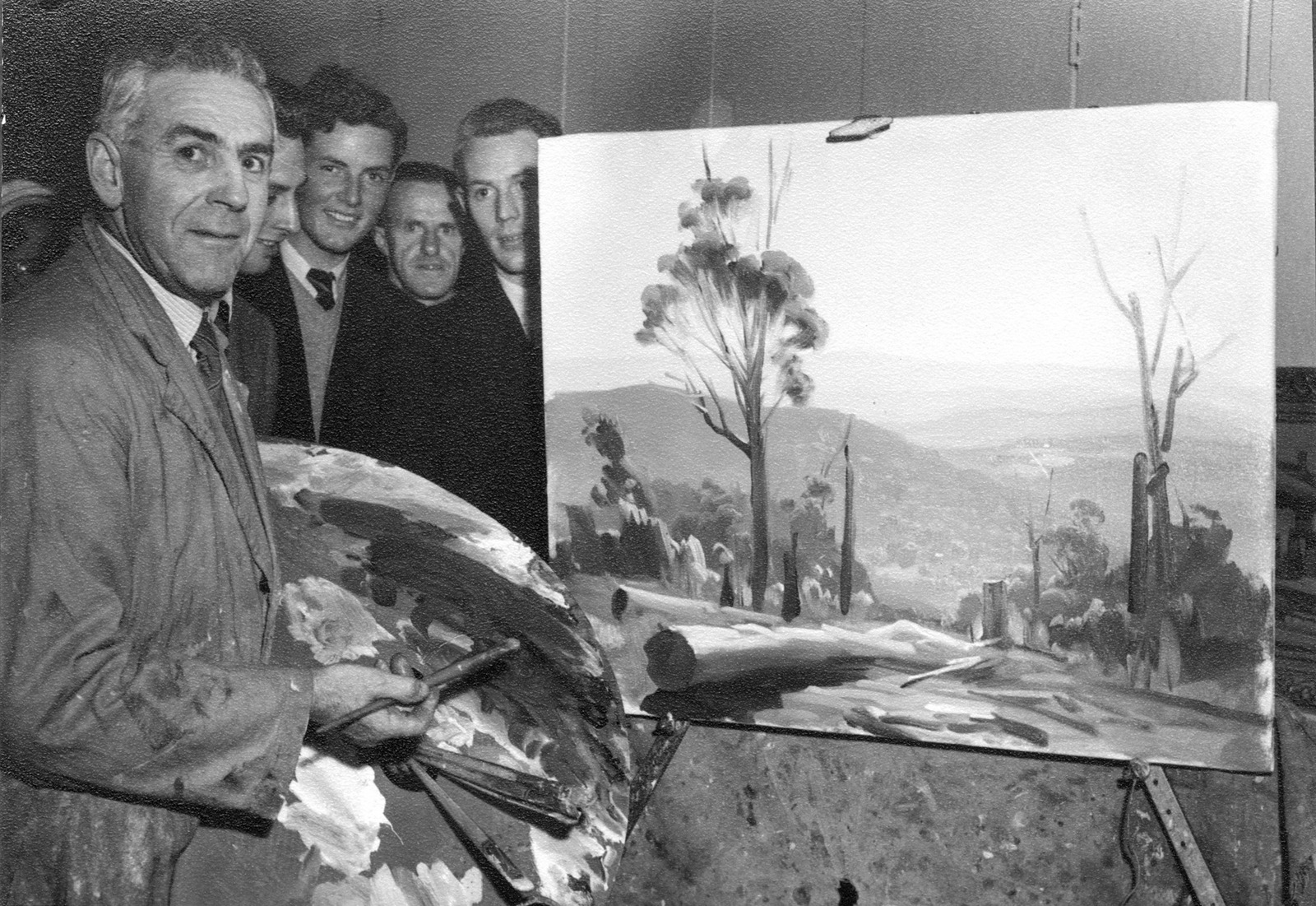
Ernest Buckmaster showing students how to paint c. 1950. One of the students is James Mollison (State Library of Victoria)

Buckmaster's self-portrait, which was a finalist in the 1936 Archibald Prize, is in the Art Gallery of New South Wales. As well as the 1932 Archibald Prize he received the 1941 National Gallery of Victoria Award, and twice won the Albury Art Prize (in 1950 and 1963).

His portraits included etcher John Shirlow (1869–1936), in oil.

Buckmaster's autobiography So far: The art of Ernest Buckmaster was published in 1951.

Some of Buckmaster's work is on extended loan from his family to the 1883 Hotel Windsor in Melbourne.

One of his paintings sold for A$27,025 in 2003. The average price of 1,185 of his paintings recently sold at auction prior to May 2021 was A$5,147.

== See also ==
- Australian art

Awards
Preceded by John Longstaff	Archibald Prize; 1932 for Sir William Irvine	Succeeded by Charles Wheeler
