= Fred Cress =

British painter (1938–2009)

Fred Cress AM
- Born: Frederick Harold Cress; 10 July 1938; Poona, British Raj
- Died: 14 October 2009 (aged 71); Sydney, New South Wales, Australia
- Awards: 1988 Archibald Prize

Frederick Harold Cress AM (10 July 1938 – 14 October 2009) was a British painter who migrated to Australia and won the Archibald Prize in 1988 with a portrait of John Beard.

Cress was born in Poona, British Raj, but went to England with his parents in 1948, when he was ten. He was educated at the Birmingham College of Art in England, and migrated to Australia in 1962 as a "ten pound Pom", meaning that he only had to pay ten pound for his fare to Australia. Cress met the painter Anne Judell and married her in 1967; they divorced in 1991. He started his career painting figuratively but became well known for his abstract work in the late 60s and 70s. He returned to figurative painting in the late 80s after he won the Archibald Prize with a portrait of his friend and colleague, John Beard. He was made a Member of the Order of Australia in 2003 for services to visual arts.

In 1990 Cress bought a 17th-century stone farmhouse in Southern Burgundy, France. He spent the next 20 years of his life living half the year in France and half the year in Sydney with his partner, the photographer, Victoria Fernandez. Many of Cress's later works have visual references to his time spent in France.

Cress was diagnosed with prostate cancer in January 2003. In 2009 he declined to continue with treatment while he worked on his last exhibition, entitled 'End Game One', held in Australian Galleries, Paddington. He died on 14 October 2009.

== Representation ==
- Buratti Fine Art, Perth www.buratti.com.au
- Australian Galleries, Sydney

Awards
Preceded by William Robinson	Archibald Prize; 1988 for John Beard	Succeeded by Bryan Westwood
