= Archibald Prize =

Australian portraiture prize

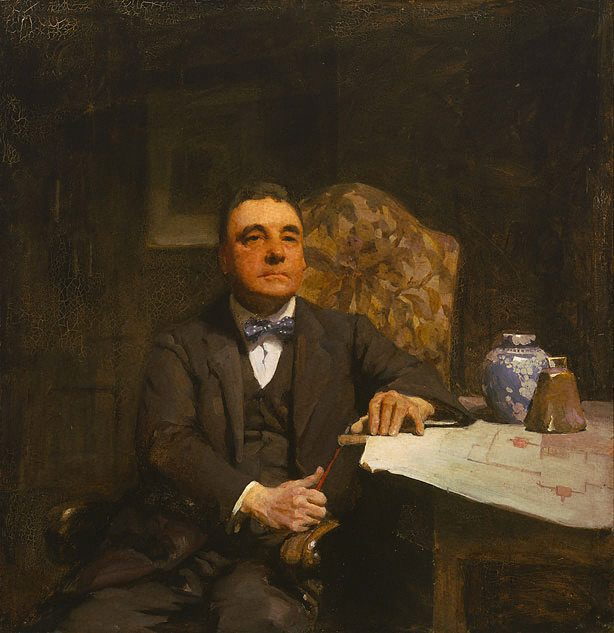
- Desbrowe Annear by W B McInnes, the first Archibald Prize winner (1921)
- Sponsored by: Art Gallery of NSW
- Location: New South Wales
- Country: Australia
- Reward: AU$100,000
- First award: 1921 (Desbrowe Annear)
- Currently held by: Richard Lewer for Iluwanti Ken, 2026

Highlights
- Most awards: Sir William Dargie (8)
- Website: https://www.artgallery.nsw.gov.au/prizes/archibald/
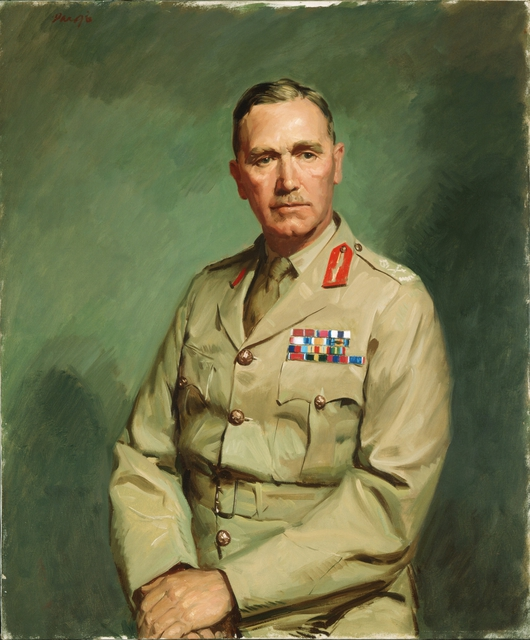
- Lt-General The Hon Edmund Francis Herring, DSO, MC, ED by Sir William Dargie (1945)

The Archibald Prize is an Australian portraiture art prize for painting, generally seen as the most prestigious portrait prize in Australia. It was first awarded in 1921 after the receipt of a bequest from J. F. Archibald, the editor of The Bulletin who died in 1919. It is administered by the trustees of the Art Gallery of New South Wales and awarded for "the best portrait, preferentially of some man or woman distinguished in Art, Letters, Science or Politics, painted by an artist resident in Australia during the twelve months preceding the date fixed by the trustees for sending in the pictures". The Archibald Prize has been awarded annually since 1921 (with two exceptions) and since July 2015 the prize has been AU$100,000.

== Winners ==
=== Prize money ===
- 1921 – £400
- 1941 – £443 / 13 / 4
- 1942 – £441 / 11 / 11
- 1951 – £500
- 1970 – $2,000
- 1971 – $4,000
- 2006 – $35,000
- 2008 – $50,000
- 2013 – $60,000
- 2012 – $75,000
- 2015 – $100,000

== Additional prizes ==
Since 1988 two other prizes have been added to the Archibald prize event.

=== People's Choice Award ===
The People's Choice Award, in which votes from the public viewing the finalists are collected to find a winner, was first awarded in 1988. Since 2021 the award comes with a monetary prize of A$5,000. The inaugural People's Choice Award prize was won by Fred Cress with his portrait of fellow artist John Beard, which had won the Archibald Prize. This was the first 'double' win until Craig Ruddy won both awards with his portrait of David Gulpilil (David Gulpilil, Two Worlds) in 2004.

=== Packing Room Prize ===
In 1992 the Packing Room Prize was established, in which the staff who receive the portraits and install them in the gallery vote for their choice of winner. Head packer Brett Cuthbertson receives 52% of the vote between packers for the prize. The Packing Room Prize is awarded annually and since 2023, the prize has been A$3,000.

To date there has never been an Archibald Prize winner who has also been a Packing Room Prize winner. (In fact, a number of Packing Room Prize winners have not been Archibald Prize finalists). For this reason winning the Packing Room Prize is known as "the kiss of death award".

There has twice been a matching Packing Room Prize and People's Choice Award winner – although neither won the main prize – to Paul Newton's portrait of Roy Slaven and HG Nelson in 2001, and to Jan Williamson's portrait of singer/songwriter Jenny Morris in 2002.

Danelle Bergstrom has won the Packing Room Prize twice, first in 1995 with a portrait of singer/songwriter Jon English, and again in 2007 with a portrait of actor Jack Thompson, with the work entitled Take Two.

In 2020 Meyne Wyatt became the first Indigenous artist to win the Packing Room Prize.

== Related distinctions ==
=== Archibald finalists ===
- Lists of Archibald Prize finalists
- Category:Archibald Prize finalists

=== Salon des Refusés ===
Since 1992, a selection of entrants not included amongst the finalists has been included in the Salon des Refusés.

==== Salon des Refusés People's Choice Award ====
Since 1999, Sydney based law firm Holding Redlich have sponsored a Salon des Refusés People's Choice Award.

== Young Archie competition ==
The Young Archie competition was established in 2013 for children aged 5–18. Entrants are divided into four age categories.

== Associated prizes ==
The Archibald Prize is held at the same time as the Sir John Sulman Prize, the Wynne Prize, the Mortimore Prize for Realism, the Australian Photographic Portrait Prize, the Young Archie competition and (before 2003) the Dobell Prize. The Archibald is the next richest portrait prize in Australia after the Doug Moran National Portrait Prize.

In 1978 Brett Whiteley won the Archibald, Wynne and Sulman Prizes all in the same year, the only time this has happened. It was his second win for the Archibald and the other prizes as well.

The satirical Bald Archy Prize, supposedly judged by a cockatoo, was started in 1994 at the Coolac Festival of Fun as a parody of the Archibald Prize; it attracted so many visitors that it has moved to Sydney.

== History and controversies ==
The prize has attracted numerous controversies and several court cases. The most famous was in 1943, when William Dobell's winning painting, Mr Joshua Smith, a portrait of fellow artist Joshua Smith, was challenged because of claims it was a caricature rather than a portrait.

Max Meldrum criticised the 1938 Archibald Prize winner, Nora Heysen, saying that women could not be expected to paint as well as men. Heysen was the first woman to win the Archibald Prize, with a portrait of Madame Elink Schuurman, the wife of the Consul General for the Netherlands.

In 1953, several art students, including John Olsen, protested against William Dargie's winning portrait, the seventh time he had been awarded the prize. One protester tied a sign around her dog which said "Winner Archibald Prize – William Doggie". Dargie went on to win the prize again in 1956.

On becoming prime minister in 1972, Gough Whitlam commissioned his friend Clifton Pugh to paint the official portrait. Normally the Australian Parliament Historical Memorial Committee would have commissioned a portrait. Pugh's portrait of Whitlam won the 1972 Archibald Prize.

In 1975, John Bloomfield's portrait of Tim Burstall was disqualified on the grounds that it had been painted from a blown up photograph, rather than from life. The prize was then awarded to Kevin Connor. In 1983, John Bloomfield sued for the return of the 1975 prize which was unsuccessful. As a result of the controversy, the application form for the Archibald Prize was modified to make it clear that the subject must be painted from life. Bloomfield later claimed that Eric Smith's winning 1981 portrait of Rudy Komon was painted from a photograph taken in 1974. This claim was refuted by Smith and Komon and the Trustees agreed with the artist and the complaint was dismissed on 23 September 1983.

In 1985, administration of the trust was transferred to the Art Gallery of New South Wales, after a court case where the Perpetual Trustee Company took the Australian Journalists Association Benevolent Fund to court.

In 1997, the painting by Evert Ploeg of the Bananas in Pyjamas television characters was deemed ineligible by the trustees because it was not a painting of a person.

Another controversy involved the 2000 Archibald winner, when artist Adam Cullen lodged a complaint with the Australian Broadcasting Corporation, that it had used his painting, Portrait of David Wenham, in a television commercial.

In 2002, head packer Steve Peters singled out a painting of himself by Dave Machin as a possible winner for the Packing Room Prize. It did not win, but it was hung outside the Archibald exhibition. Following that, portraits of the head packer were no longer allowed.

In 2004, Craig Ruddy's image of David Gulpilil, which won both the main prize and the "People's Choice" award, was challenged on the basis that it was a charcoal sketch rather than a painting. The claim was dismissed in the Supreme Court of New South Wales in June 2006.

In 2008, Sam Leach's image of himself in a Nazi uniform made the front page of Melbourne's newspaper The Age and sparked a national debate about the appropriateness of his choice of subject matter.

The prize money was also changed to $50,000. It was changed twice more, and as of 2015 is worth $100,000.

In 2020 the competition was delayed due to the COVID-19 pandemic, and for the first time an Indigenous painter (Vincent Namatjira) won the prize.
