= List of Archibald Prize 2005 finalists =

This is a list of finalists for the 2005 Archibald Prize for portraiture (listed is Artist – Title).

- Rick Amor – Shane Maloney (Image)
- Bruce Armstrong – Self portrait (Image)
- Martin Ball – John Pule
- John Beard – Hilarie Mais
- Jason Benjamin – Staring down the past – (Bill Hunter) (Image) (Winner of the Packing Room Prize)
- Annette Bezor – Still posing after all this time (a self portrait)
- Jon Campbell – Double Darren
- Adam Chang – Gene & the doorway
- Peter Churcher – Portrait of Jeffrey Smart
- Esther Erlich – Lindy Wills
- James Guppy – Chagrin
- Robert Hannaford – Bob Brown
- Nicholas Harding – Bob's daily swim – (Robert Dickerson) (Image) (Winner of the People's Choice Award)
- Bill Hay – Allan Mitelman
- Terrence Hunter Chapter Six – Self portrait
- Paul Jackson – Gretel Killeen
- Raymond Kenyon – The architect at home – (Glenn Murcutt)
- Jasper Knight – Richard Gill
- Kerrie Lester – Rebel
- Mathew Lynn – Wendy drawing – (Wendy Sharpe)
- Lewis Miller – My dentist – Dr Jonathan Hartley
- Ian North – Daniel Thomas at home, Northern Tasmania
- John Olsen – Self portrait Janus faced (Winner of the Archibald Prize)
- Rodney Pople – Kerrie Lester – after Goya
- Ben Quilty – Beryl – (Beryl Whiteley, mother of Brett Whiteley)
- Abdul Karim – Rahimi John McDonald
- David Ralph – Imagination – Adam and Harvie – (Adam Elliot was the creator of Harvie Krumpet)
- Paul Ryan – Archibald, Archibald, wherefore art thou Archibald?
- Jenny Sages – Gloria Tamere Petyarre
- Garry Shead – All the World's a Stage – Simon Phillips
- Jiawei Shen – John So, The Lord Mayor of Melbourne
- Avril Thomas – The Minister from down under – (Hon. Alexander Downer M.P.)
- Deborah Trusson – Naked
- John R. Walker – Self portrait
- Xu Wang – Jiawei Shen
- Michael Zavros – Portrait of Alex Dimitriades

== See also ==
- Previous year: List of Archibald Prize 2004 finalists
- Next year: List of Archibald Prize 2006 finalists
- List of Archibald Prize winners
