= List of Archibald Prize 2007 finalists =

This is a list of finalists for the 2007 Archibald Prize for portraiture.

- Martin Ball – Mark McClean
- Del Kathryn Barton – Vasili Kaliman and contained familiar together within the Dreaming
- John Beard – Janet Laurence (Winner of the 2007 Archibald Prize)
- Danelle Bergstrom – Take two – Jack Thompson (Winner of the 2007 Packing Room Prize)
- Adam Chang – Brian, the dog and the doorway (Portrait of Brian Sherman)
- Zhong Chen – Self portrait
- Peteris Ciemitis – Making sense of place #4 (Portrait of Prof George Seddon)
- Kevin Connor – Portrait of a quiet man, Robert Eadie, painter
- Sam Cranstoun – Peter (Portrait of artist’s father)
- Darren Crothers – Black sheep of the family (Self-portrait)
- Lucy Culliton – Self with subject (domestic science) (Self-portrait)
- Carmen Di Napoli – Go for it (Portrait of Morris Iemma)
- McLean Edwards – Martin Browne
- Esther Erlich – Tim (Portrait of Tim Rogers
- Vivian Falk – A moment with Malcolm (Portrait of Malcolm Turnbull)
- David Griggs – The bleeding hearts club #1 (self portrait)
- Robert Hannaford – Tubes (Self-portrait)
- Daniel Henderson – Lily-Rose (Portrait of artist’s daughter)
- Cherry Hood – Ben Quilty
- Peter Hudson – Words and music – portrait of Paul Kelly
- Jasper Knight – The Honourable Bob Carr
- Zai Kuang – Sarah and the doll
- Sam Leach – A bird flies past Jeff Kennett
- Bill Leak – Portrait of Paul (Portrait of Paul LePetit)
- Mathew Lynn – Neville Wran
- Abbey McCulloch – Toni Collette
- Alexander McKenzie – McLean Edwards
- Lewis Miller – Allan, Matisse and me (Portrait of Allan Mitelman)
- Michael Mucci – The power and the passion (Portrait of Peter Garrett)
- Angus Nivison – Myself (Self-portrait)
- Chris (aka Reg Mombassa) O'Doherty – Self portrait with high pants
- Paulson David – Michael Nelson Jagamara and totem (with Michael Nelson Jagamara)
- Evert Ploeg – George Ellis (Winner of the 2007 People's Choice Award)
- Rodney Pople – Stone cold sober (self portrait)
- Paul Ryan – Fink on the phone (Portrait of Margaret Fink)
- Jenny Sages – Irina Baronova (handing on the baton)
- Peter Smeeth – The young diva – A portrait of Amelia Farrugia
- Sue Taylor – eX and reg
- Ian Waldron – Imants Tillers
- Xu Wang – John Yu and George Soutter
- Greg Warburton – Faith Bandler

== See also ==
- List of Archibald Prize 2006 finalists
- List of Archibald Prize 2008 finalists
- List of Archibald Prize winners
