= List of Archibald Prize 2015 finalists =

This is a list of finalists for the 2015 Archibald Prize for portraiture. As the images are copyrighted, an external link to an image has been listed where available (listed is Artist – Title).

- Adam Alcorn – Alice Fraser
- John Beard – Bill
- Richard Bell – Me
- Jason Benjamin – I sat by the river. I waited by the road
- Filippa Buttitta – Judy Cassab ‒ portrait of an artist
- Mitch Cairns – Peter Powditch
- Tom Carment – Self-portrait at 60
- Wei Bin Chen – The artist ‒ self-portrait no 6
- Peter Churcher – The last portrait
- Samuel Rush Condon – Jarratt
- Tony Costa – David Fairbairn
- Tony Curran – Luke
- Blak Douglas – Smoke and mirrors (Uncle Max Eulo)
- Marc Etherington – Del Kathryn Barton and Magic Dog
- Carla Fletcher – Jenny Kee
- Prudence Flint – Baby
- Juan Ford – A bungled clairvoyance of William Buckley or Ludwig Leichhardt's most intense moments (I can't decide which, you choose)
- Shaun Gladwell – Mark Donaldson VC (member of the avant-garde)
- Bruno Jean Grasswill – Michael Caton (Winner of the People's Choice Award 2015, Winner of the Packing Room Prize 2015) (Image)
- Tim Gregory – Self-portrait as ancestors
- Leon Hall – Self-portrait
- Robert Hannaford – Robert Hannaford, self-portrait
- Tsering Hannaford – Objet démodé
- Sophia Hewson – Delivered
- Tanja Karl – Laurie
- Matthew Kentmann – Nigel Milsom, Sunday 3 May 2015
- Jeremy Kibel – The portrait of Doctor Dick Quan
- Jessica Le Clerc – Living inside of stories
- Kim Leutwyler – Start the riot
- Stewart MacFarlane – Cory Bernardi
- Angus McDonald – Romanticide ‒ portrait of Abbe May
- Kerry McInnis – Omar Musa, the poetry of unease
- Julian Meagher – Daniel Johns
- Nigel Milsom – Judo house pt 6 (the white bird) portrait of Charles Waterstreet (Winner of the Archibald Prize 2015)
- Guy Morgan – Louise Voigt, CEO Barnardos Australia (after retinal detachment)
- Alicia Mozqueira – Doug Hall
- Jason Phu – Lisa has a much more pleasant face than Glenn. She also doesn't sing horribly while playing a guitar or try to put her cat up a tree while I'm painting her.
- Rodney Pople – Frannie and Brett
- Leslie Rice – Hill End bacchanal (portrait of Luke Sciberras)
- Sally Ross – Eva
- Paul Ryan – Thirteen Noahs
- Andrew Sayers – Portrait of Tim Bonyhady
- Jiawei Shen – How to explain art with a white rabbit
- Kristin Tennyson – Bob Katter, federal MP
- Mirra Whale – Elizabeth
- Marcus Wills – El cabeceo
- Tianli Zu – 'Edmund, your Twomblys are behind you'

== See also ==
- Previous year: List of Archibald Prize 2014 finalists
- Next year: List of Archibald Prize 2016 finalists
- List of Archibald Prize winners
