= List of Archibald Prize 2006 finalists =

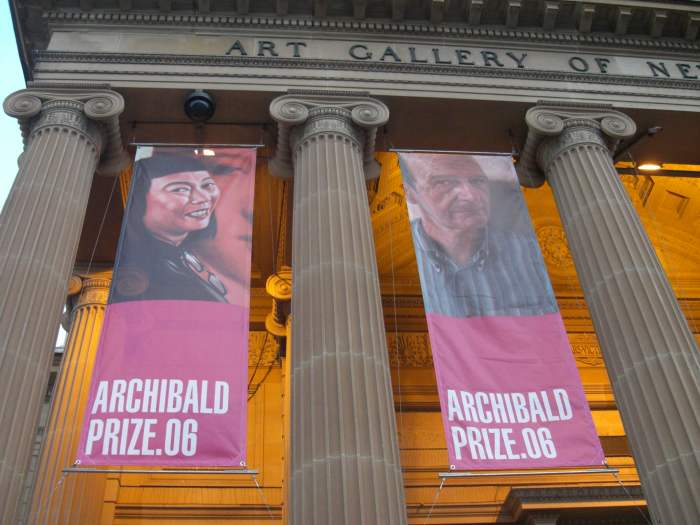
Banners advertising the Archibald Prize outside the Art Gallery of New South Wales with part of Bin Xie's Bright smile on the left, and Paul Jackson's portrait of Garry McDonald on the right

This is a list of finalists for the 2006 Archibald Prize for portraiture (listed is Artist – Title).

- Catherine Abel – Portrait of Julia Leigh
- John Beard – Ken Unsworth
- Danelle Bergstrom – Back to front – Kevin Connor
- Kate Beynon – Year of the dog self-portrait
- Tom Carment – Professor Muecke, portrait of Stephen Muecke
- Jun Chen – Joe Furlonger
- Peter Churcher – Bruce, Linde and me on the road to Guadelupe
- Adam Cullen – Edmund, portrait of Edmund Capon
- Geoffrey Dyer – The Abstractionist Graham Fransella
- McLean Edwards – Cate Blanchett and family
- Prudence Flint – Four wheel drive #2, self-portrait
- Robert Hannaford – Tim Flannery
- Nicholas Harding – Robert Drewe (in the swell) 2006
- Weaver Jack – Weaver Jack in Lungarung, self-portrait
- Paul Jackson – Garry McDonald "All the world's a stage..." (Winner of the 2006 People's Choice Award)
- Jasper Knight – Sir Harold Knight KBE DSC
- Kerrie Lester – Phillip Noyce – in the picture
- Michael Mucci – A working class man portrait of Scott Cam (Winner of the 2006 Packing Room Prize)
- Paul Newton – Portrait of Pat Corrigan
- Josonia Palaitis – Justice Michael Kirby
- Rodney Pople – Artist and Curator, after Gainsborough
- Ben Quilty – Cullen – before and after
- Craig Ruddy – Self-portrait – into the box
- Paul Ryan – Nicholas in Nowra, portrait of Nicholas Harding
- Jenny Sages – Hossein Valamanesh
- Gillie and Marc Schattner – John and his black dog, portrait of John Konrads
- Jiawei Shen – This is not a photo, portrait of Greg Weight
- Peter Smeeth – Clover Moore with Sheba and Bruno
- Kathleen Vafiadis – Julia, portrait of Julia Gillard
- Craig Waddell – Portrait of JC, portrait of Jessie Cacchillo
- John R. Walker – Martin Armiger
- Greg Warburton – Jim Conway
- Marcus Wills – The Paul Juraszek Monolith (after Marcus Gheeraerts) (Winner of the Archibald Prize)
- Bin Xie – Bright smile, portrait of Lindy Lee
- Huihai Xie – A groom, portrait of Liu Yang
- Michael Zavros – Michael Zavros can't paint / the wind is whistling through the house, self-portrait

== See also ==
- Previous year: List of Archibald Prize 2005 finalists
- Next year: List of Archibald Prize 2007 finalists
- List of Archibald Prize winners
