= List of Archibald Prize 2008 finalists =

This is a list of finalists for the 2008 Archibald Prize for portraiture. As the images are copyrighted, an external link to an image has been listed where available (listed is Artist – Title).

- Martin Ball – Neil Finn (Winner of the Packing Room Prize 2008) Image
- Phillip Barnes – Black: White: Red all over (portrait of Red Symons)
- Del Kathryn Barton – You are what is most beautiful about me, a self portrait with Kell and Arella (Winner of the Archibald Prize 2008) Image
- Anthony Bennett – Portrait of Jon Farriss in a Kylie T-shirt
- Danelle Bergstrom – Two movements – Peter Sculthorpe
- Roger Boreham – Dad, what a smile (portrait of his father)
- Eolo Bottaro – The Archibald
- Joanna Braithwaite – Chook, chook, chook (self-portrait)
- David Bromley – Louise Olsen
- Jun Chen – Ian Smith
- Zhong Chen – Nicholas Harding
- Zhansui Kordelya Chi – Julius (portrait of Julius Reade)
- Peteris Ciemitis – Grabowsky (portrait of Paul Grabowsky)
- James Cochran – Akira (portrait of Akira Isogawa)
- Yvette Coppersmith – In the garland (portrait of Paul Capsis)
- Richard Dunlop – Tim Olsen: the man in black
- Evans Neil – Blue days, black nights (self-portrait)
- Vincent Fantauzzo – Heath (portrait of Heath Ledger) (Winner of the People's Choice Award 2008) Image
- Hong Fu – Dr Joseph Brown Image
- Robert Hannaford – Alison Mitchell (portrait of artist's wife)
- Zai Kuang – The sisters – Celia and Julia
- Sam Leach – Self in uniform (self-portrait)
- Barry McCann – Simpatico (portrait of Maggie Beer and Simon Bryant)
- Neil McIrvine – David Disher
- Alexander McKenzie – Sarah Blasko
- Lewis Miller – Tom Lowenstein
- Anna Minardo – The question (portrait of Bryan Dawe)
- Paul Newton – Portrait of Donald McDonald AC
- John Phillips – Wendy after two cups of coffee (portrait of Wendy Whiteley) Image
- Rodney Pople – Art is what you can get away with (self portrait)
- James Powditch – Aden Young in 'Once upon a time in the inner west'
- Ben Quilty – Self-portrait after Madrid
- Leslie Rice – Quartered, drawn and hung: Adam Cullen on public display
- Ryan Paul – Peter Booth, study with Cuban
- Jenny Sages – Anita and Luca (portrait of Anita and Luca Belgiorno-Nettis)
- Song Ling – Angelina Pwerle
- Nick Stathopoulos – At the movies with David Stratton (aka The big sleep)
- Xu Wang – Nick Waterlow
- Jan Williamson – Sue McPherson – artist
- Yi Wang – Long hair (self-portrait)

== See also ==
- Previous year: List of Archibald Prize 2007 finalists
- Next year: List of Archibald Prize 2009 finalists
- List of Archibald Prize winners
