= Karen Woodbury Gallery =

Coordinates: 37°49′43″S 144°59′53″E

Karen Woodbury Gallery was a commercial art gallery in Victoria, Australia that operated from 2004 to 2016.

== History ==
The gallery was opened in 2004 on the ground floor of 4 Albert Street in Richmond by its namesake director Karen Woodbury. By 2009 the gallery was representing a range of contemporary Australian and New Zealand artists, and to open a second exhibition space expanded to level one of the building.

By 2013 following rent hikes in her former location, the gallery was one of several in a growing arts hub on Flinders Lane in Melbourne.

In 2015 the gallery participated in an art fair, "Spring 1883", at the Establishment Hotel.

In 2016, Woodbury closed the gallery and began to operate as a fine arts consultant.

== Artists ==
Artists represented by the Karen Woodbury Gallery include Del Kathryn Barton, Cathy Blanchflower, Robert Boynes, Jane Burton, Michael Cusack, Michael Doolan, McLean Edwards, Kate Ellis, Marie Hagerty, Titania Henderson, Sam Jinks, Locust Jones, Elisabeth Kruger, Alice Lang, Rhys Lee, Fiona Lowry, Magda Matwiejew, eX de Medici, Lara Merrett, Jonathan Nichols, Simon Obarzanek, Derek O'Connor, John Pule, Lisa Roet, Kate Rohde, Alex Spremberg, Heather B. Swann, Monika Tichacek and Philip Wolfhagen.

== Selected exhibitions ==
- Dinosaur Designs, 2014
- Jane Burton, "In Other Bodies", 2014
- Peter Booth, 2015
