= List of Archibald Prize 2009 finalists =

This is a list of finalists for the 2009 Archibald Prize for portraiture (listed is Artist – Title).

- Anthony Bennett – self-portrait in the bathroom discussing beauty, bukowski and brett whiteley with my ex, now a stripper, who likes to dress as wonder woman
- Ann Cape – Lucy & friend
- Adam Chang – Spirit of an ancient culture
- Mike Chavez – Portrait of a bad muthaf***a
- Jun Chen – Ray Hughes and five other moods
- Zhansui Kordelya Chi – Good morning, this is Neil Mitchell
- Yvette Coppersmith – John Safran
- Sam Cranstoun – Gyton
- Leeanne Crisp – Considering Persephone. Portrait of Gay Bilson
- Ngaire Devenport – Ken Done
- Vincent Fantauzzo – Brandon (Brandon Walters) (Winner of the People's Choice Award)
- Hong Fu – Dame Elisabeth Murdoch
- David Griggs – Zoloft nation (self-portrait)
- Peter Hanley – Remembering Titian
- Robert Hannaford – Self-portrait
- Nicholas Harding – Margaret Whitlam
- Cherry Hood – David Helfgott
- Paul Jackson – Flacco's chariot (Paul Livingston) (Winner of the Packing Room Prize)
- Jasper Knight – Jasper Knight
- Richard Larter – Portrait of Nell
- Sam Leach – Marcia Langton
- Mathew Lynn – Heiress
- Abbey McCulloch – Nell
- Angus McDonald – Beyond
- Alexander McKenzie – Richard Clapton
- Guy Maestri – Geoffrey Gurrumul Yunupingu (Winner of the Archibald Prize)
- Nick Mourtzakis – A portrait of Alex Wodak
- Richard Onn – Coupe SX010F
- David Paulson & Michael Nelson Tjakamarra – Michael Nelson Jagamarra & singing rain story
- James Powditch – Peter Powditch is a dead man smoking
- Ben Quilty – Jimmy Barnes – there but for the grace of God no. 2
- Megan Roodenrys – Waiting for the day
- Paul Ryan – Mountain of Tom
- Jenny Sages – Heidi & Sarah-Jane ‘parallel lives’
- Megan Seres – The rest is silence (Brendan Cowell as Hamlet)
- Garry Shead & Adrienne Levenson – Soffritto di Lucio
- Mark Thompson – Greta Scacchi as Queen Elizabeth in Mary Stuart
- Jan Williamson – Nancy Kunoth Petyarr
- Michael Zavros – Ars longa, vita brevis

== See also ==
- Previous year: List of Archibald Prize 2008 finalists
- Next year: List of Archibald Prize 2010 finalists
- List of Archibald Prize winners
