= David Bromley (artist) =

Australian artist (born 1960)

David Bromley (born 1960) is an Australian artist best known for his painting and sculpture, in particular his portraits, and his paintings of children, birds, butterflies and female nudes. He began his career in Adelaide as a potter. He has exhibited widely in Australia, and also in Asia, Europe, Africa and America, and has been a finalist at the Archibald Prize six times.

With his wife Yuge Yu and they own Bromley & Co, which has both galleries and stores in Australia and China.

== Early life ==
Bromley was born in Sheffield, Yorkshire, England, in 1960. His family migrated to Adelaide in South Australia in 1964, spending his early years in Adelaide, and teens and twenties in south-east Queensland.

== Career ==
In his mid-twenties he started working with clay and painting.

In the 2000s he lived in St Kilda, Melbourne, and established a studio in Daylesford in country Victoria, but in 2012 he auctioned his collection and moved to Byron Bay, moving back to Melbourne in 2013.

== Art practice ==
David Bromley's artworks include two major bodies of work – the Boys Own adventure project and the Female Nude series.

He has painted many portraits, including Kate Fischer, Kendall and Kylie Jenner, Miranda Kerr, Kylie Minogue, Poh Ling Yeow, Megan Gale, Kristy Hinze, Hugo Weaving, film director Scott Hicks, weightlifter Dean Lukin, and artist Charles Blackman.

He takes inspiration from childhood books, popular culture and artists such as Andy Warhol, Roy Lichtenstein, and Glen Baxter.

Bromley's nudes portray the female form in contemporary fashion. He makes use of layering and texturing techniques while employing mediums such as metallic paint and leaf combined with black outlines on bold colours.

== Recognition ==
David Bromley has been an Archibald Prize finalist on six occasions:

- 1999: Scott Hicks (film director)
- 2000: Dean Lukin (Olympic gold medal weightlifter)
- 2001: Long Tom (Artist Long Tom Tjapanangka)
- 2002: Charles Blackman (artist)
- 2004 McLean & friends (artist McLean Edwards)
- 2008 Louise Olsen (fashion designer)

Bromley has been listed by the Australian Art Collector magazine as one of Australia's 50 most collectible artists (in 2001, 2002 and 2009).

== In film ==
In 2005, Bromley commissioned author and singer/songwriter Antonella Gambotto-Burke to co-write his series of short films, I Could Be Me, which were narrated by Hugo Weaving and premiered at the Adelaide Festival in 2008. In an essay, Gambotto-Burke noted that, "As scripts are founded on what Alan Alda calls the 'subsurface tectonics of emotion', the result can sometimes be a psychic slam dunk." Bromley, in a separate interview, described the film as "like a kaleidoscope of images and it is run by my poetry and short stories by Antonella. And it has a large animation component."

The 2023 documentary film, Bromley: Light After Dark, was made by filmmaker Sean McDonald over a period of five years, during which he got to know the family well. The film was selected as one of four nominees for the CinefestOZ Film Prize, worth A$100,000, in September 2023.

== Exhibitions ==
Since the mid-1980s, Bromley has had more than 30 solo exhibitions in Australia, as well exhibiting regularly throughout Europe, the UK, South Africa, Asia and the United States.

In 2018, Hepburn Shire Council chief executive officer Aaron van Egmond commissioned artist David Bromley to paint two murals at a cost of $30,000 without consulting council or the public art panel. https://www.hepburnadvocate.com.au/story/5715030/mural-not-pitched-to-public-art-panel/

== Personal life ==
Bromley has suffered from a number of mental health issues, including anxiety and phobias. He has found that "art appeased the voices in his head and helped him find beauty in the world again".

In May 2013 Bromley married Yuge Yu and they formed Bromley & Co. Bromley has seven children: four with previous partners, and three with his wife Yuge. As of 2014 the family were dividing their time between Melbourne and Daylesford.

In 2018 he and his wife bought the heritage-listed Old Castlemaine Gaol.
