= John Avery (lawyer) =

Australian lawyer

- Born: John William Avery; 11 July 1948 (age 78); St. Helens, Tasmania, Australia
- Occupations: Barrister; Solicitor
- Years active: 1971–2008
- Known for: Representing mass murderer Martin Bryant

John William Avery (born 11 July 1948) is an Australian former barrister based in Hobart, Tasmania. Avery notably represented the perpetrator of the Port Arthur Massacre, Martin Bryant during pre-trial and sentencing proceedings before the Supreme Court of Tasmania in 1996, before himself being sentenced in the same court for misappropriation and stealing from clients of his firm in 2008.

== Early life and education ==
Avery was born in St Helens, Tasmania. He was educated at Launceston Church Grammar School from 1961 to 1966 and the University of Tasmania, where he graduated Bachelor of Laws in 1971 and Master of Business in 2013. He was admitted as a Barrister and Solicitor of the Supreme Court of Tasmania on 1 February 1972. He worked initially as an employee of a private law firm. He then established his own practice, John W Avery Barristers and Solicitors, later Avery Keal and Avery Partners, practising in criminal law and civil litigation.

== Representation of Martin Bryant ==
In 1996 Avery represented Martin Bryant for the shooting murders of 35 people at Port Arthur on 28–29 April 1996. He is widely regarded as the person responsible for persuading Bryant to plead guilty to each of the charges of murder that had been alleged against him, saying that he brought Bryant to the decision to plead guilty by encouraging him to draw pictures of his actions on 28–29 April 1996 in order to avoid "a show trial, a circus, a pantomime".

== Sentencing and imprisonment ==
On 3 September 2008 Avery was arraigned in the Supreme Court of Tasmania before Chief Justice Ewan Crawford on an indictment alleging one count of misappropriation as a company officer and 133 counts of stealing. Sentencing Avery, Chief Justice Crawford said:

He carried out far more dishonest transactions than the number of charges might indicate. For example, count 1 has 46 particulars, and in fact involves about 49 cheques he fraudulently drew on his legal firm's bank account on various dates between January 2003 and March 2006. The 129 counts of stealing involve approximately 235 thefts of money between May 2000 and April 2006. They came to an end when his wrongdoing was detected by a financial manager at his legal firm in conjunction with his partner.

I was told that the total amount of his misappropriations and thefts was $512,218.78.

...

The cause of his crimes seems to be that he was living far beyond his means. The Court was told that his income was about $150,000 per annum, a sum well above what most of the community, and I am sure most of his clients, could attain. One of his excesses was the accumulation of works of art. He acquired many of them with the money he dishonestly took from others. It is, as the Director submitted, a plain case of greed and not need.

— Chief Justice Crawford, R v Avery, Comments on Passing Sentence from 18 September 2008

In mitigation, Avery's counsel, David Gunson, SC, had told the court that during his representation of Bryant, Avery had "found the pressures of the media on him was enormous", and that Avery "had described his life after the case as akin to an AFL footballer going back to playing for a country team".

Avery was sentenced to 4 years and 6 months from 3 September 2008, without parole for 2 years and 3 months, and by 28 September 2012 he had been released from jail.

Avery was forced out of the Avery Partners partnership in 2008 when his stealing and misappropriation came to light and his license to practice law was revoked.

== Archibald Prize ==
In 2010, Avery was the subject of an entry for the Archibald Prize by Hobart artist Stewart MacFarlane, entitled The Collector.
