= List of Archibald Prize 2010 finalists =

This is a list of finalists for the 2010 Archibald Prize for portraiture (listed is Artist – Title).

- Giles Alexander – The alternative ambassadors (Professors Ross Garnaut & Martin Green)
- Martin Ball – Jacqueline Fahey
- Kate Beynon – Self portrait with guardian spirits
- Shane Bowden and Dean Reilly – I wake up with Today!
- Adam Chang – Two eyes – closing to open (Simeon Kronenberg)
- Kordelya Chi – Mr Walker
- Kevin Connor – Self portrait
- Adam Cullen – Gareth at the country fair
- Marc de Jong – Janice Petersen
- McLean Edwards – Tim Storrier
- Carla Fletcher – C. W. Stoneking
- Robert Hannaford – Malcolm Fraser
- Cherry Hood – Michael Zavros
- Peter Clifton Kendall – Underdog
- Jasper Knight – Bill Wright AM
- Sam Leach – Tim Minchin (Winner of the Archibald Prize)
- Robert Malherbe – The squire – portrait of Luke Sciberras
- Alexander McKenzie – Andrew Upton
- Nigel Milsom – Adam Cullen (bird as prophet)
- James Money – The Lord Mayor of Melbourne
- Nafisa – Glenn in black & white (Winner of the Packing Room Prize)
- Paul Newton – Self portrait #2 – dark night of the soul
- Khue Nguyen – Unleashed
- Christine O’Hagan – Kate Ceberano
- Rodney Pople – Stelarc triptych
- Victor Rubin – John Olsen – A diptych – part I seated: part II in his bath
- Craig Ruddy – The prince of darkness – Warwick Thornton (Winner of the People's Choice Award)
- Paul Ryan – Danie Mellor, true blue country
- Peter Smeeth – Peter FitzSimons, author
- Ian Smith – Keith Looby alfresco
- Greg Somers – Self portrait with the picture of dory in grey
- Nick Stathopoulos – The bequest
- Yi Wang – Bishop Elliott and Lady Jacqueline
- Apple Yin – The previous life

== See also ==
- Previous year: List of Archibald Prize 2009 finalists
- Next year: List of Archibald Prize 2011 finalists
- List of Archibald Prize winners
