= Alexander McKenzie (artist) =

Australian artist

- Born: 1971 (age 54–55); Sydney, Australia
- Education: Julian Ashton Art School
- Known for: Painting, contemporary art
- Notable work: 20 solo exhibitions in both Australia and the United Kingdom since 1996
- Website: Alexander McKenzie

Alexander McKenzie (born 1971 in Sydney) is an Australian contemporary artist.

== Biography ==
The son of Scottish migrants, McKenzie knew he would become a painter from the earliest years and had his own purpose-built art studio at home from the age of eleven. After starting out at City Art Institute, now called (COFA) University of New South Wales College of Fine Arts, he dropped out, citing that he wasn't interested in exploring many other disciplines, he just wanted to get on with painting. Shortly after leaving City Art Institute he won the Brett Whiteley Scholarship to study at the Julian Ashton Art School, graduating in 1994. Between 1995 and 2002 he studied and travelled throughout England, Ireland, France, Scotland and Italy.

== Landscapes ==
His landscape paintings have been described as "aesthetically reminiscent of 15th century Dutch Masters – with contemporary motifs... reflecting the human journey that transpires time and place." "...cinematic in the same way that the works of painters such as Caspar David Friedrich or Eugene von Guerard speak across the centuries to a contemporary visual imagination." His work has been part of solo and group exhibitions in Australia, Hong Kong, Scotland, Ireland and the United States and is part of corporate and private collections across the globe.

In 2013 he was commissioned by the Australian War Memorial to paint a ten by three-metre background as part of the World War I centenary commemorations. The diorama depicts the 1918 Battle of Semakh that unfolded on the Sea of Galilee's southern shore in the last months of the Sinai and Palestine campaign. This new background (originally painted by Louis McCubbin in 1926 -1927) is a continuation of a vision first outlined by the memorial's founder Charles Bean back in 1918, where in a letter to memorial director John Treloar, he insisted that the dioramas not be just a purely didactic display – "not a sort of Noah’s ark model… but a real picture, with the atmosphere, the gradations of shade and colour, the feeling of the scene, created by an artist".

He is a finalist eight times of the Wynne Prize held at the Art Gallery of New South Wales.

- (2014) Man moves mountain
- (2012) The island is a mighty fortress.
- (2011) Firestarter.
- (2010) Bushfire season.
- (2008) Bonsai, the big lesson.
- (2007) The double island.
- (2006) Red lantern.
- (2005) Island hopping.

== Portraits ==
Although he is known internationally as a landscape artist, he is also a finalist six times of the Archibald Prize, regarded by many as the most important portraiture prize in Australia.

- (2013) Toni Collette – oil on linen.
- (2011) Richard Roxburgh – oil on linen.
- (2010) Andrew Upton – oil on linen.
- (2009) Richard Clapton – oil on linen.
- (2008) Sarah Blasko – oil on linen.
- (2007) McLean Edwards – oil on linen.

And a finalist twice of the Doug Moran National Portrait Prize.

- (2014) Matt Corby.
- (2012) Fight‘n Euan Macleod.
