= Hilarie Mais =

Hilarie Mais (born 1952) is a British/Australian artist. She primarily works with as a contemporary abstract painter and sculptor.

== Early life and education ==
Mais was born Leeds, in the United Kingdom, in 1952. She attended the Jacob Kramer School of Art in 1969 and then studied at the Bradford School of Art in 1970 and 1971, the Winchester School of Art from 1971 to 1974 and the Slade School of Fine Art at the University College London from 1975 to 1977.

== Career ==
Mais held her first solo exhibition in 1977. She travelled to Australia in 1981 and has since exhibited at the Biennale of Sydney and the Australian Sculpture Triennial.

Mais's work has been influenced by the abstract movement in the 1960s, especially English constructivism, and later American minimalism, such as the work of Agnes Martin.

== Style ==
Mais's work often uses grid-like patterns to explore "abstract visualisation". She seeks to merge a rigid grid structure with more organic natural forms. The geometric patterns repeat and expand outwards, mimicking the process of growth, according to the artist. Mais works alone, without assistants or fabrication. Her works are highly detailed, often with hundreds of tiny screws holding each part of the sculpture in place. She also uses colour to accentuate and emphasise these details. Her piece Nomad (2006–12) utilised multitudes of tiny components in different colours to produce a colour spectrum.

In more recent years, Mais has experimented with making designs from waste plastic.

== Personal ==
Mais has lived and worked in Sydney, New York and the United Kingdom. She was married to the curator and artist William Wright, who died in 2014. Together they established the influential commercial gallery Mais Wright, located in East Sydney, which Mais continues to run.

A portrait of Mais by John Beard was a finalist for the 2005 Archibald Prize.
