= Mertim Gokalp =

Australian painter (born 1981)

- Born: Mertim Gokalp; 1981 (age 44–45)
- Known for: Portrait and figure painter
- Website: www.mertim.com.au

Mertim Gokalp (born 1981) is a Turkish-born Australian portrait and figure painter. He was a finalist for the Archibald Prize in 2013 with his portrait of Bille Brown, and he was a finalist in the Doug Moran National Portrait Prize in 2015 with his painting "The Sacrifice of the Model".

== Life and work ==
Gokalp was born in Ankara, Turkey. He moved to Sydney in 2009 and is now part of an artist run initiative Project 504, working from his studio in North Sydney. Mertim Gokalp has received a Distinguished Talent Visa from the Australian Government, allowing him to live and work in Australia.

== Education ==
Gokalp holds a Bachelor of Fine Arts degree from Mimar Sinan Fine Arts University, Istanbul.

== Past exhibitions ==
Mertim Gokalp has exhibited in major art prizes and galleries in Australia. Most recently, he won the Hunters Hill Art Prize 2018 with his portrait of celebrity chef Manu Feildel – "Bon Appetit". He also won the Kennedy Prize in 2017 with another portrait of Manu Feildel, and he has been selected into the Salon des Refuses and exhibited in the S. H. Ervin Gallery. Gokalp's painting, the Sacrifice of the Model – a contemporary re-take of Caravaggio's Entombment of the Christ, has been selected into the Doug Moran National Portrait Prize 2015 and has been exhibited in the Juniper Hall in Paddington.

In 2014, Gokalp had exhibited in the Contemporary Istanbul and had a solo show "The Descendants", in the Rocks Discovery Museum. Mertim's self-portrait "I am a bit mad, but that is ok!", which was a semi-finalist in the Doug Moran National Portrait Prize 2013, has been selected amongst many Australian portrait artists to be exhibited at the Australian Embassy in Washington DC, U.S.A.

In May 2014, two of Gokalp's paintings, "Mama keeps me warm" and "Bille Brown in a Turkish Bath", were selected to be exhibited by Angus Trumble in the Glencore Percival Portrait Prize. This is the artist's first time exhibiting his works in Queensland.

In March 2013, Gokalp's portrait of the late Bille Brown, an Australian stage, film, television actor, and playwright, was announced as one of the finalists in the Archibald Prize. It was also exhibited in the NSW Parliament House in July 2013 as a part of the "Multicultural Australia" exhibition.
