= Susan Wakil =

Romanian businesswoman and philanthropist (1933–2018)

Susan Wakil AO
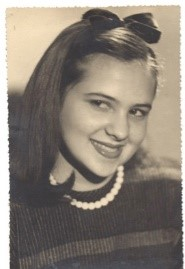
- Young Susan Wakil aged 16, 1949
- Born: 1933; Bessarabia, Romania
- Died: 28 May 2018 (84); Sydney, Australia
- Occupation: Philanthropy
- Spouse: Isaac Wakil

Susan Wakil AO (1933 – 28 May 2018) was a Romanian businesswoman, a charity supporter and philanthropist who supported health, education and the arts in Australia.

== Biography ==
Susan Wakil was born in Bessarabia in 1933. She came to Australia in 1949, having left Romania with her aunt, fleeing the Soviet government and war-torn Eastern Europe. Bessarabia, which today lies within Moldavia and Ukraine, was at that time a disputed territory, with the Soviet Union and Romania both laying claim to the country. Wakil's mother had been taken away to a Soviet concentration camp and did not survive the conflict. Her father was interned in a Siberian gulag.

Wakil came with her aunt to live in Sydney at the age of 15, and was later joined by her father upon his release. As a young girl, she attended the Holy Cross College in Woollahra, where she studied English and bookkeeping. She found work in the fashion industry and through this she met her future husband, Isaac Wakil.

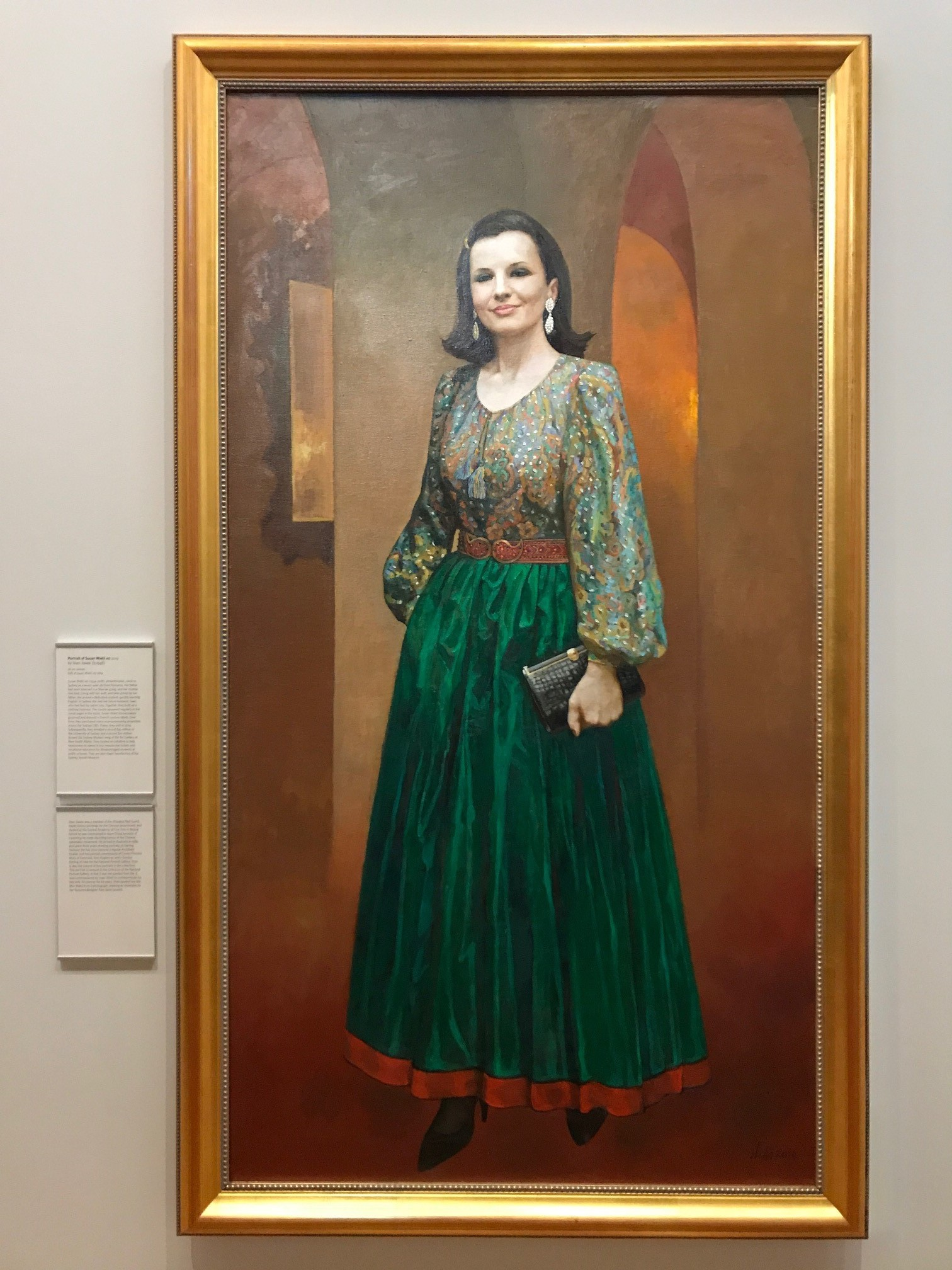
Portrait of Susan Wakil by Shen Jiawei, in the National Portrait Gallery, Canberra

Isaac Wakil was born in Baghdad in 1927 and arrived in Australia to escape Iraq after the violence of the Farhud in 1941. Wakil and Isaac married in 1953. They became successful entrepreneurs in the clothing trade and as their business flourished, they invested in many properties across the Sydney CBD and Pyrmont.

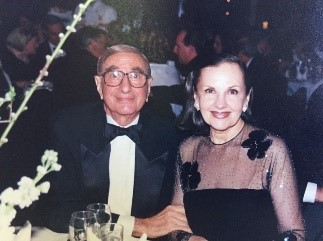
Susan and Isaac Wakil Black and White Ball 1990

The Wakils were generous philanthropists throughout their careers, providing significant support to Opera Australia, the Art Gallery of New South Wales, St Vincent’s Hospital and the Sydney Jewish Museum, to a variety of educational, arts and charity organisations and regularly appearing in the social pages of many newspapers and magazines. For many years Wakil enjoyed a busy social calendar which included countless hours of charity work. She joined the Black and White Committee in 1971 and was made Vice President in 1980, a position she held for the rest of her life. The Susan and Isaac Wakil Foundation was established in 2014.

In 2017, both Wakil and Isaac were appointed Officers of the Order of Australia for "distinguished service to the community through a range of philanthropic endeavours, and for their support of charitable, educational and cultural organisations".

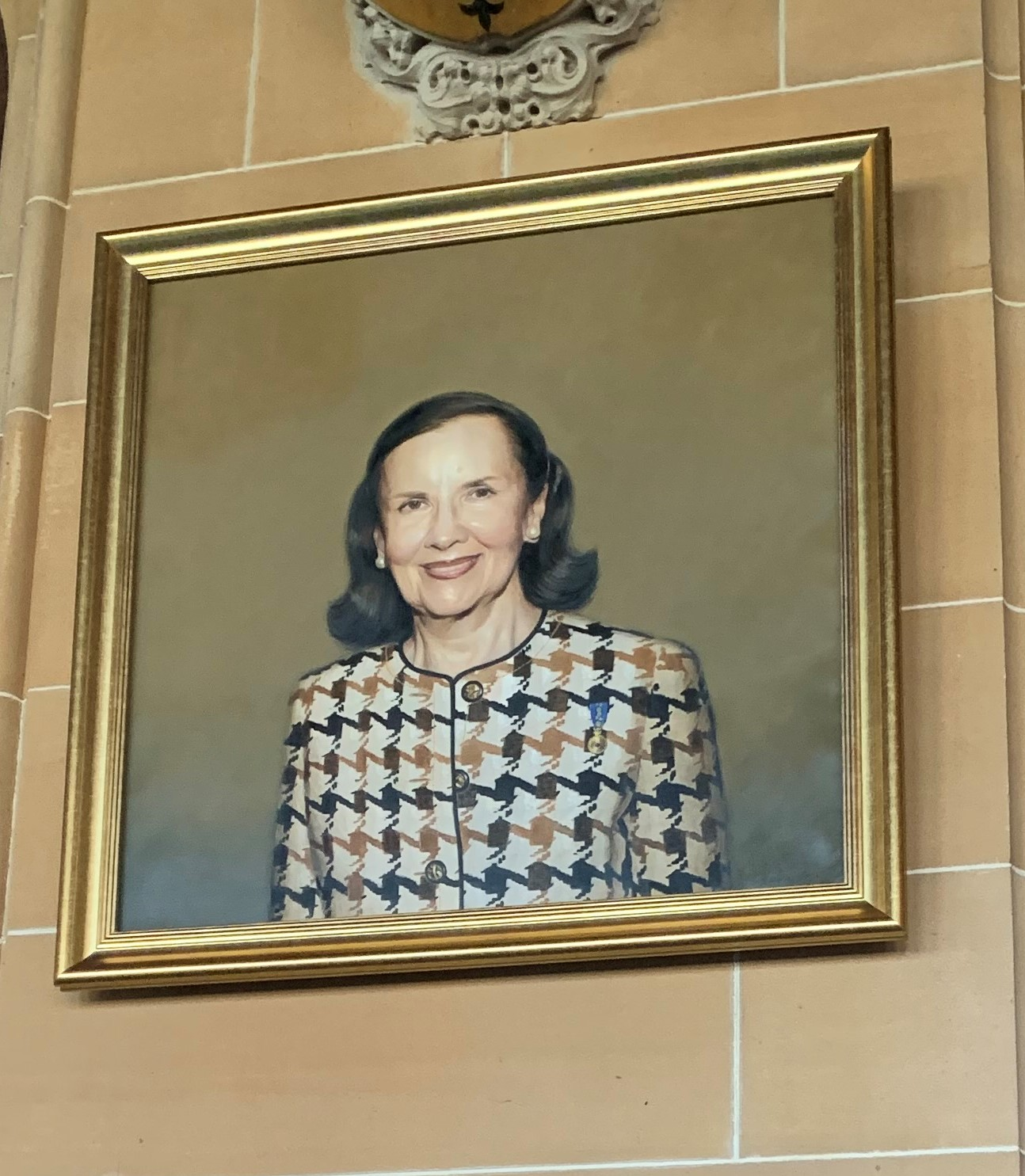
Portrait of Susan Wakil by Tsering Hannaford, in the MacLaurin Hall, the University of Sydney

Wakil died on 28 May 2018.

== Philanthropy ==
The Susan and Isaac Wakil Foundation was established In 2014. The Wakils began selling many of their property investments and announced their intention to establish a charitable foundation.

In 2015, a gift of $10.8 million was made to the University of Sydney to provide 12 perpetual nursing scholarships a year, half of them to support regional, rural or Aboriginal or Torres Strait Islanders. A few months later they made a donation of $35 million to support the construction of the Susan Wakil Health Building, which unites the medicine and health disciplines in one purpose-built facility at the University of Sydney.

The Art Gallery of New South Wales received a $24 million donation to the Sydney Modern project, which was the biggest cash donation in the institution’s history. Additionally, Wakil and Isaac provided guidance and a donation to fund an Opera Australia initiative to help first-time opera-goers to see performances at the Sydney Opera House.

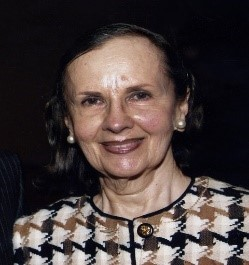
Susan Wakil

The Wakils were also major benefactors of the Sydney Jewish Museum, supporting the Fund for Jewish Higher Education, making a significant contribution to tertiary-level Jewish studies and teacher training at the University of Sydney.

From 2015, through the Public Education Foundation, the Wakils funded scholarships for disadvantaged graduates of public schools undertaking tertiary or vocational education.

In 2022, the Susan and Isaac Wakil Foundation donated $20 million to establish the Isaac Wakil Biomedical Building, one of three buildings that will make up the Sydney Biomedical Accelerator complex due to open from 2026. The Isaac Wakil Biomedical Building will stand beside and connect to the Susan Wakil Health Building. The Sydney Biomedical Accelerator will be 36,000m^{2} health, education, and research precinct co-located at Royal Prince Alfred Hospital and the University of Sydney's Camperdown campuses, within the Tech Central precinct.

Isaac Wakil has spoken of the joy the pair took in contributing to Australian cultural life. "Australia is a great country," he said when their gift to the University of Sydney Susan Wakil School of Nursing and Midwifery was announced. "It's a good feeling to give something back."

== In Memory ==
In memory of his wife, in 2019 Isaac commissioned Chinese-Australian artist Shen Jiawei to paint a portrait of Susan, in which she wore a gown of one of her favoured designers, Yves St Laurent. The portrait was donated to the National Portrait Gallery in Canberra.

Julian Leeser, MP for Berowra, acknowledged Wakil as one of Australia’s greatest benefactors in the grievance debate in Parliament, Wednesday 27 June 2018.
