= Kate Leslie =

Australian anaesthetist

Kate Leslie AO FAHMS

Personal details
- Born: Katherine Leslie; 1962 (age 63–64) Melbourne, Victoria, Australia
- Occupation: Anaesthetist

Katherine Leslie is an Australian anaesthetist, medical practitioner, and medical researcher. She is head of research in the Department of Anaesthesia and Pain Management at the Royal Melbourne Hospital (RMH). Leslie was the first anaesthetist to be honoured with a Doctor of Medical Science (Honoris Causa) by the University of Melbourne in 2017.

== Early life and education ==
Kate Leslie was born in 1962 in Melbourne, Australia as the youngest of three daughters. Growing up in Hawthorn, she attended Auburn Primary School and Camberwell High School before studying medicine at the University of Melbourne. Leslie undertook anaesthesia training in both Melbourne and San Francisco. Following her formal training, she was awarded Fellowship of the Australian and New Zealand College of Anaesthetists in 1993.

== Career ==
Leslie is head of research in the Department of Anaesthesia and Pain Management at RMH. Her professional area is within anaesthesia and perioperative medicine, with her clinical interests including anaesthesia for neurosurgery, colorectal and trauma surgery, and sedation for gastrointestinal endoscopy.

Leslie served a two-year term as ANZCA President from 2012 to 2014 and during this time she was also a member of the Committee of Presidents of Medical Colleges, and its chair from 2011 to 2013. Leslie is an Honorary Professorial Fellow in the Anaesthesia Perioperative and Pain Medicine Unit, Melbourne Medical School, and Department of Pharmacology and Therapeutics at the University of Melbourne. She is also an Honorary Adjunct Professor, Department of Epidemiology and Preventive Medicine at Monash University.

Leslie is on the editorial board of Anesthesia and Analgesia, the British Journal of Anaesthesia and Anesthesiology and is one of six editors of Miller’s Anesthesia (9th edition).

== Recognition and awards ==
Andrew Mezei's painting Morpheus, a portrait of Kate Leslie, was nominated as a finalist for the Archibald Prize 2014. (image)

=== List of awards ===
- ASA Boots Young Investigator Award (1989)
- ASA Gilbert Troup Medal (1989)
- Fellowship of the Australian and New Zealand College of Anaesthetists (1993)
- ANZCA Gilbert Brown Prize (1995)
- ANZCA Harry Daly Research Award (1998)
- ANZCA Douglas Joseph Professorship (2005)
- Australian Medical Association Woman in Medicine Award (2014)
- ANZCA Robert Orton Medal (2014)
- Fellow, Australian Academy of Health and Medical Sciences (2015)
- Chairman's Award, Melbourne Health (2015)
- Officer of the Order of Australia (AO) for "distinguished service to medicine in the field of anaesthesia and pain management as a clinician and researcher, to higher education, and to professional medical groups" (2016)
- Doctor of Medical Science (Honoris Causa), University of Melbourne (2017)
