= Bin Xie =

Australian painter

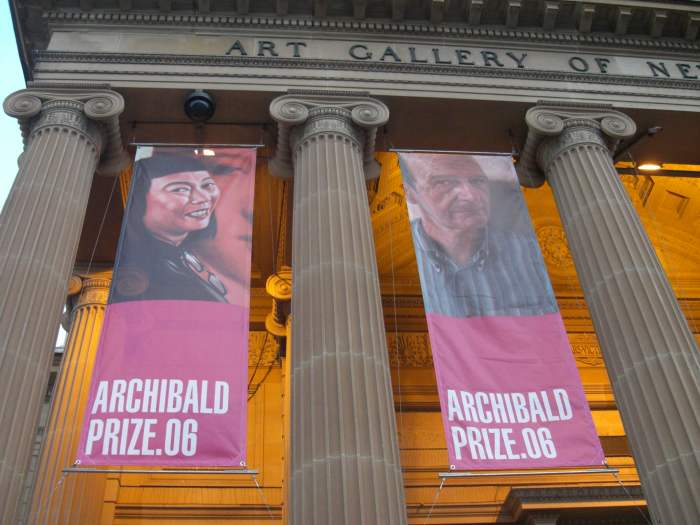
Banners advertising the Archibald Prize outside the Art Gallery of New South Wales with part of Bin Xie's Bright smile on the left, and Paul Jackson's portrait of Garry McDonald on the right

Bin Xie (谢玢; born 1957) is a Chinese-born artist living in Sydney, Australia. She was a finalist in the 2006 Archibald Prize.

== Early life ==
Xie graduated from Chongqing University in 1982 with a bachelor of science degree, and earned a master of science from the same university in 1988. She remained at Chongqing University as a mathematics instructor until 1990, when she moved to Australia. She began painting seriously around 2002, and studied fine arts at the Meadowbank campus of the Northern Sydney Institute of TAFE, from which she received a diploma in 2003. She went on to the Sydney College of the Arts (SCA), graduating in 2006 with a master of studio arts.

== Works ==
Xie's work Bright Smile (a portrait of SCA senior lecturer Lindy Lee), her first entry into the Archibald Prize, was part of a series of ten paintings of Chinese Australian women which Xie did as part of her master's project at SCA. It was chosen as one of the Archibald street banners that year. The work was later acquired by a private collection. Xie's work is also represented in public and private collections in Australia, China, the UK, and the US.

Xie has been exhibiting since 2002, in places such as the Chinese Cultural Centre in Chatswood, the Sydney Antique Centre, Surry Hill, Crossbay Gallery, Eden Gardens, in 2008 in the Paddington Contemporary Art Gallery, and in 2015 at Gallery Lane Cove.
