= List of Archibald Prize 2014 finalists =

This is a list of finalists for the 2014 Archibald Prize for portraiture. As the images are copyrighted, an external link to an image has been listed where available (listed is Artist – Title).

- Abdul Abdullah – I wanted to paint him as a mountain (Portrait of Richard Bell)
- Michael Bales – Butchered (Self-portrait)
- Mike Barnard – You beautiful fighter (Portrait of his mother Judy)
- Phillip Barnes – Anna Meares
- Jason Benjamin – I just wanna dream (Portrait of Tim Rogers)
- Kate Beynon – Sangeeta and Fuji (Portrait of Sangeeta Sandrasegar)
- Natasha Bieniek – Isola (Self-portrait)
- Joanna Braithwaite – Bright spark (Portrait of Colleen McCullough)
- Jandamarra Cadd – Proud (Portrait of Archie Roach)
- Mitch Cairns – Reg Richardson AM
- Eliza Cameron – Nice shootin' cowboy (Portrait of Anson Cameron)
- Peter Churcher – Four self-portraits in a bunch of balloons (Self-portrait)
- Samuel Rush Condon – What I would look like if I was John Safran (Portrait of John Safran)
- Peter Daverington – The Golden City has ceased (Self-portrait)
- Anh Do – Father (Portrait of his father Tam Do)
- Michael Fairweather – Camilla (Portrait of Camilla Rountree)
- Vincent Fantauzzo – All that's good in me (self-portrait as son Luca) (Portrait of his son Luca) (Winner of the People's Choice Award 2014) (Image)
- Carla Fletcher – Dan Sultan
- Juan Ford – Channelling WC Piguenit, startled by a spectacular sunset viewed through a canopy (part tribute to William Charles Piguenit, part self-portrait)
- Joe Furlonger – Self-portrait at Moree (Self-portrait)
- David Griggs – Not a sexpat idiot cowboy painting (Self-portrait)
- Rebecca Hastings – The onesie (Self-portrait)
- Sophia Hewson – Artist kisses subject (Self-portrait with Missy Higgins)
- Alan Jones – Adam (Portrait of Adam Goodes)
- Dapeng Liu – Portrait of Cao Yin on blue-and-green landscape (Portrait of Cao Yin)
- Fiona Lowry – Penelope Seidler (Winner of the Archibald Prize 2014) (Image)
- Mathew Lynn – Swing (after Fragonard, portrait of Ken Unsworth)
- Tim Maguire – Cate, take 1 / Cate, take 2 (Portrait of Cate Blanchett)
- Paul Mallam – The card player (Self-portrait)
- Bridgette McNab – Grace (Portrait of Grace Hellyer)
- Julian Meagher – John Waters – the clouds will cloud (Portrait of John Waters)
- Andrew Mezei – Morpheus (Portrait of Kate Leslie)
- Paul S Miller – Greg (Greg Warburton)
- Paul Newton – Portrait of Frank Lowy AC
- Mia Oatley – Real thing (Portrait of Tim Maguire)
- Nicolee Payne – Fuifui Moimoi
- Jason Phu – Evan on a Sunday morning at the gallery having a ginger tea with some old fat snoring man and some lady pushing someone's annoying crying baby around in a blue pram, and no, you can't smoke here mate (Portrait of Evan Hughes)
- Evert Ploeg – John Schaeffer AO – art collector and philanthropist
- Rodney Pople – Well dressed for a Sydney audience (Portrait of Barry Humphries)
- James Powditch – Citizen Kave (Portrait of Nick Cave)
- Troy Quinliven – Thinking of the next move (Portrait of Rodney Pople)
- Jude Rae – Sarah Peirse
- Sally Ross – Harvey (Portrait of Harvey Miller AO)
- Paul Ryan – Rox (Portrait of Richard Roxburgh)
- Wendy Sharpe – Mr Ash Flanders, actor
- Mariola Smarzak – Wendy (Portrait of Wendy Arnold)
- Tim Storrier – The Member, Dr Sir Leslie Colin Patterson KCB AO (portrait of Sir Les Patterson) (Winner of the Packing Room Prize 2014) (Image)
- Martin Tighe – A familiar stranger (Portrait of Emma Ayers)
- Mirra Whale – Tom Uren
- Lee Wise – Zavros (Portrait of Michael Zavros)
- Heidi Yardley – Julia deVille
- Zoë Young – Torah Bright
- Qiang Zhang – Here (Portrait of Yang Li)
- Salvatore Zofrea – Ms Gladys Berejiklian MP

== See also ==
- Previous year: List of Archibald Prize 2013 finalists
- Next year: List of Archibald Prize 2015 finalists
- List of Archibald Prize winners
