= Lisa Roet =

Australian artist (born 1967)

- Born: 1967 (age 58–59)
- Education: Royal Melbourne Institute of Technology
- Website: https://www.lisaroet.com/

Lisa Roet (born 1967) is an Australian artist who lives and works in Melbourne. She studied at the Royal Melbourne Institute of Technology. In 2005 she received the McClelland Sculpture Prize. The sculpture, White Ape, is now part of the collection of the McClelland Sculpture Park and Gallery.

Roet is interested in the relationship between humans and other primates, which she explores through her bronze sculptures, charcoal drawings, film and photography. She has travelled to remote areas in Borneo for field observations of apes in forests in addition to involving herself in a range of residencies with research centres and major international zoos.

Roet's work is discussed in Alexie Glass-Kantor's book on the artist, Lisa Roet : uncommon observations, and catalogued by Karen Woodbury in, You're so vain : five contemporary sculptors Michael Doolan, Kate Ellis, Lily Hibberd, Lisa Roet, Tim Silver / exhibition concept.

In 2009 Roet created the film Weeping Forest which documents logging in Borneo.

Roet created an inflatable sculpture of a Golden snub-nosed monkey. Versions of this sculpture have been exhibited at Melbourne Town Hall in Australia, Inverleith House in Edinburgh, the Opposite House hotel in Beijing, the Temple House in Chengdu, and the H-Code building in Hong Kong.

== Gallery ==
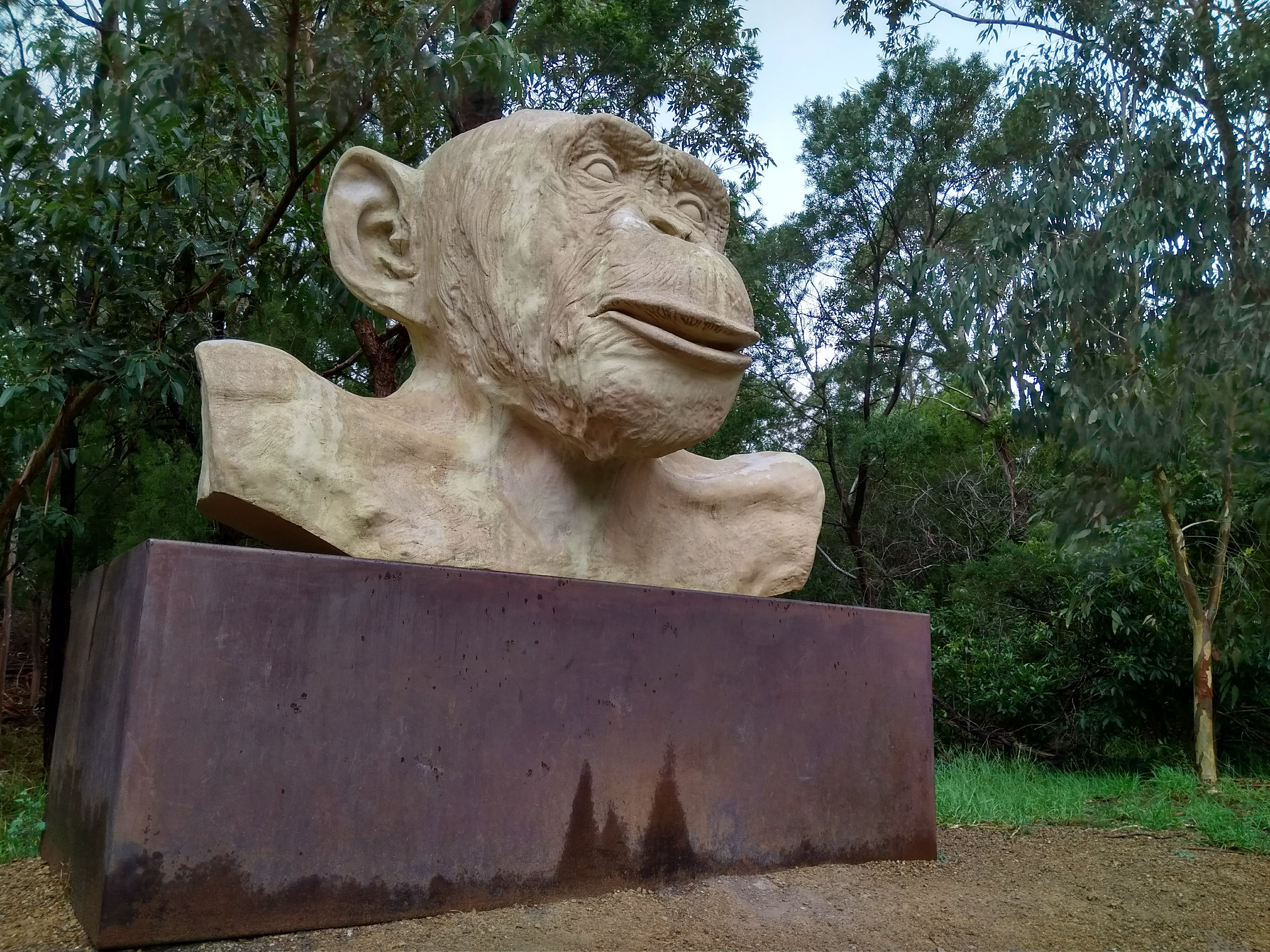
Roet's "White Ape" sculpture, on display in the McClelland Sculpture Park and Gallery.

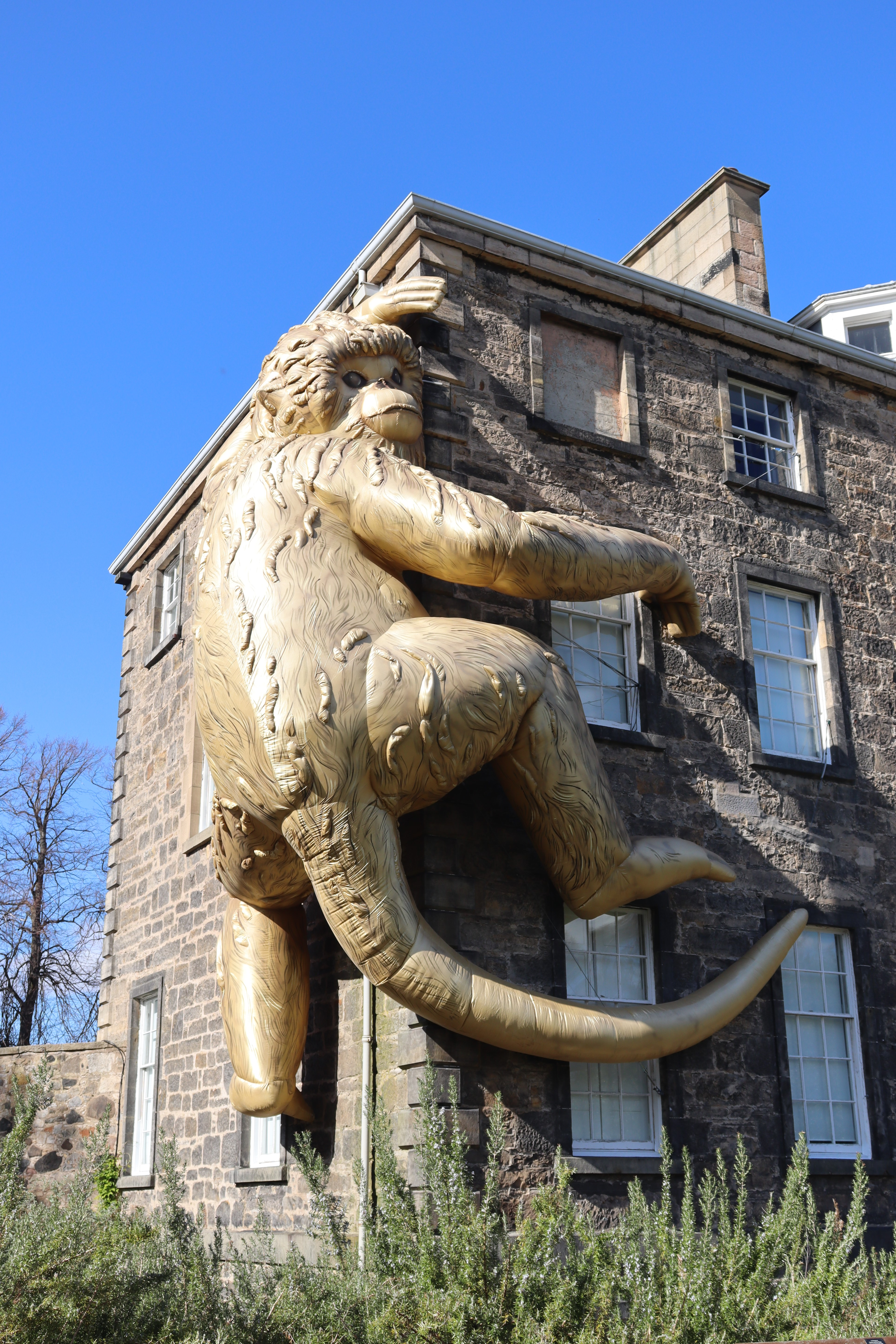
Roet's Golden Monkey installation on Inverleith House in Edinburgh, Scotland.

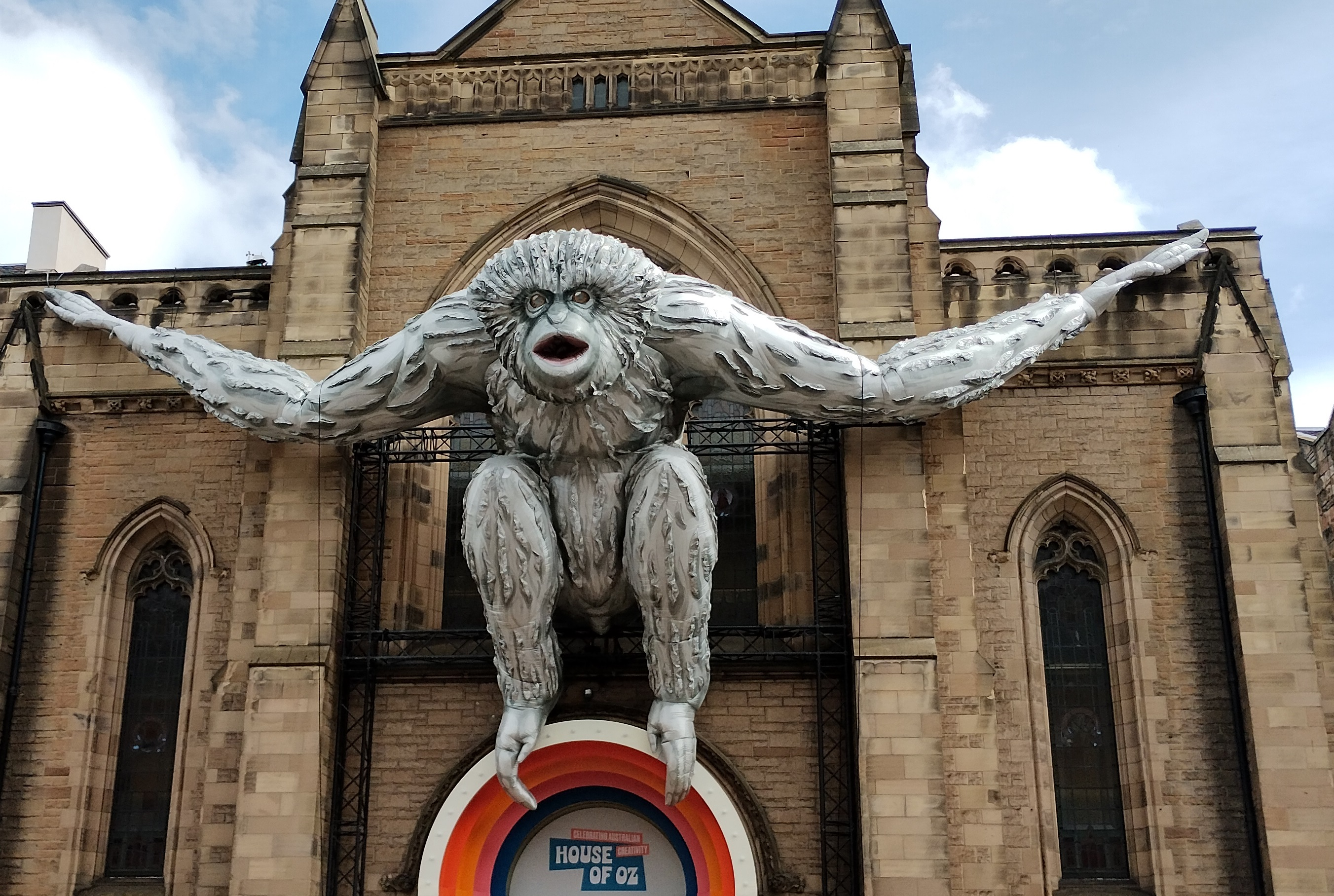
An inflatable gibbon sculpture by Roet, mounted on the King's Hall, Edinburgh as part of the 2023 Edinburgh Festival Fringe.

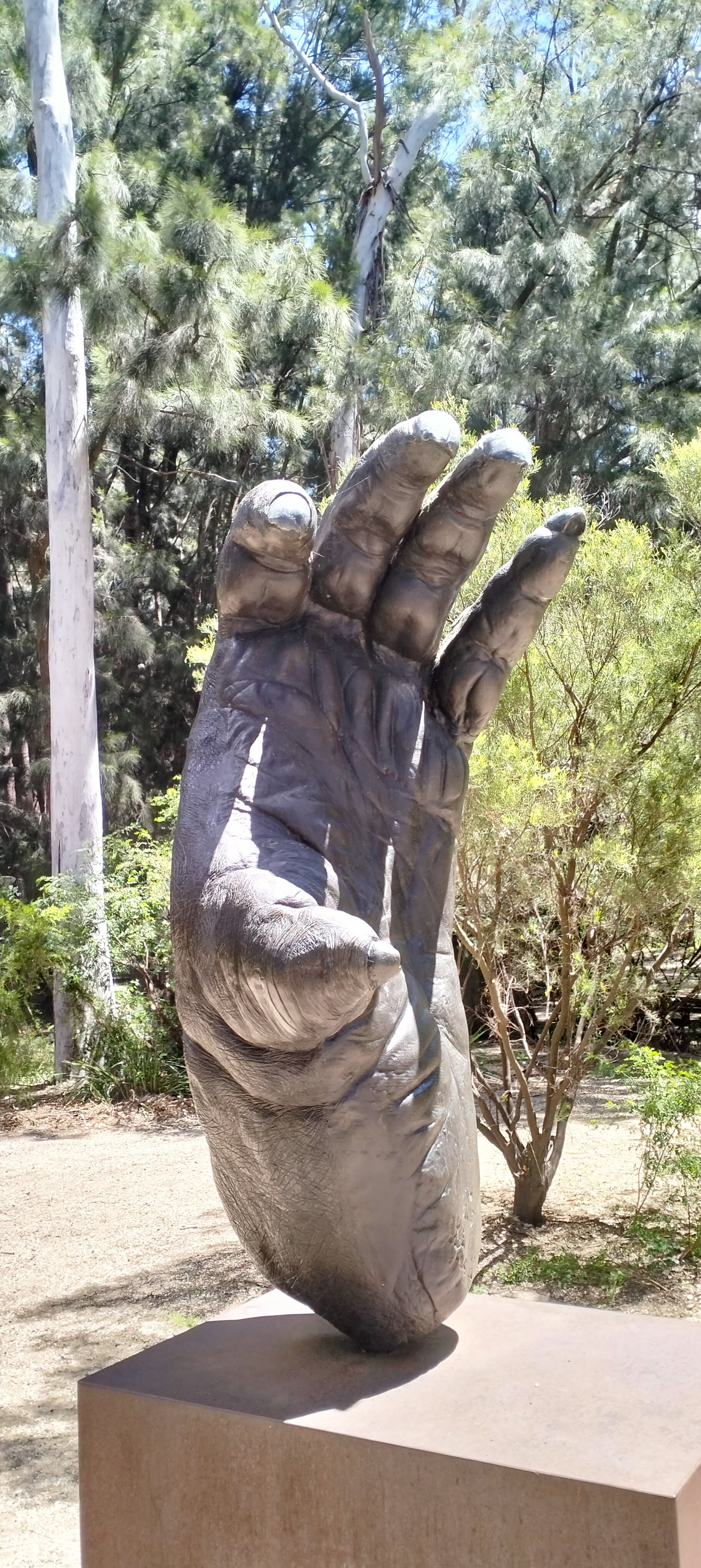
Orangutan foot in Melbourne.
