= Martin Bryant =

Australian mass murderer (born 1967)

- Bryant in 1996
- Born: Martin John Bryant; 7 May 1967 (age 59); Hobart, Tasmania, Australia
- Known for: Perpetrator of the Port Arthur massacre
- Status: Incarcerated
- Convictions: Murder (35 counts); Attempted murder (20 counts); Inflicting grievous bodily harm (3 counts); Inflicting wounds (8 counts); Arson (2 counts)
- Penalty: 35 consecutive life sentences plus 1,652 years without parole

Details
- Date: 28–29 April 1996
- Locations: Port Arthur, Tasmania, Australia
- Killed: 35
- Injured: 23
- Imprisoned at: Risdon Prison

Martin John Bryant (born 7 May 1967) is an Australian convicted mass murderer who perpetrated the Port Arthur massacre on 28 and 29 April 1996, in which he fatally shot 35 people and injured 23 others. He is currently serving 35 life sentences, and 1,652 years without the possibility of parole, at Risdon Prison in Hobart, Tasmania.

== Early life ==
Martin Bryant was born on 7 May 1967 at Queen Alexandra Hospital in Hobart, Tasmania. He was the first child of Maurice and Carleen Bryant. Although his family's home was in Lenah Valley, Bryant spent some of his childhood at their beach home in Carnarvon Bay, adjacent to the Port Arthur Historic Site. In a 2011 interview, his mother recalled that, when he was very young, Bryant was an "annoying" and "different" child who frequently broke his toys. A psychiatrist who examined Bryant told the family that he would never be capable of holding down a job due to his aggravating behavior. In 1979, at age 12, Bryant was hospitalised at Royal Hobart Hospital from an injury caused by a firework accident. While in hospital, he was interviewed by a local television station.

Locals later recalled abnormal behaviour by Bryant, such as pulling the snorkel from another boy while diving and cutting down trees on a neighbour's property. In 1973, at age 5, he started primary school at The Friends' School in Hobart. Bryant was a disruptive and sometimes violent student who suffered severe bullying by other children. He was described by teachers as being distant from reality and unemotional. After Bryant was suspended from New Town Primary School in 1977, psychological assessments noted that he tortured animals. He returned to school the following year with improved behaviour but persisted in teasing younger children. He was transferred to a special education unit at New Town High School in 1980, where he deteriorated both academically and behaviourally throughout his remaining school years.

=== Psychological and psychiatric assessments ===
Descriptions of Bryant's behaviour as an adolescent show that he continued to be disturbed and outlined the possibility of an intellectual disability. When leaving school in 1983, he was assessed for a disability pension by a psychiatrist who wrote: "Cannot read or write. Does a bit of gardening and watches TV ... Only his parents' efforts that prevent further deterioration. Could be schizophrenic and parents face a bleak future with him." Bryant received a disability pension, though he also worked as a handyman and gardener. In an examination after the massacre, forensic psychologist Ian Joblin found Bryant to be borderline mentally disabled with an IQ of 66, equivalent to an 11-year-old.

While awaiting trial, Bryant was examined by court-appointed psychiatrist Ian Sale, who was of the opinion that Bryant "could be regarded as having shown a mixture of conduct disorder, attention deficit hyperactivity and ... Asperger's Syndrome." Psychiatrist Paul Mullen, hired at the request of Bryant's legal counsel, found that he was socially and intellectually impaired. Furthermore, finding that he did not display signs of schizophrenia or a mood disorder, Mullen concluded, "though Mr Bryant was clearly a distressed and disturbed young man he was not mentally ill."

== Adulthood ==
In early 1987, when Bryant was 19, he met 54-year-old Helen Mary Elizabeth Harvey, a bohemian wealthy heiress to a share in the Tattersall's lottery fortune, while looking for new customers for his lawn-mowing service. Harvey, who lived with her mother Hilza, befriended Bryant, who became a regular visitor to her decaying mansion in New Town and assisted with tasks such as feeding the fourteen dogs living inside the mansion and the forty cats living inside her garage. In June 1990, an unidentified person reported Harvey to the health authorities, and medics found both Harvey and her mother in need of urgent hospital treatment. With Harvey suffering from infected ulcers and Hilza with a hip fracture, Hilza was moved into a nursing home and died several weeks later at the age of 79.

A mandatory clean-up order was placed on the mansion, and Bryant's father took long-service leave to assist in cleaning the interior. The local RSPCA unit had to confiscate many animals living in the house. Following the clean-up, Harvey invited Bryant to live with her in the mansion. The odd pair of friends began spending extravagant amounts of money, including the purchase of more than thirty new cars in less than three years. Bryant and Harvey spent most of their time together extensively shopping for various items, usually after having lunch in a local restaurant. Around this time, Bryant was reassessed for his disability pension and a note was attached to the paperwork: "Father protects him from any occasion which might upset him as he continually threatens violence ... Martin tells me he would like to go around shooting people. It would be unsafe to allow Martin out of his parents' control."

In 1991, as a result of no longer being allowed to have animals at the mansion, Bryant and Harvey moved together onto a 29-hectare (72-acre) farm called Taurusville that Harvey had purchased in the small township of Copping. Neighbours recalled that Bryant always carried an air gun and often fired it at tourists as they stopped to buy apples at a stall on the highway. Late at night, he would roam through the surrounding properties firing the gun at dogs when they barked at him. Residents in Copping avoided Bryant "at all costs" despite his attempts to befriend them.

=== Death of Helen Harvey ===
On 20 October 1992, Harvey, aged 59, was killed along with two of her dogs when her car veered onto the wrong side of the road and hit an oncoming car directly. Bryant was inside the vehicle at the time of the accident and was hospitalised for seven months with severe neck and back injuries. He returned to his family's home to convalesce after leaving hospital. Bryant was briefly investigated by police for the role he played in the accident, as he had a known habit of lunging for the steering wheel and Harvey had already had three accidents as a result but he was ultimately not criminally charged due to a lack of sufficient evidence. Harvey often told acquaintances that this was the reason she never drove faster than 60 kilometres an hour (37 mph). Harvey even allegedly said to a neighbour that "one of these days the little bastard [Bryant] is going to kill me." Bryant was named the sole beneficiary of Harvey's will and came into possession of assets totalling more than AU$550,000 (equivalent to about AU$1,318,515 in 2026 adjusted for inflation) which unexpectedly made Bryant a very wealthy man. As Bryant had only the "vaguest notions" of financial matters, his mother subsequently applied for and was granted a guardianship order, placing his assets under the management of public trustees. The order was based on evidence of Bryant's diminished intellectual capacity.

=== Death of Maurice Bryant ===
After Harvey's death, Bryant's father Maurice, aged 60, looked after the Copping farm. Maurice had been prescribed antidepressants and had discreetly transferred his joint bank account and utilities into his wife's name. Two months later, on 14 August 1993, a visitor looking for Maurice at the Copping property found a note saying "call the police" pinned to the door and found several thousand dollars in his car. Police searched the property for Maurice without success. Divers were called to search the four dams on the property, and on 16 August, Maurice's body was found in the dam closest to the farmhouse, with a diving weight belt around his neck. Police described the death as "unnatural" and it was ruled a suicide. Bryant inherited the proceeds of his father's superannuation fund, valued at AU$250,000 (equivalent to about AU$589,491 in 2026).

=== Loneliness and Traveling Days ===
Shortly after his father and Harvey’s death Bryant sold the Copping farm for AU$143,000 (equal to AU$337,189 in 2026) and kept the former Harvey mansion. While living at Copping, the white overalls he habitually wore were replaced with clothing more in line with Harvey's financial status. Now that he was alone, Bryant's fashion sense became more eccentric; he often wore a grey linen suit, cravat, lizard-skin shoes and a Panama hat while carrying a briefcase during the day, telling anyone who would listen that he had a high paying career as a businessman. Bryant often wore a flashy custom made electric blue business suit with flared trousers and a ruffled shirt to the restaurant he frequented. The restaurant owner recalled: "It was horrible. Everyone was laughing at him, even the customers. I really felt suddenly quite sorry for him. I realised this guy didn't really have any friends."

With both Harvey and his father dead, Bryant became increasingly lonely. From 1993 to late 1995, with generous amounts of money he inherited Bryant travelled overseas fourteen times and a summary of his domestic airline travel filled three pages. However, Bryant had felt as lonely travelling as he did at home in Tasmania. While Bryant hated the destinations he visited his favourite part of his journeys were the long flights, as he could endlessly speak to his fellow passengers sitting adjacent to him who had no choice but to be polite. He later took great joy in recalling and describing some of the conversations he had with fellow passengers. Bryant ultimately became suicidal after deciding he had "had enough," stating, "I just felt more people were against me. When I tried to be friendly toward them, they just walked away." Although he had previously been little more than a social drinker, Bryant's alcohol consumption rapidly increased and although he was sober on the day of the massacre, had especially escalated in the six months prior. His average daily consumption was estimated at half a bottle of Sambuca and a bottle of Baileys Irish Cream, supplemented with port wine and other sweet alcoholic drinks. According to Bryant, he thought the plan for the massacre might have first occurred to him four to twelve weeks before the event.

== Port Arthur massacre ==
Bryant has provided conflicting and confused accounts of what led him to kill thirty-five people at the Port Arthur Historic Site on 28 April 1996. It could have been his desire for attention, as he allegedly told a next-door neighbour, "I'll do something that will make everyone remember me." His defence psychiatrist, Paul Mullen, former chief of forensic psychiatry at Monash University, said Bryant became fascinated with the Dunblane massacre in Scotland: "He followed Dunblane. His planning started with Dunblane. Before that he was thinking about suicide, but Dunblane and the early portrayal of the killer, Thomas Hamilton, changed everything."

Bryant's first victims, David and Noelene Martin, owned a bed and breakfast guest house called "Seascape." The Martins had beaten Bryant's father in purchasing the bed and breakfast his father had made great efforts to secure financial support to purchase, and his father had complained to Bryant on numerous occasions of the damage done to their family because of that purchase. Bryant apparently believed the Martins bought the property out of spite towards his family and blamed them for causing the depression that led to his father's suicide and sought revenge. He fatally shot the Martins in the guest house and stole their weapons and the property keys before driving towards the Port Arthur site.

At Port Arthur, Bryant paid the entry fee for the site and parked his car. After parking, he entered the Broad Arrow Café on the grounds of the historic site, carrying a large blue sports bag filled with his collected arsenal of weapons. While he was eating, Bryant attempted to start conversations with random people about the lack of “WASPs” in the area and the lack of usual Japanese tourists. He took out a Colt AR-15 SP1 Carbine (semi-automatic rifle) from the sports bag and began firing from the hip, shooting patrons and staff in the cafe. Within fifteen seconds, he had fired seventeen shots, killing twelve people and wounding ten. Bryant then walked to the other side of the shop and fired twelve more times, killing another eight people while wounding two. He then changed magazines before fleeing, shooting at people in the car park and from his yellow Volvo 244 as he drove away; an additional four were killed and six were injured.

Bryant drove 300 metres down the road, to where a woman and her two children were walking. He stopped and fired two shots, killing the woman and the child she was carrying. The older child tried to flee the scene, but Bryant chased after her and killed her with a single shot. He then stole a 1980 gold BMW 7 series by killing all four of its occupants. A short distance down the road, he stopped beside a couple in a white Toyota and, drawing his weapon, ordered the male occupant into the boot of the BMW. After shutting the boot, he fired two shots into the windscreen of the Toyota, killing the female driver.

Bryant returned to the guest house, set the stolen car alight and took his hostage inside, where he had left the Martins' corpses. The police tried to negotiate with Bryant for many hours before the battery in the cordless phone he was using ran out, ending communication. Bryant's only demand was to be transported in an Australian Army helicopter to the nearest airport. During the negotiations, Bryant killed his hostage. The following morning, eighteen hours later, Bryant set fire to the guest house and attempted to escape in the confusion. Suffering burns to his back and buttocks, Bryant was captured and taken to the Royal Hobart Hospital, where he was treated and kept under heavy guard.

== Sentencing and Imprisonment ==
Bryant was judged fit to stand trial, which was scheduled to begin on 7 November 1996. He initially pleaded not guilty but was persuaded by his court-appointed lawyer, John Avery, to plead guilty to all charges in order to avoid a highly publicized trial that would have likely caused a lot of unprecedented grief. Two weeks later, on 22 November, Hobart Supreme Court Judge William Cox gave Bryant thirty-five life sentences, plus 1,652 years in prison, without the possibility of parole, all of which is to be served concurrently; this life sentence being applied is "for the term of [his] natural life."

For the first eight months of his imprisonment, Bryant was held in a purpose-built suicide-prevention cell in almost complete solitary confinement. He remained in protective custody for his own safety until 13 November 2006, when he was moved into Hobart's Wilfred Lopes Centre, a secure mental health unit run by the Tasmanian Department of Health and Human Services. The 35-bed unit for inmates with serious mental illness is staffed with doctors, nurses and other support workers. Inmates are not locked down and can come and go from their cells. Exterior security at the facility is provided by a three-wall perimeter patrolled by private contract guards.

On 5 July 2003, an incident occurred that led an inmate to spray a cleaning solution into Bryant's eyes, resulting in his transfer to Royal Hobart Hospital. On 25 March 2007, Bryant attempted to end his life by slashing his wrist with a razor blade. On 27 March, he cut his throat with another razor blade and was hospitalised briefly. Bryant is currently housed in the maximum-security Risdon Prison near Hobart. According to prison guards, Martin’s health and physical appearance has significantly deteriorated due to eating excessive amounts of food and refusing to exercise and he became morbidly obese, with his weight increasing to 160 kilograms (350 lb), earning him the derisive nickname “Porky Pig” from the guards.

=== Media coverage ===
Newspaper coverage immediately after the massacre raised serious questions about journalistic practices, and criticism was directed toward Australian media. Photographs of Bryant published in the newspaper The Australian had his eyes digitally manipulated with the effect of making him appear deranged and "glaring." Despite the criticism, the manipulated photographs continued to be used in media reporting a decade later. There were also questions as to whether the photos had been obtained from Bryant's house after it had been sealed by police.

Tasmania's director of public prosecutions warned media that the coverage compromised Bryant's right to a fair trial, and writs were issued against The Australian, the Hobart Mercury (which used Bryant's picture under the headline "This is the Man"), The Age and the ABC. The chairman of the Australian Press Council at the time, David Flint, argued that because newspapers regularly ignored contempt-of-court provisions, this showed that the law, not the newspapers, needed change. Flint suggested that such a change in the law would not necessarily lead to trial by media. Australian newspapers also came under critical scrutiny of their accounts of Bryant and how the kind of identity responsible for his and other similar kinds of killing might be understood.

=== Political aftermath ===
As a response to the massacre, Australian state and territory governments introduced extensive restrictions on all firearms, including semi-automatic centre-fire rifles, repeating shotguns (holding more than five shots) and high-capacity rifle magazines. In addition, limitations were imposed on low-capacity repeating shotguns and rim-fire semi-automatic rifles. Though the measures caused controversy, opposition to the new laws was lessened by media reporting of the massacre and mounting public opinion.

== In popular culture ==
In March 2012, Sydney artist Rodney Pople controversially won the AU$35,000 Glover Prize for his landscape painting depicting Port Arthur with Bryant in the foreground holding a firearm. In 2019, the massacre was referenced in the lyrics of Pond's song, "The Boys Are Killing Me", featured on their album Tasmania. The 2021 film Nitram, directed by Justin Kurzel, is based on Bryant's life, with Caleb Landry Jones in the role of Bryant. Jones won the Cannes Film Festival Award for Best Actor for his portrayal.

== See also ==
- List of rampage killers in Oceania and Maritime Southeast Asia
- The Alannah and Madeline Foundation
- List of longest prison sentences
