= Graham Fransella =

Australian figurative and abstract painter

- Born: 1950 (age 75–76); Harrow, England
- Education: Bradford School of Art, Yorkshire
- Known for: Painting, Sculpture, Printmaking
- Awards: 2009 Wynne Trustees Watercolour Prize, Art Gallery of New South Wales, Australia 2007 Wynne Trustees Watercolour Prize, Art Gallery of New South Wales, Australia 2006 Wynne Trustees Watercolour Prize, Art Gallery of New South Wales, Australia 2000 Wynne Trustees Watercolour Prize, Art Gallery of New South Wales, Australia

Graham Fransella (born 3 June 1950) is an Australian figurative and abstract painter.

== Life ==
Fransella was born in Harrow, England. He studied at the Bradford School of Art, Yorkshire in the early 1970s, before moving to Melbourne, Australia, in 1975.

== Work ==
Fransella is known for his abstract figurative paintings and prints. His basic iconography of heads and figures has remained constant throughout his work. His work is represented in private and public collections including the National Gallery of Australia, National Gallery of Victoria, Art Gallery of New South Wales, Queensland Art Gallery, Parliament House, Canberra, the Print Council of Australia and Saatchi and Saatchi, London.

Fransella has been an Archibald Prize finalist, Dobell Prize and Sulman Drawing Prize finalist and has won the Art Gallery of New South Wales Wynne Trustees Watercolour Prize in 2000, 2006, 2007 and 2009. He was also the subject of an Archibald Prize 2006 finalists entry by Geoffrey Dyer entitled 'The Abstractionist Graham Fransella'.

== See also ==
- Art of Australia
- Archibald Prize 2006 finalists
- List of Australian artists
