= List of Archibald Prize 2013 finalists =

This is a list of finalists for the 2013 Archibald Prize for portraiture. As the images are copyrighted, an external link to an image has been listed where available (listed is Artist – Title).

- Abdul Abdullah – The man (Portrait of Anthony Mundine) (Image)
- Giles Alexander – Simulations (Portrait of Lily Serna) (Image)
- Del Kathryn Barton – hugo (Portrait of Hugo Weaving) (Winner of the 2013 Archibald Prize) (Image)
- Jason Benjamin – Fight Club (Portrait of McLean Edwards) (Image)
- Natasha Bieniek – Application (Self-portrait) (Image)
- Mitch Cairns – Self-portrait (Image)
- Marcus Callum – Portrait of the artist as a young man (Portrait of his son Sebastian) (Image)
- Julia Ciccarone – Portrait of Nicholas Jones (Image)
- Peter Daverington – The patriot: self-portrait with Albino Joey (Image)
- Julie Dowling – Wilfred Hicks (Image)
- McLean Edwards – Glenn Barkley, curator (Image)
- John Emmerig – Gageler (Image)
- Vincent Fantauzzo – Love face (Portrait of Asher Keddie) (Winner of the 2013 People's Choice Award) (Image)
- Prudence Flint – Ukulele (Portrait of Athena Bellas) (Image)
- Warwick Gilbert – Don Walker (Image)
- Mertim Gokalp – Derwish: a portrait of Bille Brown (Image)
- David Griggs – TV Moore (Image)
- Sarah Hendy – Jasper Knight (Image)
- Paul Jackson – Jo (Portrait of Joanna Braithwaite) (Image)
- Alan Jones – Corro (Portrait of Pat Corrigan) (Image)
- Jasper Knight – Adam Cullen: the light is a drip on a dark hood (Image)
- Michael Lindeman – Dear Trustees (self-portrait) (Image)
- Fiona Lowry – Shaun Gladwell (Image)
- Mathew Lynn – Tara Moss (Winner of the 2013 Packing Room Prize) (Image)
- Amanda Marburg – Ken Done (Image)
- Abbey McCulloch – Naomi Watts (Image)
- Alexander McKenzie – Toni Collette (Image)
- Joshua McPherson – Portrait of Ella (Ella Nicol) (Image)
- Guy Morgan – Guy Morgan with Peter Pan after retinal detachment (Image)
- Carlo Pagoda – Habit de jardinier (Portrait of Pietro Pagoda) (Image)
- James Powditch – Ben Quilty, where is my mind? (after the Pixies) (Image)
- Sally Ryan – Dr Catherine Hamlin AC (MBBS, FRCS, FRANZCOG, FRCOG) (Image)
- Wendy Sharpe – Anything goes (Venus vamp – burlesque star) (Image)
- Imants Tillers – The emergency of being (Self-portrait) (Image)
- Michael Vale – Warren Ellis (Image)
- Xu Wang – Self-portrait (interviewing Maoist victims) (Image)
- Heidi Yardley – Self-portrait: harlequin (Image)
- Joshua Yeldham – Self-portrait: Morning Bay (Image)
- Michael Zavros – Bad dad (Self-portrait) (Image)

== See also ==
- Previous year: List of Archibald Prize 2012 finalists
- Next year: List of Archibald Prize 2014 finalists
- List of Archibald Prize winners
