= Jasper Knight =

Australian artist (born 1978)

Jasper Knight (born 25 December 1978) is an Australian artist. He is the brother of writer and presenter Dominic Knight, and grandson of Sir H. M. Knight.

Knight has been a finalist eight times in the Archibald Prize from 2005, 2006, 2007, 2009, 2010, 2013, 2019 and 2022, with portraits were of Richard Gill, Bob Carr, his grandfather Sir Harold Knight, Bill Wright AM, Jason Phu, Adam Cullen and Abdul Abdullah respectively, aside from himself. He has been a finalist in the 2005, 2006, 2011 and 2012 Wynne Prize for landscape painting, and the 2013 and 2015 Sir John Sulman Prize. He won the Mosman Art Prize in 2008.

In 2012, Knight was a finalist for the first time in the Doug Moran National Portrait Prize with a portrait of Australian painter Jeffrey Smart and in 2014 with a portrait of David Griggs. He has been an Archibald Prize subject twice in 2009 and 2013. A portrait of him by Sarah Hendy was a finalist in the 2013 Archibald Prize. In 2021, Knight's portrait of artist Reko Rennie was accepted into the permanent collection of the National Portrait Gallery. Knight is also in the National Gallery of Australia collection along with most major regional galleries.

Knight is the co-director of Chalk Horse gallery in Darlinghurst

His first major monograph is due out at the end of the year published by Thames & Hudson and a second publication titled 'Fifty Portraits' is due out in 2022 published by Artist Profile magazine.
