= Cherry Hood =

Australian artist (born 1950)

- Born: 11 September 1950 (age 75); Sydney, Australia
- Education: Sydney College of the Arts
- Awards: Archibald Prize; 2002; Kedumba Drawing Award; 2003
- Website: cherryhood.com.au

Cherry Hood is an Australian artist, best known for her oversized paintings of children's faces.

== Biography ==
Cherry Alexandra Hood was born in Sydney in 1950, and is the great granddaughter of Australian photographer, Sam Hood. She attained a Master of Visual Art at Sydney College of the Arts, University of Sydney in 2000. Her thesis investigated gender politics in art and culture, cultural mores and taboos surrounding the representation of the male body. Hood had countless solo and group shows while at university in artist-run spaces and is now represented and shows regularly At Tim Olsen Gallery in Sydney, Heiser Gallery in Brisbane, Arc One Gallery in Melbourne. Her works have been collected by most major institutions in Australia and many corporate and private collections. Hood has had solo shows in New York, Zurich, Los Angeles, San Francisco, Toronto and Vancouver.

Hood prefers to work in watercolour, which she allows to bleed and drip, to produce her oversized paintings. Hood specialises in intense depictions which are most frequently anonymous composites with their own identities and not portraits of any actual person. She has become well known for her haunting, large-scale images of young boy's faces.

Hood won the 2002 Archibald Prize for her portrait Simon Tedeschi Unplugged. In 2001 she was an Archibald Prize finalist with her water colour of art lecturer Matthÿs Gerber, in 2007 she was again a finalist with her water colour of Australian artist and social commentator Ben Quilty, and in 2010 with her portrait of Michael Zavros. In 2003 Hood won the Kedumba Drawing Award for her graphite, coloured pencil, watercolour drawing named Joshua.

== 2002 Archibald Prize win ==
It was a photograph picture of Australian pianist Simon Tedeschi that first caught Cherry Hood's eye. She went to one of his concerts, at the Art Gallery of New South Wales, and then asked him to sit for her. "Although I don't normally do portrait/likenesses of people, I usually paint boys or adolescent males," she says. "Simon is only 20 and he has large pale blue eyes which you can almost see through, his look suits the way I make images. The eyes are always the focus of my paintings. I want them to reflect the gaze of the viewer and I am interested in the way his pale eyes both reflect light and have a differentiation between the pupil and iris. I met him and found he is particularly empathetic, easy going and very sensitive artistically. He saw my work and he understood what I was doing."

Hood decided to paint him topless because, she says, "he is always portrayed in formal clothes and often with a piano as well. Images of him are usually more about his playing than about him as a person let alone him as a sensual body. Also, at that time I was finishing a series of huge portraits of boys for my next exhibition. Simon saw these works and agreed to pose for me in the same way.

It was quite easy to portray him because he has strong characteristics. I think it does look like him, if not at his most rested. He keeps up a rigorous international performance schedule and lives between Sydney and London. He was suffering jet lag or in 'post concert letdown' when he sat for this painting. When he last saw the work he said, 'love the whiskers, remind me to stop over in Bangkok next time.'

She received a prize of $35,000 Australian dollars.

== Illustrations ==
Cherry Hood illustrated JT LeRoy's 2004 novel Harold's End with a series of her distinctive portraits as well as pictures of Harold, the pet snail whose name gives the book its title. In the Acknowledgements LeRoy wrote, "This is the first of what I hope will be a very long collaboration between us. Our next book is titled Labor."

Awards and achievements
Preceded by Nicholas Harding	Archibald Prize; 2002 for Simon Tedeschi Unplugged	Succeeded by Geoffrey Dyer
