= Jan Williamson =

Australian artist

- Known for: Painting

Jan Williamson is an Australian artist. She is a mother of nine children. She is known for winning the Archibald Prize Packing Room Prize twice in a row: in 2002 with a portrait of Jenny Morris—which also won the People's Choice Award—and again in 2003 with a portrait of actor Rachel Ward.

She was a finalist in the 2009 Archibald Prize.

Awards
Preceded by Paul Newton	People's Choice Award; 2002 portrait of singer/songwriter Jenny Morris	Succeeded by Dalu Zhao
