= Alice Lang =

Australian contemporary artist

Alice Lang (born 18 March 1983) is an Australian contemporary artist. She works and lives in Los Angeles, CA. Lang has mounted many solo exhibitions of her work, and participated extensively in group exhibitions. She has held residencies in Canada, New York, and Los Angeles.

Lang's work is often feminist in nature, utilising mixed media. Lang often creates sculptural forms involving the female body that are surreal and organic in appearance.

== Early life and education ==
Lang grew up in Byron Bay, New South Wales. In 2004 she gained a Bachelor of Fine Arts with First Class Honours from Queensland University of Technology, Brisbane, QLD, Australia, specializing in visual arts. Lang graduated with an MFA from CalArts in 2015.

== Career ==
Lang's work was included in the Institute of Modern Art's 2004 Brisbane exhibition of recent art school graduates.

In 2007 her art was included in the "Topsy" exhibition at the Metro Arts Gallery. Her "soft sculptures" were part of the 2008 show Together Forever at the Broadway Gallery in New York.

In 2010, Lang co-founded LEVEL, an artist-run initiative and feminist collective in Brisbane Australia with artists Courtney Coombs, and Rachel Haynes.

In 2013, Lang was a finalist for the churchie national emerging art prize. Her work Boxcopy Slide Night was on exhibit at the Metro Arts Gallery.

In 2016 Lang's work was included in an exhibition at the Melbourne International Comedy Festival. She also contributed works to the Fragmented Gaze exhibit at the Los Angeles Tiger Strikes Asteroid Gallery.

== Grants and awards ==
Lang has been the recipient of many grants and awards including the Queensland Art Gallery Melville Haysom Scholarship (2009), the Australia Council Emerging Artist New Work Grant (2012), the Lord Mayor's Young and Emerging Artist Fellowship (2012) and the Freedman Foundation Traveling Scholarship for Emerging Artists (2013).

== Exhibitions ==
=== Selected solo exhibitions ===
- 2021 Cool story bro, Louise Alexander Gallery/AF Projects, Los Angeles, CA, USA
- 2016 BLOWBACK, Karen Woodbury Gallery, Melbourne, AUS
- 2015 AIRHEADS, CalArts, Los Angeles, CA, USA
- 2013 Womp Womp Womp Womp, CalArts, Los Angeles, CA, USA
- 2013 OM NOM NOM NOM, Boxcopy, Brisbane, QLD, AUS
- 2013 Forget I Said Anything, RAID Projects studio space, Los Angeles, CA, USA
- 2012 Teetering at the Edge of Rock Bottom, InFlight ARI, Hobart, TAS, AUS
- 2011 Multiple Visions, Grantpirrie window space, Redfern, Sydney, NSW, AUS
- 2010 Just in Case, Museum of Brisbane, Brisbane, QLD, AUS
- 2010 Crossing Over, Firstdraft, Surrey Hills, Sydney, NSW, AUS

=== Selected group exhibitions ===
- 2017 Let's Talk About Art, Artbank, Sydney, NSW, AUS
- 2017 Close Enough, Caloundra Regional Gallery, Caloundra, QLD, AUS
- 2016 Domestic Observations, JACE Space, Los Angeles, CA, USA
- 2016 The Wicked Tongue, Charlie James Gallery, Los Angeles, CA, USA
- 2016 Unfolding/Folding, KINGS, Melbourne, AUS
- 2016 Spring 1883, Karen Woodbury Gallery, Melbourne, AUS
- 2016 2017, Art Centre, Pasadena, CA, USA
- 2016 Is This Thing On?, Counihan Gallery in Brunswick, Melbourne, AUS
