= Jason Benjamin =

Australian painter (1971–2021)

- Born: 1971; Melbourne, Victoria, Australia
- Died: 16 February 2021 (aged 49); Carrathool, New South Wales, Australia
- Education: Pratt Institute
- Known for: Painting
- Awards: Archibald Packing Room Prize; 2005 Staring down the past Mosman Art Prize; 1993, 1994 and 1996

Jason Benjamin (1971 – 16 February 2021) was an Australian painter.

== Biography ==
Benjamin was born in Melbourne in 1971. In his youth he lived in the United States and Mexico. After brief periods of study at The Stony Brook School on Long Island and the Pratt Institute in New York City, he returned to Australia in the early 1990s.

He began exhibiting his artwork 1989 and won the 2005 Packing Room Prize at the Archibald Prize with a painting of actor Bill Hunter titled Staring down the past. He won the 1993, 1994 and 1996 Mosman Art Prizes in Sydney. In 1997 he was awarded the Kings School Art Prize for landscape painting. He was a finalist in the Archibald Prize in 2011, 2013, 2014 and 2015.

Benjamin was found dead in the Murrumbidgee River near Carrathool, New South Wales on 16 February 2021, aged 50.
