= Peter Churcher =

Australian artist

Peter Churcher (born 1964) is an Australian artist. He paints portraits and figures in a realistic style.

== Life and work ==
Peter Churcher was born in Brisbane, Queensland. He is the son of Betty Churcher, who was the director of the National Gallery of Australia from 1990-1997. Churcher is currently living and working in Barcelona, Spain. Churcher has two children, Saul and Charlotte who live with Peter and his wife Andrea in Spain.

He holds a Bachelor of Music (Hons) from Melbourne University that he acquired in 1986, he also holds a Bachelor of Fine Arts in Painting from Prahran School of Art and Design, that he acquired in 1991. His first solo exhibition was in 1994. He was selected by the Australian War Memorial to be the official Australian war artist for the war on terrorism in 2002 where he was sent to the Persian Gulf and Diego Garcia, he recorded the people and operations of the Royal Australian Navy (RAN) and Royal Australian Air Force (RAAF).

Bruce, Linde and me on the road to Guadelupe by Peter Churcher, finalist Archibald Portrait Prize, 2006

He has entered at ten Archibald prizes and been hung six times. He was represented in the 1996, 1997 and 1999 Archibald Prizes, as well as the 1998 and 2000 Sulman Prize.

He was interviewed in the 2005 Peter Berner documentary about the Archibald Prize called Loaded Brush. Churcher was also awarded first prize in "El Concurso de Grabados" (Printmaking Prize) de Sant Lluc, Barcelona, 2008. He was an Archibald Prize finalist in 2005 with his Portrait of Jeffrey Smart, in 2006 with his painting Bruce, Linde and me on the road to Guadelupe, in 2014 and 2015.

== Artist statement ==
"Since graduating from art school, I have been primarily concerned with the painting of the human figure in a narrative context and the depiction of the human presence - that is the Portrait. This focus all stems from my devotion to the great figurative masters such as Velasquez and Rembrandt and my firm belief and personal quest to depict our own surrounding world of visual, sensory and emotional stimuli through paint on canvas."

== Collections ==
- National Gallery of Australia, Canberra, ACT
- National Portrait Gallery Canberra, ACT
- Parliament House, Melbourne, VIC
- University Art Museum, University of Queensland, Brisbane, QLD
- Mornington Peninsula Regional Gallery, VIC
- Collection of Kerry Stokes, WA
- Collection of William S Lieberman, USA
- Shell Australia, Melbourne, VIC
- Collection of Margaret Olley, NSW
- Temple Beth Israel, Melbourne, VIC
