= Anthony Bennett (artist) =

Australian artist (born 1966)

Anthony Bennett (born in 1966 in Mackay, Queensland) is an Australian artist . He has lived and worked in Tokyo, Rome and London and has exhibited nationally in Australia and internationally. He was a finalist in the Archibald Prize in 2009 for the second year running and was also a finalist in both the Wynne and Sulman Prizes for 2009. In 2007 he was featured as one of the 'hot young queensland painters' interviewed on ABC TV's Sunday Arts programme and that year also won the renault new generation art award at Art Sydney. He has also been a finalist in the prestigious Conrad Jupiters Art Prize, Sculpture by the Sea, The Schubert Ulrick Photographic Awards and the Cromwell's Art Prize. In 2004 he was awarded a Bundanon residency. Graduating from Griffith University Queensland College of Art with a Bachelor of Visual Art and majors in painting and sculpture in 1999.

Described in Art & Australia in 2006 as, a "potent anti-corporate poet" by reviewer Vikki Riley, his work uses the language and imagery of the everyday, appropriating pop culture with grabs from advertising, cartoons, music and movie stars and references respectful and otherwise to art history. He refers as much to Kierkegaard and Camus as Kath and Kim. His imagery quotes from Willem de Kooning, Andy Warhol, Brett Whiteley, Jean-Michel Basquiat and Cy Twombly. His titles are integral components and often mash words into the perceptive equation to play off the imagery, adding to the semantic game and augmenting the mood of dissent, while also revealing much about his practice. His work is contained in many private collections in Australia, New Zealand, Austria, China, Japan, Italy and England.Artist's folio site

== Description of his influences ==
Bennett paints every day. Pop culture becomes the words that he uses to construct his artistic sentences. "If the viewer is aware of Freud or Jung then a discussion of the ideas those heavyweight thinkers have provided us is in play. If the viewer is only aware of the last Hollywood version of 'Superman', but not Nietzsche's version then that might be just as relevant to them, but not necessarily the end of the story...." says Bennett.

"I don't really like conversations about art," he continues "because I think art is a visual language in and of itself and when you learn that language properly, why talk over the top of it."

"Pop Cannibal is the term I use for it. The Tarantino or Simpsons style mix and match of genres in equal parts homage and/or critique. Not always equal parts either, as nothing should be written in stone. It depends on mood, day of the week, the quality of the wine consumed etc."

== Death of his mother and brother ==
The death of Bennett's mother and brother in a car accident made him introspective and pushed him to explore the philosophers of the past. He began to travel, heading to England for the first time.

Much of the work produced in that period he destroyed because he felt it was made more as a cathartic experience rather than something to be shown or used to derive income from.

== Stunt in Vatican City ==
In 1999, while living in Rome, Bennett carried out his first commando card installation. He placed over 120 postcards of nudes that he had produced in Australia, into the postcard racks of the Vatican Gift Shop. Aware of the strict security and the ever present Swiss Guard he pretended to be perusing the stacks and would take out one of the pope postcards for sale, look at it and then when he returned it to the stack, he would palm one of his own cards in behind it. One at a time until all were in place. He reasoned that once the outer cards were purchased by those on pilgrimage, his cards would be revealed in each slot, but not be purchased given the subject matter, and the postcard racks would slowly bloom into a postcard rack sculpture of his work, aided unwittingly by the compliance of the faithful Catholics.

== Cho Sagoi Desu Ne ==
In 2000 Bennett spent 2 years in Tokyo. He started photographing the people in the streets and the fashions and styles of youth culture that he saw there. The photographic exhibition 'tokyo lipstick' was the result, shown in Brisbane in 2002.

== Super Thanks for Asking ==
super thanks for asking is the title of an exhibition in 2007 that continues with the use of portraits and in particular "celebrity" that started some years ago, in which Bennett paints iconic figures in garish hues and against a single colour backdrop, with sardonic commentary scrawled in tiny text. Subjects include Andy Warhol, Brett Whiteley, Vincent van Gogh, Queen Elizabeth II, Salvador Dalí, Henri Matisse, Reg Mombasa and Peter Garrett.
