= Stewart MacFarlane =

Australian painter

- Born: Stewart Angus MacFarlane; November 1953 (age 72); Adelaide, South Australia
- Education: Victorian College of the Arts, South Australian School of Arts, School of Visual Arts in New York City, Skowhegan School of Painting and Sculpture
- Known for: Painting, Printmaking,
- Movement: Realism

Homefront, Oil on canvas, 2010

Stewart Angus MacFarlane (born November 1953, Adelaide, South Australia), is an Australian figurative painter. His style is a pared-down realism (with expressionistic touches) combined with a surreality of lighting and perspective. He often, though not always, places a female or male nude in a situation of erotic enigma. He paints the Australian scene representative of Western society as a whole.

== Career ==
When aged 16 he enrolled at the South Australian School of Art, where he was influenced by the Adelaide painters, David Dridan and David Dallwitz. He gained a Diploma of Fine Arts (Painting) in 1974. The next year he travelled to America where he had group and solo exhibitions, as well as pursuing his other love, music. In 1977 he graduated with a Bachelor in Fine Arts (Painting) from the School of Visual Arts, New York City. He was a studio assistant of Alex Katz, Chuck Close, and Janet Fish. Since returning to Australia in 1983, MacFarlane has earned his living as a professional painter, exhibiting several times a year, either in Australia or internationally.

MacFarlane is also a musician. His band, "Stew Lane and The Untouchables", performed and recorded in New York City from 1979 to 1981. The Album, Harder Than Wax was released by AZ International, France, in 1980. The band's independent release, "U.N.Rap Song" (Private Ear Records, 1980) was acknowledged by Freddy Fresh as one of the earliest rap records and one of the first examples of a group, outside the hip-hop genre, to incorporate rap into their music.

== Bibliography ==
Monographs

- Helmridge-Marsillian, Veronique, Stewart MacFarlane. Riddles of Life, Craftsman House, Sydney, 1996
- Jose, Nicholas & Morrell, Timothy, "Stewart MacFarlane, Paintings", Wei-Ling Gallery, Kuala Lumpur, 2012

Books

- Aland, Jenny, Australian Artlook, Heinemann, Melbourne, 1997
- Drury, Nevill, Images 2, Contemporary Australian Painting, Craftsman House, Sydney, 1994
- Drury, Nevill, Images 3, Contemporary Australian Painting, Craftsman House, Sydney, 1998
- McCulloch, Alan, (rev. by Susan McCulloch), The Encyclopedia of Australian Art, Allen and Unwin, Sydney, 1994
- McCulloch, Alan, McCulloch, Susan, and McCulloch, Emily, The New McCulloch's Encyclopedia of Australian Art, Miegunyah Press, Melbourne, 2006
- Pickett, Charles, Cars and Culture. Our Driving Passions, HarperCollins and Powerhouse Publishing, Sydney, 1999
- Williams, Donald, and Simpson, Colin, Art Now. Contemporary Art Post-1970, McGraw-Hill, Sydney, 1994

Articles

- Adam, Rosemary, "Stewart MacFarlane: 'Roswell'", Art Monthly, September 1990
- Adam, Rosemary, "Stewart MacFarlane", Tension, March 1992
- Heathcote, Christopher, "Summer Famine", Art Monthly, March 1989
- Helmridge-Marsillian, Veronique, "Work and Sex. Three Paintings by Stewart MacFarlane", Art Monthly, July 1994
- Morrell, Timothy, "The Function", Artlines, Queensland Art Gallery Society, August–September 1997

Catalogues

- Katz, Vincent, Compulsion: Stewart MacFarlane, Brisbane City Gallery, 2001
- Leong, Roger, The Painted Self. Rick Amor, Peter Churcher, Kevin Lincoln, Stewart MacFarlane and Lewis Miller, Mornington Peninsula Regional Gallery, 2006
- MacFarlane, Stewart, Door of Memories, Roswell Museum and Art Center, New Mexico, USA, 1987
- MacFarlane, Stewart, Screenplay, Galerie Carlos Hulsch Berlin, Germany, 2000
- MacFarlane, Stewart, and Helmridge-Marsillian, Veronique, Stewart MacFarlane. Small Observations. A Survey of Small Oil Paintings 1967–2005, Carnegie Gallery, Hobart, 2006
- Rufe, Laurie, and Fleming, Stephen, Beyond a Gift of Time. Current Work by Former Fellows of the Roswell Artist-in-Residence Program, Roswell Museum and Art Center, New Mexico, USA, 2008
- Smith, Jason, So You Wanna Be a Rock 'n' Roll Star, NGV Shell Collection, 2005
- Wei-Ling, Lim, Private Life. Stewart MacFarlane, Wei-Ling Gallery, Kuala Lumpur, Malaysia, 2006

Video

- Nedelkopolous, Nicholas. Private View (2004, 49 mins, Mini Digital Video) Documentary on artist Stewart MacFarlane.
