= Shen Jiawei =

Chinese Australian painter (born 1948)

- 沈嘉蔚; (Pinyin: Shĕn Jiā wèi)
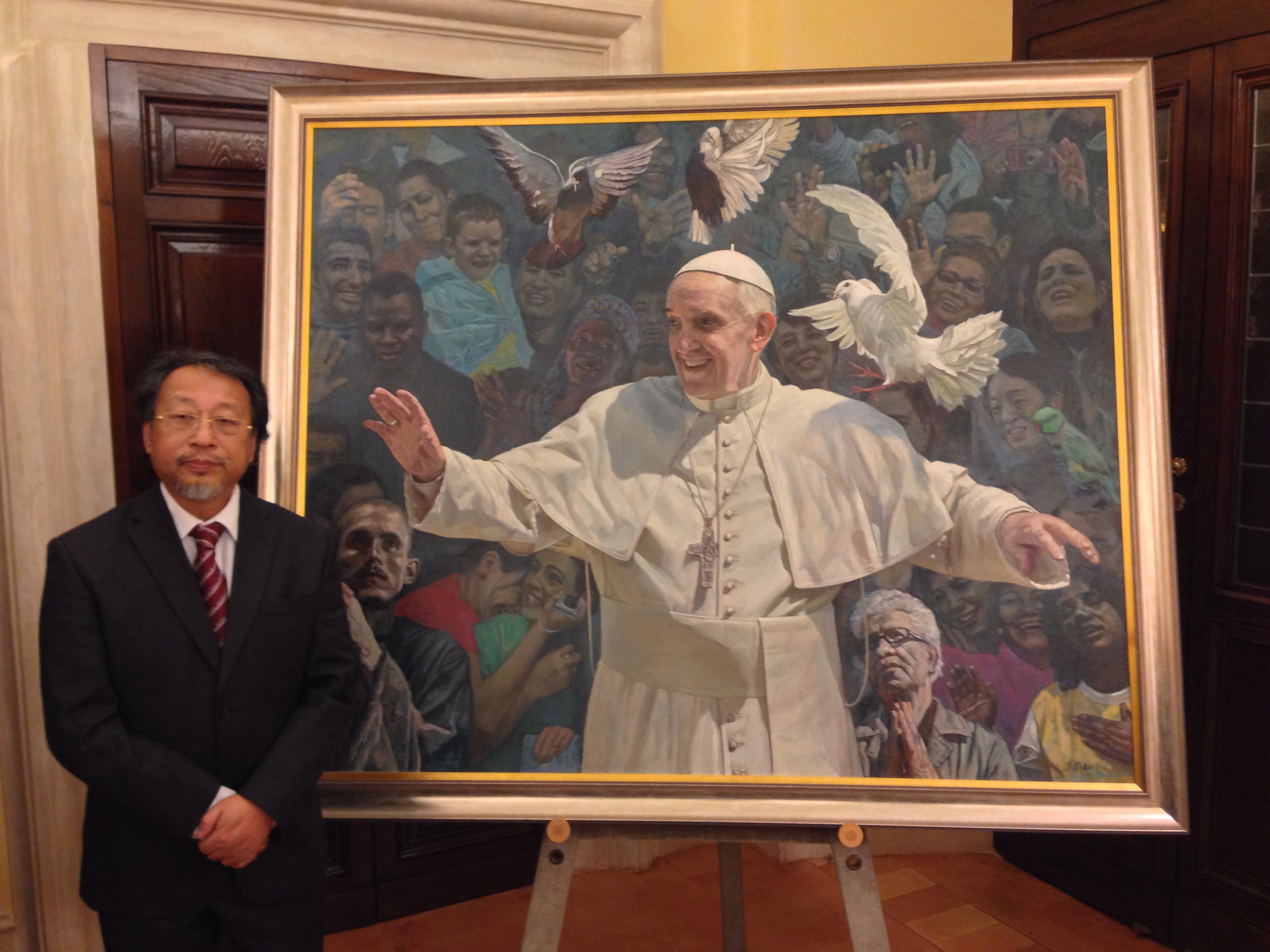
- Shen Jiawei, Portrait of Pope Francis presented to the pope on 28 April 2014
- Born: September 16, 1948 (age 78); Shanghai, China
- Known for: Painting
- Notable work: Standing Guard for Our Great Motherland (1974); At the Turn of the Century (1998); Portrait of Crown Princess Mary of Denmark (2005); The Tower of Babel (2017 to 2024)
- Spouse: Lan Wang
- Awards: Sir John Sulman Prize (2006)

Shen Jiawei (born 1948) is a Chinese-Australian painter. He is a winner of the 2006 Sir John Sulman Prize.

== Life and work ==
Shen Jiawei was born in Shanghai. He was in his final year of high school when the Cultural Revolution was launched in 1967. With the country's art universities closed, Jiawei instead chose to join the Red Guards and, later, the People’s Liberation Army. While in the PLA, he became a propaganda artist. He painted his best known work from this period, "Standing Guard for Our Great Motherland", while serving in Heilongjiang province in 1974. The piece was exhibited at the National Art Museum in Beijing later that year, where it received praise from Jiang Qing, the wife of Mao Zedong, and was subsequently shown in the Guggenheim Museum, both in New York City and Bilbao, in the China: 5000 Years exhibition, 1998. The piece was later altered by other government artists without Jiawei's permission, in order for the soldier's faces "to adhere to the regime’s standards for revolutionary art". This altered piece was reproduced as propaganda posters, and Jiawei became "one of the best-known artists in China" during the 1970s and 1980s as a result. In 1982, Jiawei was a member of the first class at the Central Academy of Fine Arts in Beijing since the Cultural Revolution.

In the 1980s, Shen made several history paintings, including Red Star over China (1987), which portrayed figures associated with the Long March, and Tolerance (1988), which depicted thinkers from the early Chinese Nationalist movement. Because Shen chose to include individuals in his paintings who had been removed from official accounts, he faced some pushback from authorities. Jiawei emigrated to Australia in 1989, where, he worked in Darling Harbour, Sydney as a portrait artist. In 1995, Shen won the Mary MacKillop Art Award and received a medal from Pope John Paul II. Since the 1990s, Jiawei has competed a number of pieces for the Catholic Church.

Shen is also a painter of large-scale history pictures represented in major public collections; including the National Art Gallery of China and the National Museum of China in Beijing. His more playful works examine political and cross-cultural issues through appropriation. "Absolute Truth" (2000) shows Mikhail Gorbachev and the Pope conversing in the Sistine Chapel and in "Wise Men from the East" (2002) the Magi in Leonardo da Vinci's unfinished Adoration of the Magi are Chinese sages. Other pieces includeThe Third World (2002), which depicts 92 important non-Western figures from the 20th century (including Mao, Mother Teresa, Osama bin Laden, Pol Pot, Imelda Marcos and Che Guevara), and Merdeka (2007), a "14-metre-long panorama of Malaysian history" containing 261 figures.

Recent portraits include former Melbourne Lord Mayor John So in a possum skin cloak (2003), Tom Hughes AO QC, the portrait of Crown Princess Mary of Denmark (2005) which hangs in the National Portrait Gallery, Canberra and the portrait of John Howard, former Prime Minister of Australia, which hangs in the Members' Hall of the Australian Parliament House as part of the Historic Memorials Collection. He painted the first official portrait of Pope Francis. In 2019, Shen Jiawei painted a portrait of philanthropist, Susan Wakil, AO, wearing an outfit by her favourite designer, Yves Saint Laurent, from a photograph, commissioned by Isaac Wakil, her husband of 62 years. The portrait was gifted to the National Art Gallery by Isaac Wakil in 2019.

=== The Tower of Babel and feature documentary ===
Between 2017 and 2024, Shen dedicated his artistic practice to creating a monumental four-panel (polyptych) work titled The Tower of Babel inside his purpose-built, three-storey studio in Bundeena, New South Wales.

The seven-year process of creating the artwork formed the focus of the 2024 feature documentary Welcome to Babel, directed by James Bradley. Measuring 130 square metres and standing 7.5 metres high, the artwork is a critique of twentieth-century communist ideology. In her review, Madeleine Swain of ScreenHub described the artwork as an "immense and truly breathtaking project". She also acknowledged the film "does a good job of succinctly explaining China’s recent history on the macro scale", as well as how it impacted Shen and his wife, fellow artist Lan Wang.

The documentary premiered at the 71st Sydney Film Festival in June 2024, where it won the Documentary Australia Award. The documentary also streamed on SBS On Demand.

As of 2026, Shen opens his studio to visitors on the Bundeena Maianbar Art Trail each month.

=== Family ===
Shen's wife, Lan Wang, is also a painter and sculptor. Their daughter, Xini, was born in 1989 at the start of the Tiananmen Square protests.

== Awards and recognition ==
Shen and some of his work featured in the 2001 Australian documentary "Yum Cha Cha", directed by Boyd Britton.

He won the 2006 Sir John Sulman Prize and the 2016 Gallipoli Art Prize with his piece Yeah, Mate! He was an Archibald Prize finalist in 1993, 1994, 1995, 1996, 1997, 1998, 1999, 2002, 2004, 2005, 2006, 2011, 2012 and 2015.

Shen Jiawei's art "Yalda Our Girl" was selected for 8th Beijing International Art Biennale China 2019.
