= Del Kathryn Barton =

Australian artist (born 1972)

- Born: 11 December 1972 (age 53); Sydney, Australia
- Awards: Archibald Prize; 2008 You are what is most beautiful about me, a self portrait with Kell and Arella Archibald Prize; 2013 hugo

Del Kathryn Barton (born 11 December 1972) is an Australian artist who began drawing at a young age, and studied at UNSW Art & Design (formerly the College of Fine Arts) at the University of New South Wales. She soon became known for her psychedelic fantasy works which she has shown in solo and group exhibitions across Australia and overseas. In 2008 and 2013 she won the Archibald Prizes for portraiture presented by the Art Gallery of New South Wales. In 2015 her animated film Oscar Wilde’s The Nightingale and the Rose won the Film Victoria Erwin Rado Award for Best Australian Short Film.

== Early life ==
Barton grew up in the bush-land of the lower Blue Mountains west of Sydney Australia, often living in sheds or tents with her hippie-like parents. Barton suffered depression as a child, and art became her therapy. She drew obsessively from an early age and lived in her imagination.

Her early subjects included fairies, animals, nature, and maps. She also drew the female form, occasionally using her mother to pose for her nude works, other times copying work from published magazines.

In 1990, she entered into the College of Fine Arts of the University of New South Wales, as an already accomplished artist with a wide repertoire of subjects. Her tutor during this time, whom she recalled as a “fantastic teacher”, was Michael Esson. After graduating with a Bachelor of Fine Arts in 1993 the artist was employed as a lecturer at CoFA from 1994-96.

== Career ==
She held her first exhibition in 1995, and has gone on to hold numerous solo exhibitions in Sydney and Melbourne.

Her solo exhibitions include: The Nightingale and the Rose, Australian Centre for the Moving Image (ACMI), Melbourne, Australia (2016); the highway is a disco, ARNDT, Singapore (2015); Electro Orchid, Roslyn Oxley9 Gallery, Sydney (2014); The Nightingale and the Rose, Heide Museum of Modern Art (2012); the stars eat your body, Kaliman Gallery, Sydney (2009); the whole of everything, Karen Woodbury Gallery, Melbourne (2008) and thank you for loving me, Karen Woodbury Gallery, Melbourne (2005).

On 7 March 2008, it was announced that Barton had won the 2008 Archibald Prize for portraiture, for You are what is most beautiful about me, a self portrait with Kell and Arella, a self-portrait with her two children. Barton said of the portrait: "This painting celebrates the love I have for my two children and how my relationship with them has radically informed and indeed transformed my understanding of who I am". A key inspiration for Barton is her experience of motherhood. In 2013, she won the Archibald Prize for her portrait of actor Hugo Weaving. Of portraiture generally, she says: "I really value the discipline" that it brings.

She was also an Archibald Prize finalist in 2008, 2013 and 2018.

She is represented by Roslyn Oxley9 Gallery in Sydney.

Barton participated in group exhibitions that include: Like-ness, Albertz Benda, New York, USA (2016); Express Yourself: Romance Was Born for Kids, National Gallery of Victoria, Melbourne (2014); Dark Heart, Adelaide Biennale of Australian Art, Adelaide (2014); Theatre of the World, Museum of Old and New Art, Tasmania (2012); Lightness and Gravity, Queensland Gallery of Modern Art, Queensland (2012); Freehand: Recent Australia Drawing, Heide Museum of Modern Art, Melbourne (2010/11); 2009 Wynne Prize for Landscape, Art Gallery of New South Wales, Sydney (2009); Half a World Away: Drawings from Glasgow, Sao Paulo and Sydney, Hallwalls Contemporary Arts Center, Buffalo, New York (2002).

Barton produced the animated film Oscar Wilde’s The Nightingale and the Rose, which celebrated its world premiere at the 65th Berlin International Film Festival in 2015 and was shown at the 2015 Melbourne International Film Festival . The movie won the Film Victoria Erwin Rado Award for Best Australian Short Film. As a result of the film, in 2015 she was also she was awarded an Australian Film, Television and Radio School Creative Fellowship.

In 2020 her sculptural work, the infinite adjustment of the throat...and then, a smile, was shown in Part One of the exhibition, "Know my name: Australian women artists 1900 to now" at the National Gallery of Australia.

== Artistic practice ==
Barton's paintings are fantasy-like and include female figures merged with flowers and plants. Historically flowers have often been used to represent femininity and female genitalia. In later works she included photographic images of male figures.

Many works are digital collages and she often incorporates gouache, glitter, sequins and markers.

Barton begins a work by making a drawing, perhaps of an emotion, gesture or image from a dream. She then develops the drawings into a highly patterned paintings, working on more than one painting at a time. Each work takes several months to complete.

== Movies ==
In 2022 her debut movie Blaze was released. It tells a story about traumatized young girl with a vivid imagination. She was a director and a co-writer of the script.

Barton and Huna Amweero won Best Feature Film - Original for their feature film script Blaze at the 2022 AWGIE Awards. The script won the 2023 Betty Roland Prize for Scriptwriting at the New South Wales Premier's Literary Awards.

== Collections ==
Barton is represented in galleries across Australia:

- National Gallery of Australia, four prints in her series 'that's when I was another tree' from 2007
- National Gallery of Victoria, Melbourne
- Art Gallery of New South Wales, Sydney
- QAGOMA (Queensland Art Gallery and Gallery of Modern Art), Brisbane
- Art Gallery of South Australia, Adelaide

== Publications ==
Year	Title	Publisher
2015	Del Kathryn Barton - the highway is a disco	A3 Arndt Art Agency
2012	Oscar Wilde - The Nightingale and the Rose	Art & Australia Pty Ltd
2011	Del Kathryn Barton	Piper Press
2008	the whole of everything	Karen Woodbury Gallery

== Images ==
- Del Kathryn Barton 2008 exhibition Karen Woodbury Gallery, Melbourne
- Del Kathryn Barton 2005 exhibition Karen Woodbury Gallery, Melbourne

== Video ==
- Del Kathryn Barton, Wilderness exhibition
- Behind the scenes of ARTIST PROFILE Issue 15's cover shoot, inside Barton's studio

Awards
Preceded by John Beard	Archibald Prize; 2008 for You are what is most beautiful about me, a self portrait with Kell and Arella	Succeeded by Guy Maestri
Preceded by Tim Storrier	Archibald Prize; 2013 for hugo	Succeeded by Fiona Lowry
