= McLean Edwards =

Australian painter

McLean Edwards is an Australian painter and portraitist. In 2019 he was awarded the 2019 Sir John Sulman Prize.

== Early life and education ==
McLean Edwards was born in 1972 in Darwin, Northern Territory to Gregson Edwards and Maria Bredun. McLean Edwards attended the Canberra School of Art.

== Career ==
Edwards' first solo exhibition was in Sydney in 1995; he has since had over 20 solo exhibitions.

His form of portraiture is known as "emotional larceny".

== Recognition and awards ==
Edwards was an Archibald Prize finalist in 2004, 2006, 2007, 2010, and 2013.

He was a Doug Moran National Portrait Prize finalist in 2014.

He is the subject of Tim Storrier's 2017 Doug Moran National Portrait Prize winning The Lunar Savant.

Edwards was awarded ⁣⁣⁣⁣the 2019 Sir John Sulman Prize for his portrait, The First Girl That Knocked on His Door; after being a finalist for the prize in 2001 and 2004. Also in 2019, Edwards won the Kings School Art Prize.

== Collections ==
Edwards' work is collected widely by institutions across Australia, including the University of Queensland Art Museum, Brisbane; Orange Regional Gallery, Orange, New South Wales; and the Australian War Memorial, Canberra. It is also held by many Australian and International private collections.
