= John Beard (artist) =

Welsh artist and painter (born 1943)

John Beard (born 1943) is a Welsh artist and painter born in Aberdare, Wales, now based in Sydney, Lisbon, and London.

== Awards & recognition ==
In 2006, Beard won the 3rd Annual $20,000 National Acquisitive Paddington Art Prize for a painting inspired by the Australian landscape, founded and sponsored by Marlene Antico OAM, Sydney. He also won the Art Gallery of New South Wales Wynne Prize for landscape painting, and, in 2007, he won the Art Gallery of New South Wales Archibald Prize for Portraiture.

== Collections ==
- Artbank Australia, Australia
- Arts Council of Great Britain, England
- Art Gallery of New South Wales, Australia
- Art Gallery of Western Australia, Australia
- Bibliothèque Nationale de France Paris, France
- Buckinghamshire Education Authority, England
- Canberra National Convention Centre, Australia
- Centro do Arte Moderna da Fundacao Calouste Gulbenkian, Portugal
- Curtin University, Perth, Australia
- Gold Coast City Art Gallery, Brisbane, Australia
- The Irving Deal Collection of Contemporary Drawings, Dallas, Texas, USA
- The Kedumba Collection of Contemporary Australian Drawings, NSW Australia.
- Macquarie University, Sydney, Australia
- Mount Gambia Regional Gallery, Mount Gambia, Australia
- Mobil Oil Corporation, Australia
- Murdoch University, Sydney, Australia
- National Gallery of Australia, Canberra, Australia
- National Gallery of Victoria, Melbourne, Australia
- National Library of Wales, United Kingdom
- New England Regional Art Museum, Armidale, Australia
- New Parliament House Collection, Canberra, Australia
- Oxford University, England
- Kunsthalle Darmstadt, Germany
- Queensland Art Gallery, Brisbane, Australia
- Robert Holmes a Court Collection, Perth, Australia
- Royal College of Art, London, England
- Rural and Industries Bank, Australia
- Sarjeant Gallery, Wanganui, New Zealand
- Shell Corporation, Australia
- State Bank of New South Wales, Australia
- State Library, Perth Cultural Centre, Australia
- S.G.I.O. Australia
- Sydney University, Australia
- Tate Gallery, London, England
- University of Melbourne (Victorian College of the Arts), Australia
- University of New South Wales, Sydney, Australia
- University of the Northern Territory, Darwin, Australia
- University of Western Australia, Perth, Australia
- Wollongong Regional Gallery, Australia

== Awards and fellowships ==
- 2007 — Archibald Prize, Art Gallery of NSW
- 2006 — Wynne Prize (landscape), Art Gallery of NSW
- 2006 — $20,000 Annual National Acquisitive Paddington Art Prize
- 1994 — Australia Council, Award to Assist Series of Solo Exhibitions in Europe
- 1989 — Australia Council Major Fellowship, Visual Arts & Craft Board
- 1984 — West Australia Invitation Art Award, Fremantle Art Gallery
- 1983 — Pegasus Art Award, Art Gallery of Western Australia
- 1965 — British Arts Council International Prize and Commission, Aberdare Public Library Mural, Wales
- 1962 — Welsh National Arts Scholarship

== Reviews, articles and essays ==
Arnold, Ken 'Head On: Art with the Brain in Mind', Exhibition catalogue, Science Museum, London. 2002

Angeloro, Dom Headlands, Solo exhibition Liverpool Street Gallery, Sydney, Australia, Sydney Morning Herald, Critics Picks, May 2004.

Bann, Stephen Prelude, John Beard monograph published 2011.

Barker, Penelope Australian Artist Solos at the Tate, Solo-Exhibition, Tate Gallery St Ives, England, Article, State of the Arts Magazine, Australia, April–August 1998.

Beard, John To Infinity and Beyond! Contemporary Australian Art, Commissioned article for ARCO, Madrid <masdearte.com> 2002.

Beard, John Notes for Walkabout and Aisle 2000 – rewritten 2005.

Beard, John A note on the portrait of the artist Hilarie Mais 2005

Beard, John Artist's Notes: The Head-Self Portrait in Context. 2006

Bond, Anthony Form-Image-Sign, The Art Gallery of Western Australia, Perth, Essay, 1984.

Bond, Anthony Visual Odyssey Eastward, Macquarie Galleries Bulletin, Sydney, Vol. 5 no. 1, Article, January 1985.

Bond, Anthony Mindscapes, Art Gallery of New South Wales, Sydney, Catalogue Essay,1989.

Bond, Anthony John Beard greets the Sphinx. John Beard monograph published 2011.

Brampton, Robin John Beard – One Exhibition, Two Continents, Tate Gallery St Ives, England and Art Gallery of New South Wales, Sydney, Australia, The Times & Echo, St. Ives, England, Article, 18 September 1998.

Brampton, Robin John Beard – Tate Gallery St Ives, England, The Times & Echo, St. Ives, England, December 1998.

Brennan, Betsy Art of Darkness, Sydney, Australia, Profile, Vogue Living July–August 2004

Bromfield, David Solo Exhibition – Delaney Galleries, Perth, The West Australian, Review, 1991

Bunyan, Marcus After Image, solo exhibition John Buckley Gallery, Melbourne Australia. Review, Art Blart Blog 2009.

Carlos, Isabel Paisagem : Regresso Ao Furturo, John Beard and James Welling (Solo Exhibition- Galeria Luis Serpa), Expresso 14 January 1995.

Carlos, Isabel John Beard – Solo Exhibition, Galeria Luis Serpa, Lisbon, Portugal, FLASH ART, Review, May–June 1995.

Carver, Toni Tate Triumphant with John Wells and John Beard, Tate Gallery St.Ives England, Times and Echo, Review, 15 May 1998

Catalano, Gary Solo Exhibition-Realities Gallery, Melbourne, The AGE, Review, 4 December 1985.

Catalano, Gary Solo Exhibition-Realities Gallery, Melbourne, The AGE, Review, 31 October 1990.

Chanin, Eileen Contemporary Australian Painting Australian Original, A Sense of Place, Article, Sydney, 1990.

Cinco Dias, Ed. Solo Exhibition – Afinsa Almirante Galeria de Arte, Madrid, Cinco Dias, Review, 22 May 1992.

Cooke, Rachel Australia – Review, The Observer newspaper, 22 September 2013

Davis, Wendy After Image, John Beard at Tate Gallery St Ives (England), Monument, Feature, Issue 30, Sydney, June/July 1999.

Deschka-Hoek, Katharina Der verschwindende Mensch Gesichtlos- die Ästhetik des Diffusen / Faceless- the aesthetics of Diffusion, ReviewRhein-Main-Zeitung, 17 October 2009

Desmond, Michael Six Drawings by John Beard, Catalogue for The Sixth Drawing Biennale, Drill Hall Gallery, Australian National University, Canberra, Australia 2006.

Drury, Nevil John Beard, New Art II, Craftsman House, Sydney, Freature, 1988.

Drury, Nevil Images 1, Contemporary Australian Painting, Craftsman House, Sydney, Feature, 1992.

Dutkiewicz, Adam Solo Exhibition – BMG Galleries, Adelaide, The Advertiser, Review, 1 June 1994.

Eccles, Jeremy Book Review, John Beard Monograph, Eyeline Magazine, July 2012

Eds. Independente Encapuchados, Adraga II, Solo Exhibition, Festival of Capuchos, Costa da Caprica, Portugal, O Independente, Preview, 16 June 1995.

Escribano, Maria Solo Exhibition – Afinsa Almirante Galeria de Arte, Madrid, Nuevo Estillo, Preview, June 1992.

Evans, Louise Solo Exhibition – William Jackson Gallery, London, Australian Associated Press, Article, March 1993.

Faure-Walker, J. Artscribe, No. 43, London, Review, 1984.

Fern, Lynette Solo Exhibition – Macquarie Galleries, Sydney, The Sydney Morning Herald, Review, 11 October 1992.

Gibson, Robin Painting the Century, 101 Portrait Masterpieces 1900–2000, John Beard, Wanganui Heads 1998, National Portrait Gallery, London, Catalogue, 2000.

Goddard, Julian Western Australia Outer Sight (Outer Mind), Xpress, New York, Special Edition, Article, 1984.

Greenberg, Sarah Solo Exhibition – Tate Gallery St Ives, England, The International Art Newspaper, Review, Vol. IX, No. 82., June 1998.

Gries, Reinhold "Menschenbilder in diffusem Licht" Faceless – the aesthetics of Diffusion, Review Offenback Post, 22 October 2009

Grishin, Sasha Mix of powers in brooding moods. Review of solo exhibition. Headlands: John Beard works 1993–2007, Drill Hall Gallery, Canberra, Australia 18 June 2009 ...

Gunn, Grazia Brainwork, Head On: Art with the Brain in Mind, The Science Museum, London, England, Review, Art & Australia, Sydney, 2002.

Held, Von Roland Wer raucht denn da im Kinderzimmer? Gesichtslos – Die Malerei des Diffusen, Faceless – the aesthetics of Diffusion, Review, Darmstädter Echo, 19 September 2009

Helyer, Nigel Pomism, Galerie Düsseldorf, Praxis M4, Autumn Issue, Interview, 1984.

Hill, Peter The Rock and the Head – Boutwell Draper Gallery, Sydney Australia, Review, Sydney Morning Herald "HeadSpace" 6–12 September 2002.

Hill, Peter All Together Now – Liverpool Street Gallery, Sydney, Australia, Sydney Morning Herald, Review, 7–8 February 2004.

Hill, Peter John Beard – Headlands, Liverpool Street Gallery, Sydney, Australia, Sydney Morning Herald, Review, 1–2 May 2004.

Hill, Peter Portrait of a Winner, Art Gallery of New South Wales, Sydney, Australia, The Age, Review, Melbourne, 27 April 2005.

Hill, Peter Collector's Dossier, The Nomad and the Sea. Australian Art Collector, issue 62, 2012

Huther, Christian "Die Welt versinkt in der Dämmerung" Gesichtlos- die Ästhetik des Diffusen/ Faceless – the aesthetics of Diffusion, Review Frankfurter neue Presse, 3 November 2009

Ingram, Terry Solo Exhibition – Afinsa Almirante, Madrid, The Australian Financial Review, Article, 11 June 1992..

Ingram, Terry Sombre Mood in New Collection, Liverpool Street Gallery, Sydney The Australian Financial Review, News Feature, May 2004.

Jackson, Kevin "A hundred and one conceptions", Painting the Century, National Portrait Gallery, London, The Independent, Review, 28 November 2000

Jacobson, Howard The Chicago Art Fair, Modern Painters Vol. 2, No. 2, Summer 1989.

Joch, Dr Peter Gesichtslos – Die Malerei des Diffusen / Faceless- the aesthetics of Diffusion, catalogue essay, September 2009

Journal Letras, Ed. Accrochage 3, Galeria Comicos, Lisbon, Journal Letras, Review, 28 September 1993.

KA-ON "Gesichtslos, Die Malerei des Diffusen", Faceless- the aesthetics of Diffusion, Review, KA-ON Internet-Kunstmagazin, October 2009

Kerr, Joan The Possibilities of a National Portrait Gallery, The National Portrait Gallery, Canberra, Art Monthly Australia, Number 118, Review, April 1999.

Klaushofter, Alex There's no place... New Statesman, London, England, Article, 26 June 1998.

Lindsay, Robert The Shell Collection, Melbourne, Australia, Catalogue Essay, 1995.

Lawson, Valerie Archibald and Me, Art Gallery of New South Wales, Sydney Australia, Sydney Morning Herald 25–26 March 2006.

Lisbon CM, Ed. Accrochage 3, Galeria Comicos, Lisbon Cm, Review 9, October 1993.

Lister, David As I was going down to St Ives, After Adraga – Solo Exhibition, Tate Gallery St Ives, England, The Independent, No. 3,610, Article, 14 May 1998,

Lynn, Elwyn Nobody's Man is Powerful Painter, Solo Exhibition – Macquarie Galleries, Sydney, The Weekend Australian, Review, 26 January 1985.

Lynn, Elwyn Solo Exhibition – Macquarie Galleries, Sydney, The Weekend Australian, Review, 2 November 1986.

Lynn, Elwyn Solo Exhibition – Macquarie Galleries, Sydney, The Weekend Australian, Review, 4 July 1987.

Lynn, Elwyn Arresting Enigmas, Solo Exhibition – Macquarie Galleries, Sydney, The Weekend Australian, Review,13 August 1988.

Lynn, Elwyn Solo Exhibition – Macquarie Galleries, Sydney, The Weekend Australian, Review, 13–14 May 1989.

Lynn, Elwyn Gurus of the Intellect and Indulgent Instinct – Solo Exhibition – Macquarie Galleries, Sydney, The Weekend Australian, Review, May 1990.

Lynn, Elwyn Solo Exhibition -Macquarie Galleries, Sydney, The Weekend Australian, Review, 19–20 October 1991.

Lynn, Elwyn Solo Exhibition – Macquarie Galleries, Sydney, The Weekend Australian, Review, 26–27 October 1991.

Lynton, Norbert Portraits from a Pluralist Century, Painting the Century, 101 Portrait Masterpieces 1900–2000, National Portrait Gallery, London, Catalogue, 2000.

Mannix, Ian Solo Exhibition – William Jackson Gallery, London, Australian Broadcasting, Interview, February 1993.

McCulloch, Alan McCulloch's Encyclopedia of Australian Art, 4th Edition 2006, Aus Art Editions, Australia

McDonald, John The year of the very big head, Archibald Prize, Art Gallery of New South Wales, Sydney Australia, Sydney Morning Herald 17 March 2006

McDonald, John Survey of The 2006 Archibald Prize, Art Gallery of New South Wales, Sydney Australia, Sydney Morning Herald 25–26 March 2006

McDonald, John Solo Exhibition – Macquarie Galleries, Sydney, The National Times, Review, 9 November 1986.

McDonald, John Solo Exhibition – Macquarie Galleries, Sydney, The Sydney Morning Herald, Review, 14 August 1988.

McDonald, John Anarchy and Eclecticism -Solo Exhibition – Macquarie Galleries, Sydney, The Sydney Morning Herald, Review, May 1989.

McDonald, John Solo Exhibition – Macquarie Galleries, Sydney, The Sydney Morning Herald, Review, 7 April 1990.

McDonald, John Regional Identity and Australian Art in Contemporary Australian Painting, Sydney, Essay, 1990.

Mc Ewen, John Critic's Choice, The Rock and the Head – Solo Exhibition, Stephen Lacey Gallery, London, The Sunday Telegraph, Feature, 31 December 2000.

McGillick, Paul After Image, indesign magazine, feature, Sydney, Australia, November 2004, Vol. 19.

McGillick, Paul Exhibitions Overseas – Preview, Monument Magazine, Sydney, Australia 2002.

McGillick, Paul John Beard -The Impossibility of Portraiture, in The Possibility of Portraiture, National Portrait Gallery, Canberra, Catalogue Essay, 1999.

McGillick, Paul Painting with Paradox – Solo Exhibition – Macquarie Galleries, Sydney, Australian Financial Review, Profile,11 October 1991.

McGillick, Paul Brush with a Fugitive – Solo Exhibition – BMG Galleries, Adelaide, Australian Financial Review, Review, 10 June 1994.

Mc Namara TJ Power of working with the grain – Solo Exhibition – Jensen Gallery, Auckland, The New Zealand Herald, 26 September 2000.

Maloon, Terence Solo Exhibition – Macquarie Galleries, Sydney, The Sydney Morning Herald, Review, 26 January 1985.

Marcon, Marco Solo Exhibition – Galerie Düsseldorf, Praxis M, No. 13, July/August 1986.

Millard, Rosie Cutting Edge, Tate Gallery St Ives, England, Art Review, June 1998.

Nazare, Leonor John Beard Galeria Luis Serpa, Solo Exhibition, Lisbon, Portugal, Expresso, Review, 21 January 1995.

O’Connor, Kim It's a Wynne-win for Beard, Wynne Prize, Art Gallery of New South Wales, Wentworth Courier, 29 March 2006.

Packer, William Solo Exhibition – Tate Gallery St Ives, England, The Financial Review, May 1998.

Pearman, Hugh A Brush With History, Painting the Century, National Portrait Gallery, London, The Sunday Times Magazine, Feature, 22 October 2000.

Perez de Azor, J. Solo Exhibition – Afinsa Almirante, Madrid, El Punto, Review, 15–21 May 1992.

Pinharanda, Joao John Beard – Solo Exhibition – Galeria Luis Serpa, Lisbon, Portugal, Publico, Review, 21 January 1995.

Pinharanda, Joao Adraga – Solo Exhibition – Galeria Luis Serpa, Lisbon, Portugal, Publico, Review, 2 February 1995.

Price, Jenna Shades of grey bring home the Archibald, Archibald Prize at the Art Gallery of New South Wales, Sydney, Review Canberra Times 3 March 2007

Pomar, Alexandre Accrochage 3, Galeria Comicos, Lisbon, Expresso, Review, 18 September 1993.

Rosa de Oliveira, E. Accrochage 3, Galeria Comicos, Lisbon, Visao, Review, 30 September 1993.

Ross, Peter Let's face it : the history of the Archibald Prize, book, revised publication 2010

Smee, Sebastian Roll up for the show, Archibald Prize, Art Gallery of New South Wales, Sydney Australia, The Weekend Australian, 25–26 March 2006.

Soares de Oliveira Accrochage 3, Galeria Comicos, Lisbon, Publico, Review, 9 October 1993.

Soares de Oliveira John Beard, Adraga, Solo Exhibition – Galeria Luis Serpa, Lisbon, Portugal, Publico, Review, 14 January 1995.

Simpson, Peter Masterstroke in minding his own beeswax – Solo Exhibition – Jensen Gallery, Auckland, Sunday Star Times, 24 September 2000.

Serraller, F. Calvo Suntuosa Madurez (Sumptuous Maturity) Solo Exhibition – Afinsa Almirante, Madrid, El Pais, Review, 1 June 1992.

Shore, Robert Time and Time Again, Painting the Century, National Portrait Gallery and The Rock and the Head, Stephen Lacey Gallery, London, Feature, February 2001.

Smee, Sebastion Roll up for the Show, The Archibald Prize 2006, The Art Gallery of New South Wales, Sydney, The Week End Australian.

Smith, Terry Solo Exhibition – Macquarie Galleries, Sydney, The Sydney Morning Herald, Review, 14 August 1988.

Snell, Ted From the Western Extremity, Studio International, No.1002, Article, 1983.

Snell, Ted Australian Perspecta 1985, The Art Gallery of New South Wales, Sydney, Catalogue, 1985.

Snell, Ted Solo Exhibition – Galerie Düsseldorf, Perth, The Australian, Review, 24 July 1986.

Snell, Ted John Beard and the Rites of Passage, Art & Australia, Vol. 24, No. 1, Profile, Spring 1986.

Snell, Ted Solo Exhibition – Galerie Düsseldorf, Perth, The Weekend Australian, Review, 28 March 1987.

The Statesman Forging a New Language, Solo Exhibition, New Delhi, India, The Statesman, Review, November 1986.

Tunnicliffe, Wayne John Beard Heads Phase III, Solo Exhibition – Art Gallery of New South Wales, Sydney, Look – Art Gallery of New South Wales Magazine, article, Australia 1998.

Wallace, Marina Head On: Art with the Brain in Mind', Exhibition catalogue, Science Museum, London. 2002

Geoffrey J, Wallis eye to, i" the self in recent art. Catalogue essay, Ballarat fine Art Gallery Ballarat, Victoria, Australia 2007

Watson, Bronwyn Solo Exhibition – Macquarie Galleries, Sydney, The Sydney Morning Herald, Review, 26 June 1987.

Y. A. Solo Exhibition – Afinsa Almirante, Madrid, ABC Cultural, Review, 19 June 1992.

== See also ==
- Art Gallery of NSW

Awards
| Preceded by Marcus Wills | Archibald Prize; 2007 for Portrait of Janet Laurence | Succeeded by Del Kathryn Barton |
