= Rodney Pople =

Australian visual artist (born 1952)

Rodney Pople (born 6 September 1952) is an Australian visual artist.

== Biography ==
Pople was born on 6 September 1952, in Launceston. His works have been the cause of some controversy. Pople studied photography in Tasmania, and sculpture at Slade School of Fine Art, London. He teaches at the National Art School in Sydney.

In 2008, Pople won the Sir John Sulman Prize with a work entitled Stage Fright. In 2010, works in an exhibition entitled "Bellini 21c" were the focus of protests. The works included images of Bellini's San Zaccaria Altarpiece overlaid with pornography.

Pople won the Glover Prize for landscape painting in March 2012 with a work that included the figure of Martin Bryant, the convicted perpetrator of the Port Arthur Massacre in the foreground of the landscape of Port Arthur. Later in that year, a work entitled "Degas's Night" which included Degas' sculpture Little Dancer of Fourteen Years on the background of red-light district in Darlinghurst, New South Wales was also the cause of controversy.

He was an Archibald Prize finalist in 2014 and 2015.
