= Hannaford =

Hannaford is a rather uncommon surname worldwide, emanating from the small village of Hannaford in Devonshire, whose name may have originated as "Hanna's ford" and spread in the 16th-century to nearby towns such as Kingsbridge and Ashburton. Charles Hannaford and his son Charles Arthur Hannaford were English artists of note. Its occurrence in Australia may derive in part from the naturalist Samuel Hannaford, who contributed to the knowledge of Victorian and Tasmanian wildlife, and was editor of the Launceston Times for several years.

Notable people with this surname include:

== People ==
- Alf Hannaford (1890–1969), South Australian inventor and industrialist
- Ann Hannaford Lamar (born 1952), American jurist
- Charlie Hannaford (footballer) (1896–1970), English footballer
- Clive Hannaford (1903–1967), Australian politician
- Ernest Hannaford (1879–1955), Australian politician
- Esther Hannaford, Australian singer and actor
- Frederick Hannaford (1830–1898), farmer and politician in South Australia
- George William Hannaford (1852–1927), South Australian orchardist, pioneer apple exporter
- Ian Hannaford (1940–2022), Australian rules footballer
- John Hannaford (Australian politician) (born 1949) Liberal MLC in NSW
- Jule Murat Hannaford (1850–1934), American railroad businessman
- Mark W. Hannaford (1925–1985), American politician
- Peter Hannaford (professor) (born 1939), Australian scientist
- Peter D. Hannaford (1932–2015), American political consultant and author
- Robert Hannaford (born 1944), Australian artist
- Ross Hannaford (1950–2016), Australian musician
- Samuel Hannaford (1835–1911), American architect
- Susannah Hannaford (1790–1861), early immigrant to South Australia
- Tsering Hannaford (born 1987), South Australian artist
- Vin Hannaford (1885–1919), former Australian rules footballer
- Walter Hannaford (1868–1942), farmer and politician in South Australia

== Places ==
- Hannaford, North Dakota, a town in North Dakota
- Hannaford, Queensland, a rural locality in Australia

== Other ==
- Hannaford, American supermarket chain
- Hannaford Bee, an aircraft originally named Rose Parakeet

== See also ==
- Hannafordia, a genus of flowering plants native to Australia
- Elizabeth Hanniford (1909–1977), New York politician
