= Siv Grava =

Australian artist (born 1954)

- Born: 1954 (age 71–72)
- Occupation: Artist
- Awards: Doug Moran National Portrait Prize (1992)

Siv Grava (born 1954), who lives in Elliston, South Australia, is an Australian artist.

Grava won the 1992 Doug Moran National Portrait Prize for Self Portrait.

In 2004 Grava was awarded the Graham F Smith Peace Foundation Peace Award for an Artist in Residence for Hearsay Art Project with John Turpie, an art installation at the Baxter Detention Centre, working with asylum seekers.

== Collections ==
Her works are held in the collections of the Australian Catholic University (Andamooka triptych), and the Tweed Regional Gallery (Self Portrait).

== Exhibitions ==
Grava's work has been exhibited at the Flinders University Museum of Art (Tough(er) Love: Art From Eyre Peninsula, group).
