= Bay to Birdwood =

Motoring event in South Australia

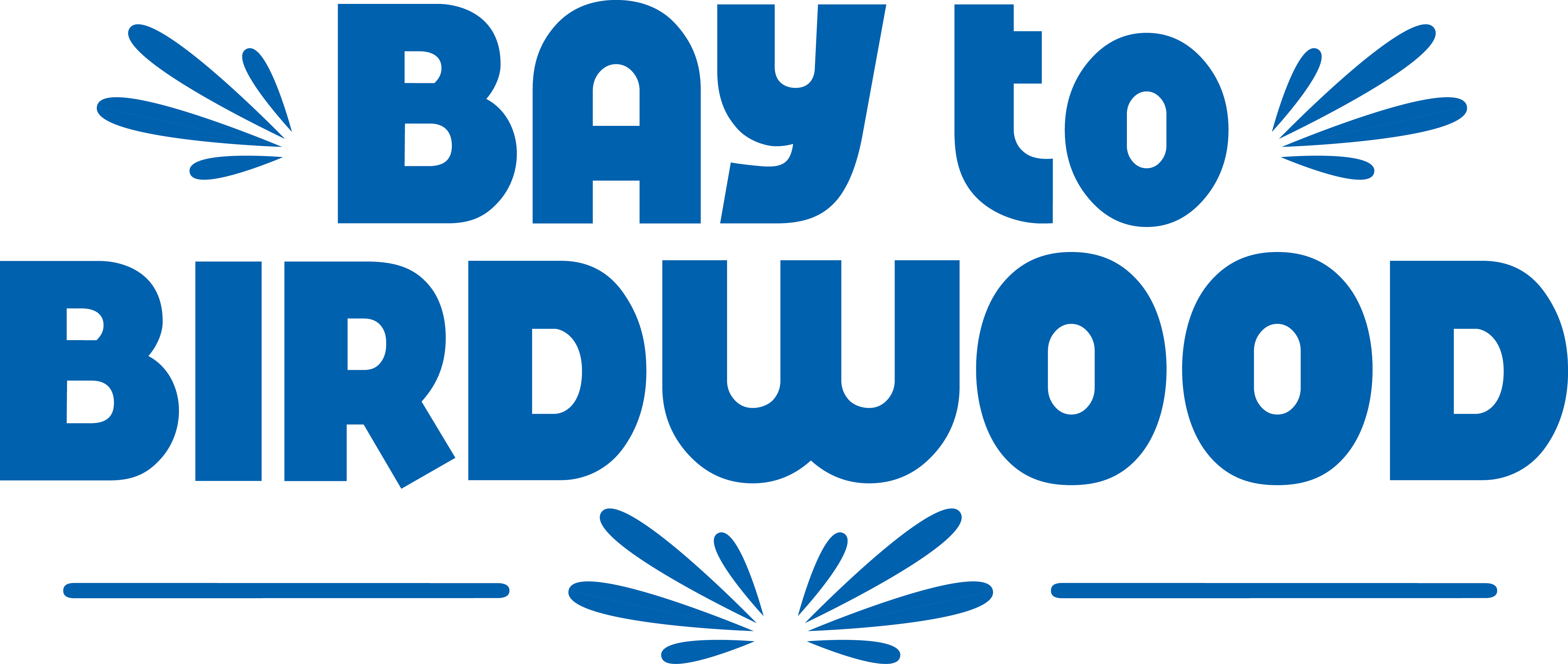
- Status: Active
- Frequency: Annual
- Locations: Birdwood, West Beach and Adelaide, South Australia
- Country: Australia
- Years active: 46
- Founder: Bob Chantrell, Federation of Vintage Car Clubs (SA); Donald Chisholm, National Motor Museum
- Most recent: 2025
- Next event: 2026
- Participants: 1500 plus historic vehicles
- Attendance: 123,000+
- Patron: Governor of South Australia
- Organiser: History Trust of South Australia National Motor Museum, Birdwood
- Website: baytobirdwood.history.sa.gov.au

The RAA Bay to Birdwood is an annual historic motoring event in South Australia, organized by the History Trust of South Australia through the National Motor Museum. It features privately owned vehicles and was previously divided into two events: the Bay to Birdwood Run (for pre-1956 vehicles) and the Bay to Birdwood Classic (for post-1956 vehicles), which alternated between even- and odd-numbered years. Since 2020, the event has expanded to include a broader range of vintage, veteran, and classic cars, along with other road vehicles. The route begins at West Beach in coastal Adelaide and concludes at the National Motor Museum in Birdwood in the Adelaide Hills.

== History ==
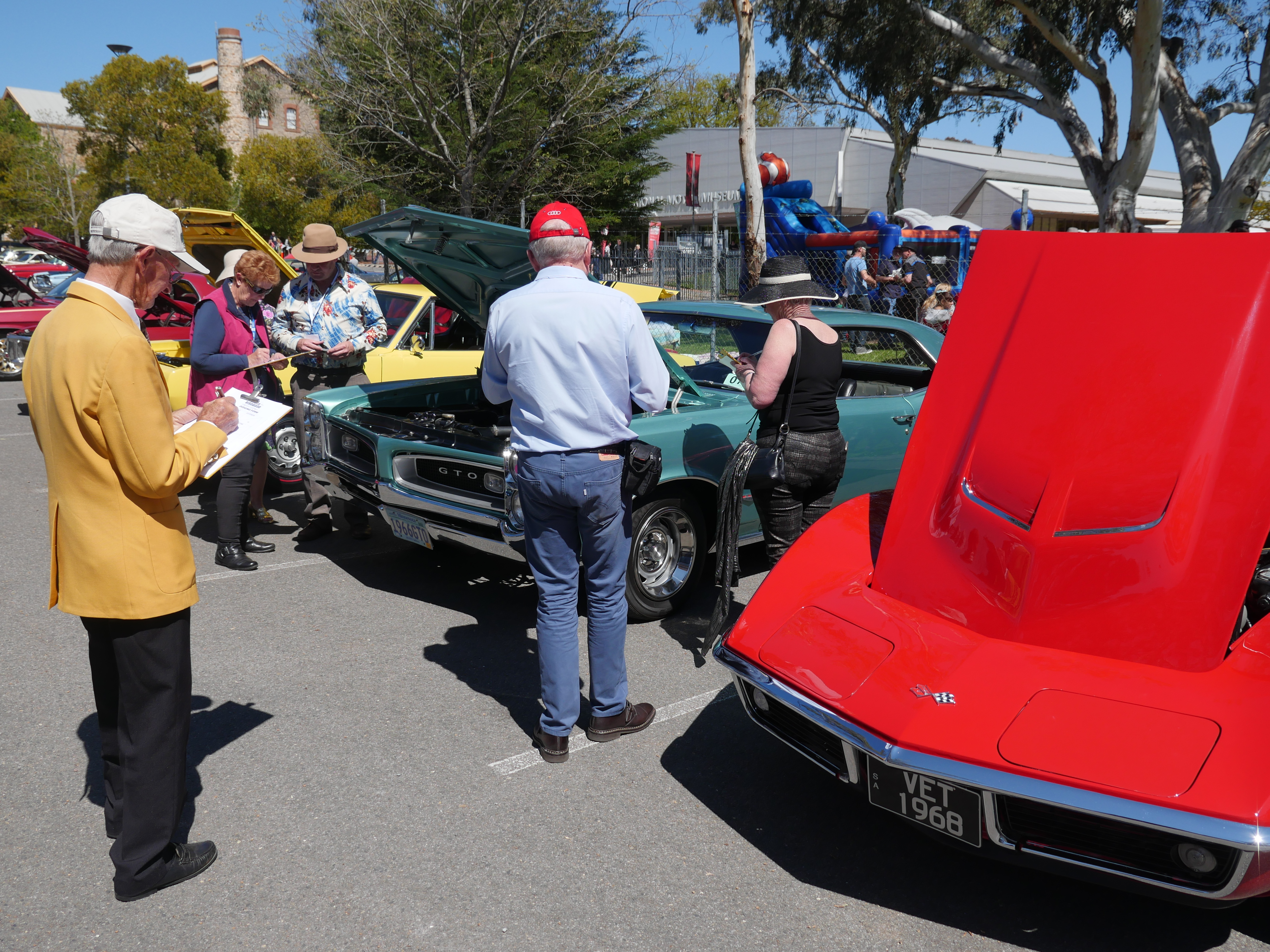
Judging vehicles at the end of the 2015 Bay to Birdwood

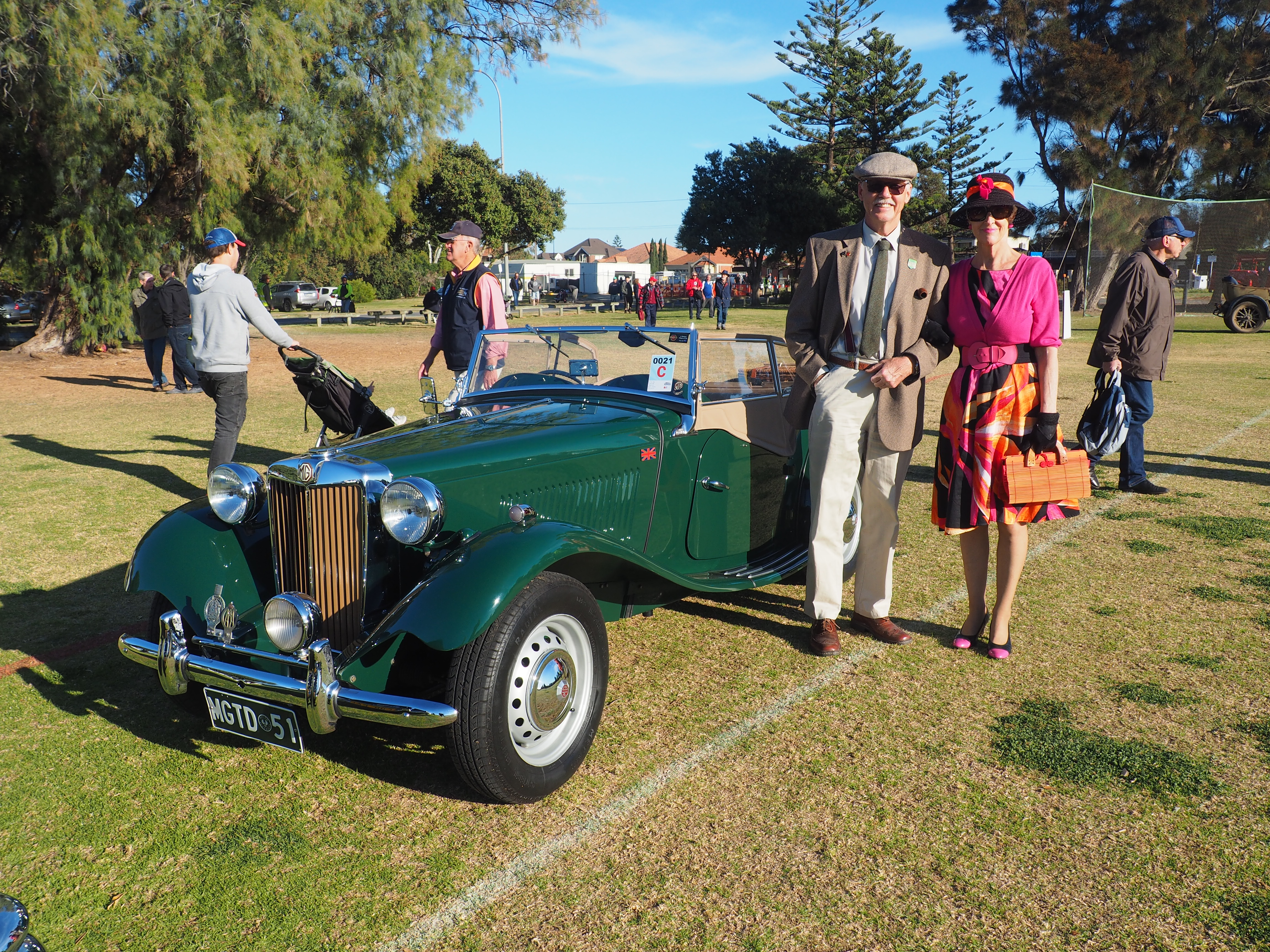
Start of the Bay to Birdwood, 2018

The inaugural Bay to Birdwood took place in 1980, after the idea was raised by Bob Chantrell, of the Federation of Vintage Car Clubs (SA), inspired by the London to Brighton Veteran Car Run. The FVCC approached Donald Chisholm OAM, general manager of the National Motor Museum (also known as the Birdwood Mill, reflecting the building in which it was housed), who agreed to be a co-organiser. He suggested and agreed to provide a perpetual trophy for the "Concours d'Elegance", with its design based on the Shearer Steam Car, which would remain on display at the Mill. S.A.S. Channel 10 would provide television advertising and a documentary after the event, and proceeds from the event would be donated to its Christmas appeal. Starting at Colley Reserve in Glenelg, its name derives from Holdfast Bay, on which Glenelg is situated.

In 2001, several changes took place. SA Water took over as sponsor, and there were several changes to the committee, which would not only organised the Run, but also the Classic event, which had previously been organised by the National Motor Museum. From 2001, both events would be organised by the same committee, and both would follow the same route, the starting point of which was changed from Glenelg to the Barratt Reserve at West Beach, owing to housing developments impacting the event start. The vehicles would turn east past the airport and along Tapleys Hill Road to Anzac Highway, with computer-controlled traffic lights adding smooth passage.

As of its 30th anniversary in 2010, the Bay to Birdwood Run was being held every two years, open to vehicles manufactured before 1956, alternating each year with the Bay to Birdwood Classic for vehicles manufactured from 1956 to 1977. In 2013, for one year only, the route of the Classic changed its previous routing: instead of travelling via North East Road, the cars would travel along Tapleys Hill Road, Anzac Highway and Greenhill Road and then turn into Glen Osmond Road and travel up the South Eastern Freeway. This would take the vehicles past Verdun, Balhannah, Oakbank, Woodside, Charleston, and Mount Torrens en route to Birdwood.

Prior to 2020, the Bay to Birdwood Classic event was held in odd-numbered years and was for vehicles manufactured from 1956 to 1986, thus focusing on vintage and veteran vehicles. Since 2020, the annual event has welcomed all historical vehicles over the age of 30 years.

In 2020, during the COVID-19 pandemic, the Bay to Birdwood was one of the first major large-scale public events to take place after the first national pandemic restrictions and the 40th-anniversary edition was modified to suit the changed conditions for public events. The format was popular, attracting around 90,000 spectators. However, the 2021 event, did not go ahead due to an increased number of cases of a particular strain of COVID-19 in the state.

In 2022, the event changed from the last weekend of September to being held in October and included electric-modified vehicles for the first time, and was capped at 1500 vehicles. In 2023, the order of departure was changed featuring pre-1930s and awards entries and pre-1950s vehicles at the head of the parade.

The archive of programs from all events is available on the RAA Bay to Birdwood website.

== Description ==
The RAA Bay to Birdwood is now one of the largest historical motoring celebrations of its type globally, including vehicles dating back to the early 1900s. Since 2020, the annual event welcomes all historic vehicles 30 years and older.

The event organisers, the History Trust of South Australia, curate the proportion and representative numbers of different eras of motoring heritage with an emphasis on early motoring and pivotal significant periods in motoring history. Thousands of spectators line the approximately 70 km (43 mi) route to view the passing parade of historic motoring from vantage points along the side of the road (SA Police estimates are of 90,000 plus). The run includes antique, veteran, vintage, post-war/early-classic, classic, post-classic and modern classic cars, motorbikes, buses, military vehicles and occasionally fire engines.

The RAA Bay to Birdwood starts on the Adelaide foreshore, leaving from Barratt Reserve in the Adelaide suburb of West Beach. It concludes at the National Motor Museum in the Adelaide Hills town of Birdwood, approximately 70 km (43 mi) from the Start. Participants and spectators can view the hundreds of entrant vehicles displayed on the grounds of the museum. Many drivers dress in attire to match the period of their vehicle.

== Past winners ==
=== Concours d'Elegance ===
Pre-1950 Concours d'Elegance

In 2020, a new trophy was commissioned from South Australia's JamFactory to celebrate pre-1950 Concours d'Elegance winners.

- 2025 Matthew & Kerrie White - 1932 Packard 905 Twin Six
- 2024 Matthew White - 1937 Lincoln Zephyr
- 2023 Malcolm Adamson - 1936 SS Jaguar Airline
- 2022 Michael Ferguson - 1932 Chevrolet BA Confederate Moonlight Speedster
- 2021 No award (event not run due to COVID-19)
- 2020 Geoffrey Mitton – 1904 De Dion-Bouton Type V

Bay to Birdwood Run

The trophy for winners of the Concours d’Elegance, which is based on the design of the Shearer Steam Car, is engraved with the winners' names and held at the museum.

- 2018 Stan Livissiano - 1959 Chrysler Imperial Crown Convertible
- 2016 Ryan, Kirsty and Flynn Turner – 1926 Pontiac
- 2014 John and Robyn Whittaker – 1953 Mercedes 300s
- 2012 Jason Edwards – 1955 MG TF 1500
- 2010 Neil & Gaynor Francis – 1914 Napier T68 Tourer
- 2008 David Lean – 1941 BMW R12 Motorcycle Outfit
- 2006 John & Robyn Whittaker – 1952 Mercedes 220
- 2004 Peter Whelan – 1929 Packard Limousine
- 2002 Claude & Elizabeth Minge – 1924 Nash Hearse
- 2000 Don & Marg Evans – 1948 Jaguar Mk V
- 1998 Donald & Elsa Cuppleditch – 1913 Empire Runabout
- 1996 Allan & Judy Steele – 1924 Rugby Tourer
- 1994 Roly & Helen Forss – 1928 Talbot
- 1992 Chris & Jenny Sorenson – 1904 Di Dion
- 1990 Jim M Ellis – 1928 Packard Tourer
- 1988 Mal Verco – 1912 Ford T Runabout & JM Ellis – 1928 Packard Limousine
- 1986 Colin Davis – 1909 Renault
- 1984 Donald & Elsa Cuppleditch – 1913 Empire Runabout
- 1982 Terry Parker – 1908 Matchless Motorcycle
- 1980 Stephen, Christina, Gabriella & Elizabeth Boros – 1930 Model A Ford

Post-1950 Concours d'Elegance

In 2020, a new trophy was commissioned from South Australia's JamFactory to celebrate post-1950 Concours d'Elegance winners.

- 2025 Roger Mattschoss - 1950 Holden 48-215
- 2024 Mark Kraulis - 1971 Ford XY Falcon GT
- 2023 Corey Armstrong - 1973 Mazda Capella RX-2
- 2022 Simon Harrison - 1966 Ford Cortina MK 1
- 2021 No award (event not run due to COVID)
- 2020 Peter Cadzow – 1968 Ford Falcon XT GT

Bay to Birdwood Classic

- 2019 Alvin Chua - 1957 BMW Isetta 300
- 2017 Paul Mason - 1968 Holden HK Monaro
- 2015 Mark & Julia, Chloe & Amber Kraulis – 1956 Chevrolet Belair
- 2013 Anthony & Luisa Perre – 1967 Chevrolet Chevelle Coupe
- 2011 Peter & Lynda Ninnis – 1958 Ford Skyliner Convertible
- 2009 Leon Parbs – 1969 Ford Capri 1600 GT
- 2007 Greg Meyers – 1971 MV Augusta 125 GTLS Motorcycle
- 2005 Lyell & Julie Blackman – 1956 M.G. A Roadster
- 2003 Mick Mitolo – 1955 M.G. TF Roadster
- 2001 Graham Juttner – 1962 Jaguar Mk II Sedan
- 1999 David Major – 1954 Aston Martin DB2/4 Coupe
- 1997 Cestra Holdings L P Khabbaz – 1965 Ford XP Coupe

=== Preservation award ===
In 2016, the Bay to Birdwood introduced a new judging category and trophy for vehicles that are substantially unaltered from original delivery and have not been restored or modified.

Preservation pre-1950

- Allan Bennett - 1925 Ford Model T Buckboard
- 2024 Lincoln Tyner - 1926 Chrysler H
- 2023 Michael Keogh - 1922 Ford Buckboard
- 2022 Michael Keogh - 1935 Albion Truck
- 2021 No award (event not run due to COVID)
- 2020 Ian Oates – 1912 Ford Model T

Bay to Birdwood Run

- 2018 Elizabeth Murphy - 1935 Chrysler Plymouth
- 2016 Inaugural Preservation Class winner – Natalie Halstead with her late husband's 1958 Sunbeam motorbike

Preservation post-1950

- 2025 Russell Vine - 1985 Holden VK HDT Calais Director
- 2024 Troy Mason - 1992 Volvo 940GL
- 2023 Roberto Formato - 1970 Mazda Cosmo Sport
- 2022 John Johnson - 1987 Volvo 780
- 2021 No award (event not run due to COVID)
- 2020 Ryan Piekarski – 1969 Holden HT Monaro GTS

Bay to Birdwood Classic

- 2019 John McConville 1973 Mercedes Benz 280E
- 2017 Paul Aikman - 1966 Pontiac Bonneville

=== EV Conversion award ===
In 2022, in alignment with a shift within historic vehicle circles, the Bay to Birdwood introduced electric converted historic vehicles. The award is given to the conversion that maintains as much of the originality of the vehicle as possible.

EV Conversion

- 2025 Chris Mander - 1972 BMW 2002
- 2024 Matthew Stead - 1975 BMW 2002
- 2023 Mathew Hoper - 1970 Land Rover 109 Series 2a
- 2022 Eric Rodda - 1985 Holden MB Barina
