= Hanaford =

Hanaford can refer to:

- Hanaford, Illinois, U.S., a village
- Hanaford Valley, a valley in Washington state, U.S.

- Hanaford, Washington, former community located in the valley
- Big Hanaford Power Plant, power plant located in the valley

- Phebe A. Hanaford (1829–1921), American Universalist minister and biographer

== See also ==
- David Hanaford Farmstead, historic farm in Monticello Township, Minnesota, U.S.
- Hannaford, surname
