= National Motor Museum =

National Motor Museum may refer to:

- National Motor Museum, Beaulieu, England
- National Motor Museum, Birdwood, South Australia
