= Jacqui Stockdale =

Australian artist (born 1968)

- Born: 1968 (age 57–58); Melbourne, Victoria, Australia
- Education: Victorian College of the Arts, University of Melbourne; Centre for the Arts, University of Tasmania
- Known for: Painting, photography, collage
- Notable work: Mammo (2024); Historia (2016); Rama Jarra- The Royal Shepherdess (2012)
- Awards: Winner, Doug Moran Photography Award
- Website: jacquistockdale.com

Jacqui Stockdale (born 1968) is an Australian contemporary artist known for exploration of theatrical portraiture, mortality, folklore and masquerade, crossing boundaries between painting, photography, drawing, collage and performance. She explores the diversity of humanity in works that mask and unmask cultural mores, belief systems, rituals and identity. Stockdale has exhibited widely throughout Australia and internationally and her works are held in major galleries in Australia and around the world. In 2012, she won the Moran Contemporary Photographic Prize. In 2014, her work featured in exhibitions at the Louvre, Paris, and Museum Villa Rot, Germany.

Stockdale lives and works in Narrm/Melbourne, Victoria, Australia.

== Early life and education ==
Stockdale was born in 1968, in Narrm/Melbourne, Victoria and grew up in the regional town of Benalla, North East Victoria. Stockdale obtained a Bachelor of Fine Art from the Victorian College of the Arts, majoring in Painting, Melbourne in 1990 and completed a Post-graduate Diploma in Video Art at the Centre for the Arts, University of Tasmania, Hobart (1993).

== Exhibitions ==
Stockdale has exhibited extensively throughout Australia and internationally. Since 1991 Stockdale has held 34 solo exhibitions and over 100 group exhibitions.

In Australia, Stockdale has exhibited in a range of institutions including: Art Gallery of Ballarat, Art Gallery of South Australia, Ballarat International Foto Biennale, Benalla Art Gallery, Bendigo Art Gallery, Casula Powerhouse Arts Centre, Home of the Arts, Gold Coast, Judith Wright Arts Centre, Linden New Art in Melbourne, Museum of Australian Photography, Museum of Old and New Art, National Portrait Gallery (Australia), Nets Victoria, Newcastle Art Gallery, National Gallery of Australia, Ravenswood Australian Women's Art Prize, Sydney Contemporary, Tweed Regional Gallery, University of Queensland Art Museum

Stockdale has exhibited in a range of commercial galleries including: Helen Gory Gallerie — Melbourne, Melbourne Art Fair, Olsen Gallery — Sydney, Spring 1883 - Melbourne, ThisIsNoFantasy — Melbourne, Woods St Gallery — Darwin.

Internationally she has exhibited in:

- Antarisuite Cintermex, Monterrey — Mexico
- Art Basel (Wonderworks) - Hong Kong
- Cape Town Art Fair— South Africa
- Fotofever — Paris
- Louvre (Living Rooms, curated by Robert Wilson) - Paris
- Museum Villa Rot (Alles Masquerade) - Germany
- Switzerland (Outland, Volta10, Basel)

== Awards and recognition ==
Stockdale's work has been included in many award exhibitions and she has been the recipient of numerous awards, including:

- Green Room Awards 2022, Best Visual Design, Dance
- Myer Foundation 2020 National Assistance Program for the Arts
- Doug Moran National Portrait Prize 2012 Winner

== Residencies ==
Stockdale has undertaken residencies in Spain (2014 Australia Council Barcelona Studio), Mexico (2006 Artist in Residence, Circus Oz, Monterrey), and NSW (2004 Bundanon Residency, Shoalhaven).

== Collections ==
- Art Gallery of Ballarat, Victoria
- Art Gallery of South Australia, Adelaide
- Bundanon, Shoalhaven, New South Wales
- Benalla Art Gallery, Victoria
- Home of the Arts, Gold Coast, Queensland
- National Gallery of Australia
- National Portrait Gallery (Australia)
- Newcastle Art Gallery, New South Wales
- Murray Art Museum Albury, New South Wales
- Tasmanian Museum and Art Gallery
- The Watermill Center, USA
