= Susannah Hannaford =

Early settler in South Australia (1790–1861)

Susannah Hannaford, née Elliott (25 December 1790 – 7 April 1861) was an early immigrant to South Australia.

== History ==
Susannah and her husband William Hannaford (28 April 1797 – 1838) lived in Rattery, Devon and brought up a large family. After the death of her husband Susannah liquidated all their assets and boarded the Brightman to emigrate to South Australia, landing in December 1840. The children who made the journey were Richard (19), George (18), Elizabeth (12), Frederick (11), and John (6). Son William arrived in Sydney in 1844 with his wife Harriett nee Toms. Long before any port facilities, they were obliged to wade ashore, Richard carrying his mother on his shoulders. Notable descendants include:

- Son Frederick Hannaford (1829–1898) MHA for Gumeracha 1875–1878
- Grandson Walter Hannaford (1868–1942) MLC for Midland 1912–1941
- Grandson George William Hannaford (1852–1927)
- Great-grandson Ernest Hayler Hannaford (1879–1955) MHA for Murray 1927–1930
- Great-grandson Alfred Hannaford (1890–1969) inventor and industrialist
- Great-grandson (Douglas) Clive Hannaford (1903–1967) Liberal senator for South Australia 1950–1967
- Great-great-great-grandson Ian Hannaford (b. 1940) Port Adelaide footballer
- Great-great-great-grandson Robert Hannaford (b. 1944) distinguished artist
- Great-great-great-great-granddaughter Tsering Hannaford (b. 1987)

== Family ==
William Hannaford (28 April 1797 – 1838) married Susannah Elliott (25 December 1790 – 7 April 1861) in Rattery, Devon on 25 February 1820. Among their children were:

=== Richard ===
- Richard Elliott Hannaford (13 March 1821 – 22 July 1878) married second wife Sarah Stanger (c.1823 – 29 March 1876) in 1851, lived at Bonney's Flat, near Mount Pleasant, killed himself by slitting his throat.

- Mary Eliza Hannaford (14 August 1852 – 1943) married Elijah Goodes (1849–1895) on 27 August 1874
- Sarah Ellen Hannaford (18 November 1853 – 4 April 1921) married David Goodes (1844–1912) on 22 April 1875
- James Richard Hannaford (11 May 1855 – 6 October 1887) also died of a self-inflicted throat wound.
- John Elliott Hannaford (1856 – 19 August 1937) married Mary James ( –1913) on 19 April 1888 lived Bonney's Flat near Blumberg, South Australia. He married again, to Margaret "May" Hounslow (1867– ) on 2 February 1917. They had five children.
- Susannah Rebecca Hannaford (14 December 1863 – 9 February 1942) married Joseph Broadribbe ( – 7 December 1926) on 24 April 1883, lived Rockdale, New South Wales.
- Elizabeth Hannaford (1866–1874) died at Bonneys Flat, Blumberg
- Fanny Hannaford (1867–1917)

=== George ===
- George William ("Williams" in Brightman passenger list but "William" in later usage) Hannaford (24 August 1822 – 21 December 1903) married Ann Cornish (1827–1902) on 26 September 1848, farmed at "Hatchlands" or "Hatchland Estate", Gumeracha.

- Mary Jane Hannaford (29 July 1847 – 8 August 1878) married John Work (1841–1921) on 25 August 1869. They had four children.
- John Hannaford (17 February 1849 – 25 May 1909) married Elizabeth Shearer (1852 – c. 6 November 1924), lived at "Wattle Vale" farm near Riverton, later "Evandale", St Peters.

- Frederick George "Fred" Hannaford (1872–1948) married Adelaide "Addie" Smith (1877–1941) on 29 March 1900 lived "Leeward Farm", Finnis Point, south of Riverton. They had a son and three daughters.
- Elizabeth "Tot" "Tottie" Hannaford (25 August 1878 – 19 July 1966) married John Elliott Kelly (1880–1968) on 17 September 1902, lived at "Solby", Riverton.
- Anne "Annie" Hannaford (31 October 1880 – 1969) married Henry Cornish (1875–) on 21 March 1906
- James William Hannaford (1874 – 6 May 1916) married Elizabeth Maud Kemp (1880 – 19 January 1961) on 5 September 1906, woolgrower of Lower Broughton then Pinkerton Plains near Hamley Bridge. He died at "Leeward Farm", near Riverton as a result of a gun accident which took half his face away. They had two children.
- John William Hannaford (7 May 1876 – ) married Elizabeth Jane Nottle, (1876–1948) on 16 August 1905
- Elizabeth Hannaford (25 August 1878 – )
- Samuel Hannaford (c. April 1883 – 1963) married (Susannah) Alma Ellery (1886–1979) on 17 August 1910, lived Wattle Vale, Riverton

- Claude W. Hannaford (6 June 1911 – ) married Vera St. Clair Hoare ( – ) on 25 February 1939, lived at Rockleigh Farm

- Ian Geoffrey Hannaford (6 March 1940 – )
- Donald Malcolm "Don" Hannaford (15 April 1942 – )
- Robert Hannaford (9 November 1944 – ) distinguished artist married Kate Gilfillan in 1968 and Alison Mitchell in 2007

- Tom Hannaford (c. 1970)
- Georgina Hannaford (c. 1971)
- Tsering Hannaford (19 March 1987 – )

- Kay Hannaford (21 February 1947 – ) business consultant

- Avis Una Hannaford (23 September 1917 – )

- Martha Hannaford (12 December 1884 – 25 September 1945)
- David Hannaford (29 May 1887 – 14 October 1927) married Nellie Ingebor Lykke (1893–1936) on 21 March 1917, lived at Millicent, ran pioneering bus service between that town and Kalangadoo. They had at least one daughter
- Janet Ada Hannaford (1892 – )
- Alfred Hannaford (1890 – 25 August 1969) married (Ivy) Julia Hill ( – ) on 2 April 1913, lived at "Wattle Vale", Riverton. He was inventor of agricultural machinery, founder Alf Hannaford & Co. of Braund Road, Prospect. Subject of a North Terrace plaque.

- Hedley Garfield Hannaford (30 August 1914 – )
- Ivy Joyce Hannaford (14 July 1917 – )
- Murray Alfred Hannaford (24 April 1924 – )

- Samuel Hannaford (2 September 1850 – 31 December 1943) married Isabel Jane Devine on 19 November 1894, lived in Warwick, Queensland. They had two children.
- George William Hannaford (4 January 1852 – 7 November 1927) married Bertha Hayler Whibley, née Linfield, (2 February 1844 – 31 August 1923) in 1876; lived at "Dingo Vale", Cudlee Creek, then "Concord", Paradise, then Kent Town.

- Bertha Ann Hoowoodgee Hannaford (19 May 1876 – 1956) married Allen John Pool (c. 1876 – 20 September 1944) on 12 October 1898, lived at St. Peters
- George Lancelot Linfield Hannaford (18 December 1877 – 25 March 1900) lived at "Angora Glen", Millbrook
- Ernest Hayler Hannaford MHA (21 June 1879 – 21 December 1955) married Florence Elizabeth Pool (1881–1957) in 1904. He was chairman Talunga Council 1912–1920, and mayor of St Peters, lived at "The Briars", Millbrook, later College Street, St. Peters. They had two sons and two daughters.
- Maurice Harcourt Hannaford (21 June 1881 – 2 October 1940) married Lilian Bertha Mitchell on 20 June 1908, lived at Mile End, later Linden Park Gardens.
- Harry Oswell Hannaford (23 April 1884 – 1977) married Isabella Jean "Jane" Lillecrapp (1880–1956) on 31 October 1906, lived Dingo Vale, Cudlee Creek then Belair. They had two sons and four daughters.
- Bessie Josephine Hannaford (14 August 1885 – 1965) married A(lbert) William Lillecrapp (23 September 1882 – 1964) on 10 October 1906, lived in Eden Valley

- Stephen Hannaford (5 April 1857 – 20 September 1924) married Hedwig Hulda Augusta Muller (c. 1859 – 26 September 1902) on 1 August 1882, lived "Hatchlands", Kenton Valley, where he had a large orchard. He married again, to Gertrude A. L. Muller ( – ) on 20 July 1903. They had seven children
- William Hannaford (5 April 1858 – ) married Emma Buckingham (28 April 1855 – ) on 24 June 1890, lived at Saddleworth. They had four children
- Martha Hannaford (26 May 1860 – ) married Richard Rowe ( – ), moved to Kaniva, Victoria
- Albert Frederick Hannaford (8 Nov 1869 – ) married Emma Annie ?? (c. 1862 – 22 June 1926), lived at Rosewater

=== William ===
- William Hannaford (9 January 1825 – 9 March 1869) married Harriet Hannaford, née Toms (10 February 1820 – 24 May 1867). He married again, to Jane Disher ( – ) on 16 September 1868. Was she the Jane Hannaford (c. 1827 – 2 August 1915) of "Heathfield" Aldgate ? They lived at Totness, Mount Barker. He committed suicide by gunshot at the home of his brother George in Gumeracha.

- Susanna Harriet Hannaford ( – ) married Ralph Neate ( – ) in March 1868
- William George Hannaford (26 December 1847 – 30 March 1935) butcher of "Glencoe", Orroroo, married Alice Cleggett (11 July 1852 – 4 May 1942) on 6 August 1878, lived at Murray Bridge. They had eight children
- R. Elliott "Betsy" Hannaford (16 September 1849 – 3 July 1915) married Joseph Jolly ( – ) on 21 October 1868
- Priscilla Hannaford ( – ) married John Cameron ( – ) on 5 February 1879
- Mary Hannaford (11 May 1858 – ) married John Moseley (c. 1848 – ) on 10 July 1881. He may have been a son of William Moseley (9 March 1815 – 30 September 1849)
- Evangeline "Eva" Hannaford (c. 1860 – 17 November 1887) married William Cottle on 16 April 1884

=== Elizabeth ===
- Elizabeth Joan Hannaford (28 April 1828 – 1 November 1900) married Robert George Townsend (1827–1893) on 2 October 1850, lived Coghill's Creek, near Saddleworth

=== Frederick ===
- Frederick Hannaford MHA (20 December 1829 – 16 March 1898) married Elizabeth Sanders (c. 1829 – 16 December 1901) in 1851, lived Mount Bera, near Chain of Ponds, then Wakefield Street, Kent Town. He was chairman Talunga Council 1869–1873 and MP for Gumeracha 1875–1878.

- Susannah "Zannie" Hannaford (12 January 1853 – 15 October 1892) married John Rae McPhie ( – ) on 30 January 1889
- William Hannaford (26 June 1854 – 1855)
- Elliott Hannaford (9 June 1856 – 2 July 1934) married Catherine Isabella "Bella" Kelly (c. 1855 – 22 August 1921) on 22 June 1876, lived "Pekina Lodge" Orroroo, later "Riverside", Cudlee Creek. They had six children.
- Mary Ann Hannaford (12 October 1857 – 1859) born at Riverton Arms
- Lydia "Lillie" Hannaford (8 June 1859 – 16 December 1926) married John Milroy McMillan ( – ) on 24 June 1886
- Frederick Hannaford (4 July 1861 – 12 October 1869) born at Clare mill, died at Cudlee
- William John Hannaford (21 June 1863 – 1 February 1924) married Martha Rosa "Rose" Kelly (c. 1864 – 16 August 1901) on 20 August 1885 lived Mount Bera. He married again, to Mary Rebecca Valentine? Ballantyne? "May" Henderson (c. 1874 – 3 June 1909) on 1 October 1902. He married again, to Amelia "Minnie" Norsworthy ( – ) on 26 June 1911. They had eight children

=== John ===
- John Elliott Hannaford (26 March 1834 – 1 November 1900) married Selina Sophia Sambell (10 April 1833 – 19 September 1918), perhaps on 21 November 1855, lived Broad Oak Farm near Riverton, then Medindie. He and his sister Elizabeth Townsend died within an hour or two of each other.

- David Hannaford (c. 1856 – 12 December 1879)
- Jonathan Hannaford (c. 1859 – 15 June 1881) died at sea
- Alice Hannaford (c. 1861 – 28 December 1901) married Rev. J. H. Ashton ( – ). Their son Tom was mayor of Wallaroo 1915–1917
- Arthur Hannaford (31 December 1863 – 28 March 1930) married Janet Cooper (c. 1864 – 30 September 1954) on 29 October 1884, lived "Almond Dale", Riverton, retired to Willcox Avenue, Prospect. They had seven children.
- Walter Hannaford MLC (20 May 1868 – 29 June 1942) married Clara Evelyn Bowden (1868–1960) on 23 March 1899, lived Broad Oak Farm near Riverton. Among their six children was:

- (Douglas) Clive Hannaford (11 January 1903 – 24 October 1967) married Edna May "Bessie" Wood (née Scutt) on 15 March 1926. He was Liberal senator for South Australia 1950–1967; noted for speaking against Australian involvement in the Vietnam War.

- Eva Hannaford (7 January 1871 – 31 December 1947) married Rev. Charles Ernest Schafer (7 August 1868 – 21 June 1941), a notorious teetotaler Their four sons were all doctors or dentists
- Edith Hannaford (3 December 1873 – ) lived at Gilberton
- Florence Hannaford (22 February 1878 – ) lived at Gilberton

The pioneering family founded by James Hannaford (c. 1829 – 4 June 1876), whose activities centred on Teatree Gully, and about whom little is known, are probably not related. He married Ellen Crawley (c. 1830 – 4 May 1914) on 24 November 1850 in a Roman Catholic ceremony. Susannah Hannaford was Baptist and her family were mostly Protestant.
