= George William Hannaford =

South Australian farmer (1852–1927)

George William Hannaford (4 January 1852 – 7 November 1927) was a South Australian orchardist, pioneer of the apple export trade.

== History ==
George William Hannaford was born in Hartley Valley, near Gumeracha, the third son of George Williams Hannaford. He was educated at Tungkillo along with his brothers and sisters, boarding in the town during the week and returning home for the weekends. At age fifteen he and his two elder brothers John (1849–1909) and Samuel (1850–1943) left to establish a farm at Riverton. In 1873 he purchased a property at Oyster Bay (now Stansbury). In 1875 he married, and they left Riverton for the Yorke Peninsula property, which they named "Hoowoodgee", and grew wheat, in rotation with lucerne or mustard.

He was for a time manager of the Government experimental farm at Mannahill.

In 1880 they moved to "Dingo Vale" Cudlee Creek, where he established an apple and pear orchard and an apiary of some 100 hives, founded by queen bees he imported from Italy. In 1897 Hannaford dispatched 100 cases of apples to London as refrigerated cargo per Orotava. They arrived in first class condition and fetched premium prices. He was also a pioneer of exporting fruit to Germany.

He retired to Kent Town, where he died. His remains were interred in the family vault, Cudlee Creek Cemetery.

== Other interests ==
- He was prominent in the formation of a Yorke Peninsula Agricultural and Horticultural Society.
- While at Stansbury he was appointed a Justice of the Peace and served on the local School Board of Advice and Main Roads Board
- He served as a lay preacher for the Baptist Church.
- He was a frequent contributor to the Adelaide press.

== Recognition ==
- He is commemorated by a Jubilee 150 Walkway plaque on North Terrace.

== Family ==
George Hannaford, a descendant of Susannah Hannaford, married Bertha Hayler Whibley, née Linfield, (2 February 1844 – 31 August 1923) in 1876; lived at "Dingo Vale", Cudlee Creek, then "Concord", Paradise, then Kent Town. Their family included:

- Bertha Ann Hoowoodgee Hannaford (19 May 1876 – 1956) married Allen John Pool (c. 1876 – 20 September 1944) on 12 October 1898, lived at St. Peters
- George Lancelot Linfield Hannaford (18 December 1877 – 25 March 1900) lived at "Angora Glen", Millbrook
- Ernest Hayler Hannaford MHA (21 June 1879 – 21 December 1955) married Florence Elizabeth Pool (1881–1957) in 1904. He was chairman Talunga Council 1912–1920, and mayor of St Peters, lived at "The Briars", Millbrook, later College Street, St. Peters. They had two sons and two daughters.
- Maurice Harcourt Hannaford (21 June 1881 – 2 October 1940) married Lilian Bertha Mitchell on 20 June 1908, lived at Mile End, later Linden Park Gardens.
- Harry Oswell Hannaford (23 April 1884 – 1977) married Isabella Jean "Jane" Lillecrapp (1880–1956) on 31 October 1906, lived Dingo Vale, Cudlee Creek then Belair. They had two sons and four daughters.
- Bessie Josephine Hannaford (14 August 1885 – 1965) married A(lbert) William Lillecrapp (23 September 1882 – 1964) on 10 October 1906, lived in Eden Valley
