= Rolf Prince =

Chemical engineering academic

Rudolf George Herman Prince AO (2 August 1928 – 3 July 2017), commonly known as Rolf Prince, was a noted chemical engineering academic, specializing in distillation and mass transfer.

== Life ==
Prince was born in Chemnitz, Germany on 2 August 1928 from a Jewish family. He and his mother moved to Italy in 1936, to Ireland in 1939 and to New Zealand in 1940, and he became a naturalised New Zealand citizen in 1946. He was educated at Christchurch Boys' High School in Christchurch, then studied chemical engineering and chemistry at Canterbury University College of the University of New Zealand graduating in 1949. He then took a PhD at the University of Sydney, Australia, becoming a lecturer there. In 1953 he moved to the UK as a process engineer with The Distillers Company.

From 1958, Prince pursued an academic career, starting as a lecturer at the University of Canterbury, New Zealand, then in 1960 a senior lecturer at the University of Sydney and in 1965 a professor at the University of Queensland, where he established a new department of chemical engineering. From 1969 to 1994 he was professor and head of the department of chemical engineering at the University of Sydney, remaining there until his retirement in 1998.

Prince died in Sydney on 3 July 2017.

=== Family ===
He married Laurel Williamson (19 November 1926 – 7 April 2018), whom he met while a student. They had three children.

== Honours ==
- Officer of the Order of Australia (AO)
- Peter Nicol Russell Memorial Medal from Engineers Australia
- President, Institution of Chemical Engineers 1986–7
- Fellow, Australian Academy of Technology and Engineering
- His portrait was painted by Robert Hannaford and won an Archibald Prize in 1998
