= Finnis Point =

Finniss Point South Australia
- Coordinates: 34.2319°S 138.8191°E
- Postcode(s): 5373
- Time zone: ACST (UTC+9:30)
  - Summer (DST): ACDT (UTC+10:30)
- LGA(s): District Council of Clare and Gilbert Valleys
- State electorate(s): Frome
- Federal division(s): Grey

Finnis Point (or Finniss Point) is a hill in the Belvidere Range and historic locality on the western side, a few kilometres south of Riverton, west of Hamilton and north of Tarlee in South Australia.

A small town of the same name once lay about 3.5 kilometres (2.2 mi) due northwest of the peak at the north end of Finnis Point Road. A school operated there from 1864 to 1893. A Wesleyan Methodist chapel was opened early in 1864. It was one of fourteen churches in the Kapunda Circuit listed in 1863 and the congregation held its first anniversary in October 1864. It was still operating into the early 1940s. The church was on the corner of Finnis Point Road and Leeward Road, and is now a private residence.

Frederick Hannaford MHA had a farm on Finnis Point Road, some 8 kilometres (5.0 mi) south of Riverton.

== Etymology ==
The spelling of the town's name is problematic: "Finniss" was used for earliest land sales and should be correct if it were named for Boyle Travers Finniss (though he was originally "Finnis"). The alternative spelling was, however, too common to be ignored, especially by the nearby Kapunda Herald in the 1920s, when it was the norm. As B. T. Finniss was well known in the colony and it may have been a common spelling error. Some reports use both "Finnis" and "Finniss" in the same article, as early as 1858.
