= History Trust of South Australia =

Statutory body in the state of South Australia

History Trust Of South Australia
- Formation: 1981
- Founded at: Adelaide
- Type: Statutory body
- Legal status: Corporation
- Purpose: Cultural
- Location: Level 2 - Security House, 233 North Terrace, Adelaide
- Board of directors: Board of Trustees
- Key people: Justyna Jochym (CEO) Greg Mackie (former CEO)
- Parent organization: Government of South Australia
- Website: history.sa.gov.au

The History Trust of South Australia, sometimes referred to as History SA, was created as a statutory corporation by the History Trust of South Australia Act 1981, to safeguard South Australia's heritage and to encourage research and public presentations of South Australian history. It operates three museums in the state: the Migration Museum, the National Motor Museum and the South Australian Maritime Museum. It runs the month-long South Australia's History Festival (previously SA History Week) annually, and manages the Adelaidia and SA History Hub websites. It also manages, in collaboration with the State Library of South Australia, the Centre of Democracy.

== History, governance and funding ==
The Trust was established as a body corporate under the David Tonkin government in 1981 by the History Trust of South Australia Act 1981. This Act repealed the Constitutional Museum Act 1978, but does not affect the operation of the South Australian Museum Act 1976 (which governs the South Australian Museum), nor the later Aboriginal Heritage Act 1988 or Heritage Places Act 1993. The Board is responsible to the Minister and its functions are laid out in the Act, including: carrying out, or promoting, research relevant to the history of the State; accumulating and classifying data on any subject of significance to the history of the State; accumulating and caring for objects of historical interest; exhibiting objects of historical or cultural interest; maintaining registers of objects of historical significance to the State; managing museums and other premises placed under the care of the Trust, and several other functions.

One of its first responsibilities was the care of Constitutional Museum, Australia's first political museum, later known as Old Parliament House, before reverting to use by the South Australian Parliament in 1995.

From 2013, the History Trust has been a member of the Federation of Australian Historical Societies.

Reporting to the Minister for the Arts, the Trust's funding and oversight was the responsibility of Arts South Australia until 2018, when the position of Arts Minister was abolished and it was moved, along with Carclew, Patch Theatre Company and Windmill Theatre Company, to the Department of Education.

In July 2019, the state budget slashed funding to the History Trust, Carclew and Windmill, as part of "operational efficiency" cuts.

== Location ==
The offices of the History Trust were at the Torrens Parade Ground for 18 years, before temporarily relocating to 77 Grenfell Street as various organisations wished to create a "veterans' hub" in the Drill Hall.

In 2023, the History Trust moved to the second floor of heritage-listed Security House (previously known as Kelvin House) (Note: Designed by Eric Habershon McMichael, architect of the Odeon Star at Semaphore, in Art Deco style in 1925–6) at 233 North Terrace.

== Governance ==
=== Chief Executive ===
No.	Term	President	Notes
1	1981–2000	Peter Cahalan	
2	2000–2015	Margaret Anderson	
–	2015–2016	Kevin Jones (acting)	
3	2016–2025	Greg Mackie	
–	2025	Kristy Kokegei (acting)	
4	2025–present	Justyna Jochym	

== Functions and activities ==
As of 2019, the History Trust of South Australia operates the Migration Museum in Kintore Avenue, the National Motor Museum at Birdwood and the South Australian Maritime Museum at Port Adelaide. The History Trust is sometimes referred to as History SA.

It manages, in collaboration with the State Library of South Australia, the Centre of Democracy on the corner of North Terrace and Kintore Avenue, The Centre's gallery exhibits treasures from History Trust and State Library collections, as well as items on loan from State Records of South Australia, the Art Gallery of South Australia, the Courts Authority, Parliament House, Government House and private lenders. The exhibits are interactive and intended to appeal to all ages, with some explicitly aimed at engaging younger children. The Centre examines the history of South Australia by looking at key players and issues, showing how democracy evolved in SA, what it meant for Aboriginal Australians and how protests have played a part in developments.

The History Trust also partners with other Australian museums to present exhibitions, manages a Community Museums Program and offers grants for research and writing, and puts on the annual South Australia’s History Festival as well as community events such as the Bay to Birdwood vintage car run.

South Australia's History Festival is a statewide event taking place in May each year, which promotes the state's historical collections, places and stories, through hundreds of events, including talks, tours, walks, workshops, exhibitions and special events. The Festival began in 2004 as SA History Week, growing year on year until it becoming a month-long festival in 2011, and is As of 2019 one of South Australia's largest community events.

The Sir Hubert Wilkins Oration has been presented by the History Trust in association with the Wilkins Project in 2023 and 2025.

=== Websites ===
The SA History Hub and Adelaidia websites were created and are being developed by the History Trust, along with content partners Wakefield Press, the State Library, the Art Gallery of South Australia and the Adelaide City Council Archives.
