= John Shearer & Sons =

John Shearer & Sons was a South Australian farm machinery manufacturer, founded by John Shearer (1845–1932). The company later called itself John Shearer, and their logo says simply Shearer Est. 1877.

== History ==
John and David Shearer were sons of Peter Shearer (c. 1808 – 31 July 1891) and his wife Mary (c. 1814 – 28 May 1908), who migrated in 1852 to South Australia, where their father made a living as stonemason. They later moved to Clare, where the youngest boys attended the local school.

John served his apprenticeship with J. G. Ramsay, a farming implement merchant and manufacturer of Mount Barker and in 1876 set up a workshop and smithy in Mannum, where his brother David joined him in 1877, repairing farm equipment and paddle-steamers. Between 1877 and 1904 they designed and manufactured agricultural equipment. In 1888 they started manufacture of a wrought ploughshare using a resilient grade of steel developed for him by the Meadows company in England. He invented a stump-jumping plough which he manufactured from 1884.

In 1904 John Shearer set up a workshop in Kilkenny, adjacent the railway station. The brothers dissolved their partnership in 1910, around which time John Shearer greatly expanded his Kilkenny factory. Mr and Mrs Shearer moved into their new home on Torrens Road around the same time.

The company John Shearer and Sons was registered in 1923.

Their "Majestic" plough made headline news when introduced to Tipperary Station in the Northern Territory. The Texas-based Tipperary Land Corporation set itself the task of clearing and cultivating 4,850 ha of savannah woodland in their first year of operation, for which purpose they employed four Caterpillar D9 tractors, and a similar number of D7s to clear the ground. They expected their US-manufactured ploughs (plows?) to turn the ground over to a depth of 250mm, but they barely scratched the surface, even when loaded with 5 t of railway iron. Having no time to waste on shipping in replacements, they borrowed a "Majestic" plough, which proved capable. The Shearer salesman, so the story goes, was crestfallen when William Neely, the company's vice-president, cancelled the initial order for ten units, but brightened up when told they would take twenty. Shearer "Sovereign" ploughs were used for subsequent cultivation.

== Family ==
John Shearer (9 September 1845 – 9 August 1932) married Mary Jane Watkins (c. 1856 – 9 February 1942) on 15 July 1871. They had a home at 84 Wilpena Tce, Kilkenny.

- John Albert Shearer (1872 – 31 January 1935) married Emily Larritt ( – ) on 18 January 1899; home 78 Wilpena Tce. Kilkenny. He was a founding partner in John Shearer and Sons 1923, and worked on his uncle David's pioneering motor car.

- John Redvers Dundonald Shearer (1900– ) married Hilda Mary Gask ( – ) on 12 October 1925[9] He was founding partner in John Shearer and Sons 1923.

- Thomas Leslie Shearer (1873 – 27 May 1944) married Elsie Moisella Mary Jane ( – 28 February 1954), lived at Wellington Square, North Adelaide. He was a founding partner in John Shearer and Sons 1923.
- Alwyn Huxley Shearer (1885– ) married Rita Monteith on 23 April 1912. He was a founding partner in John Shearer and Sons 1923.

For more information on the family, see J. & D. Shearer
