= Robert Hannaford =

Australian realist artist

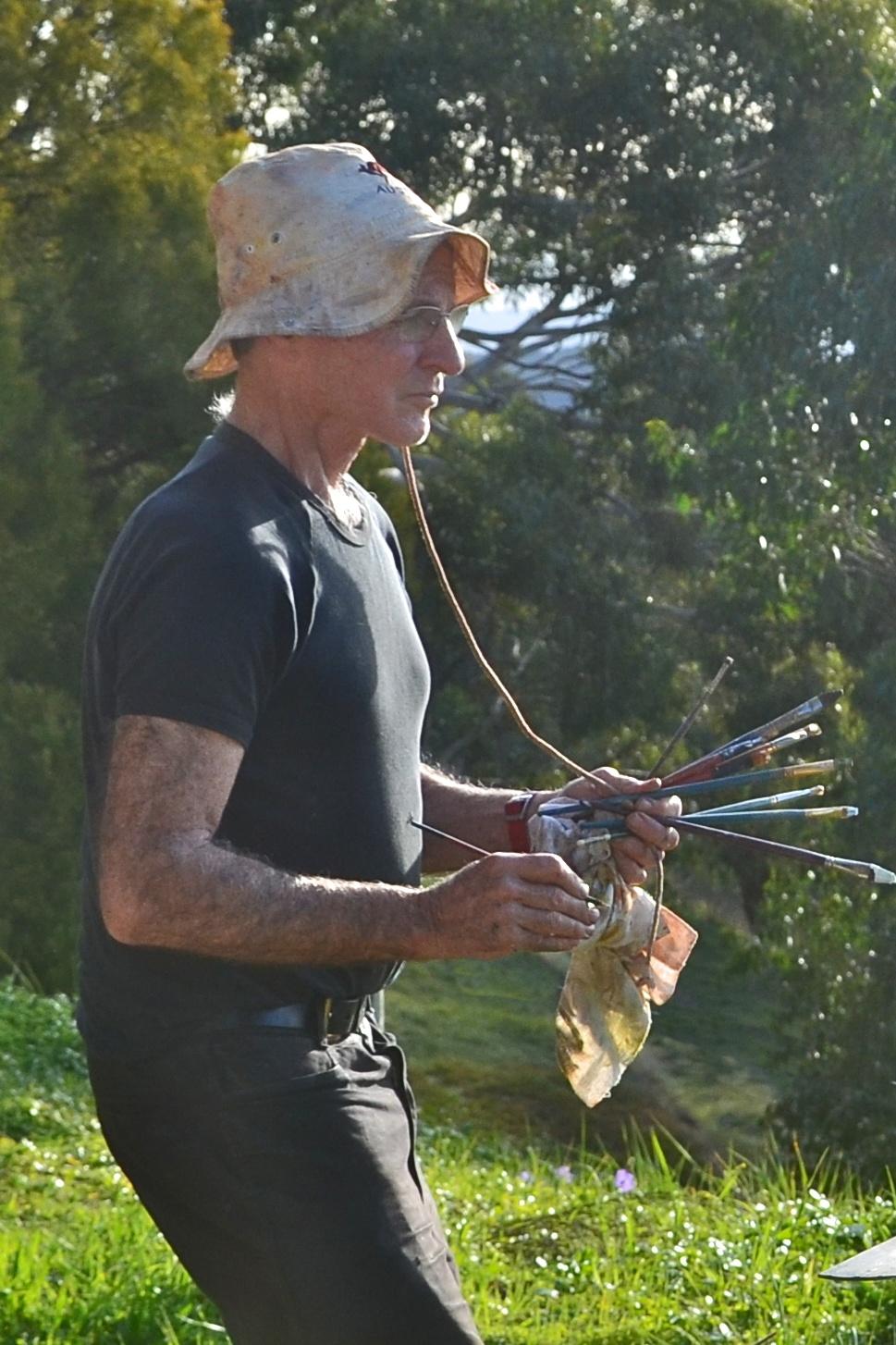
Hannaford painting a landscape near Adelaide in 2011

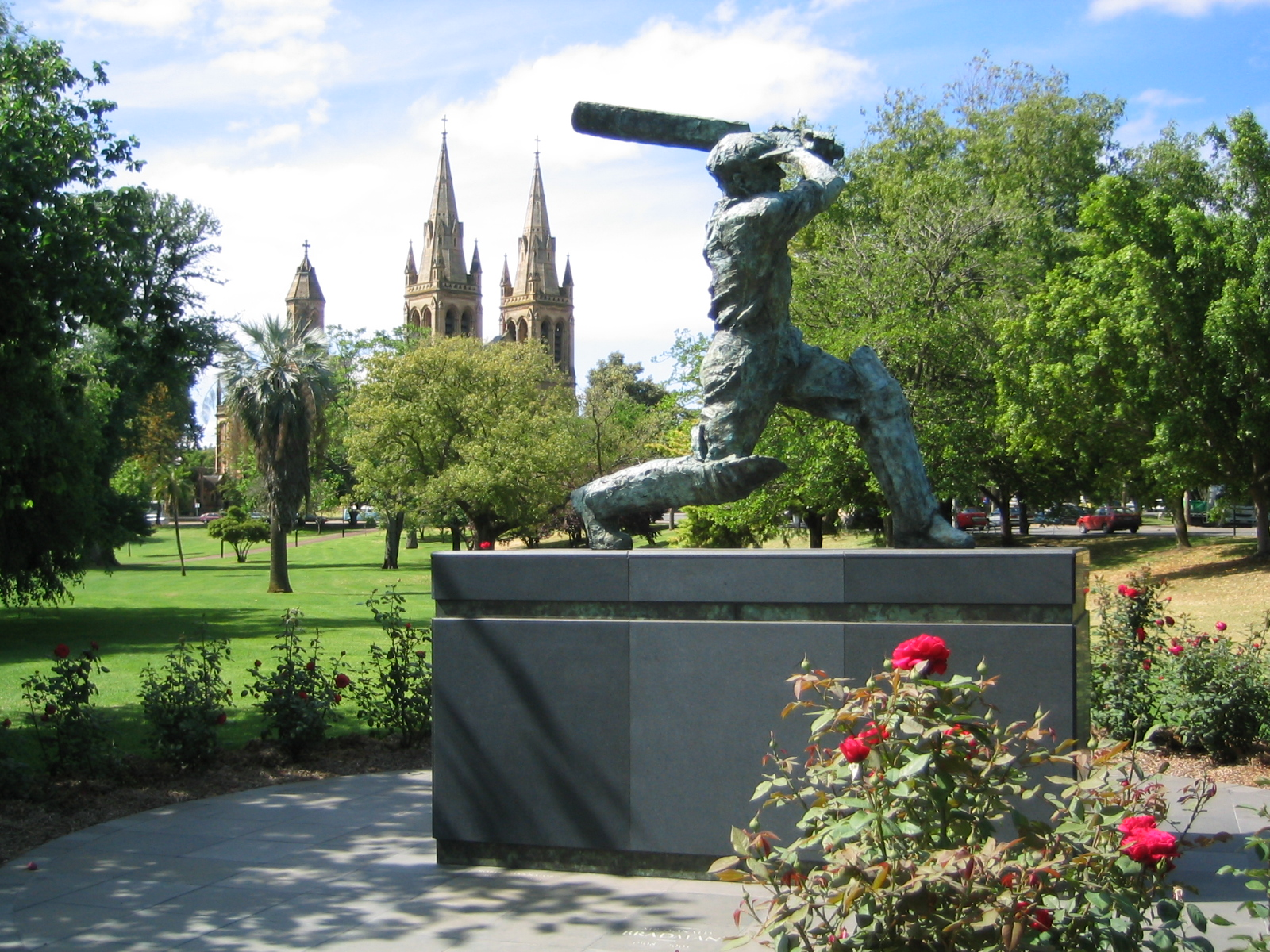
1998: Sir Donald Bradman in the Creswell Gardens

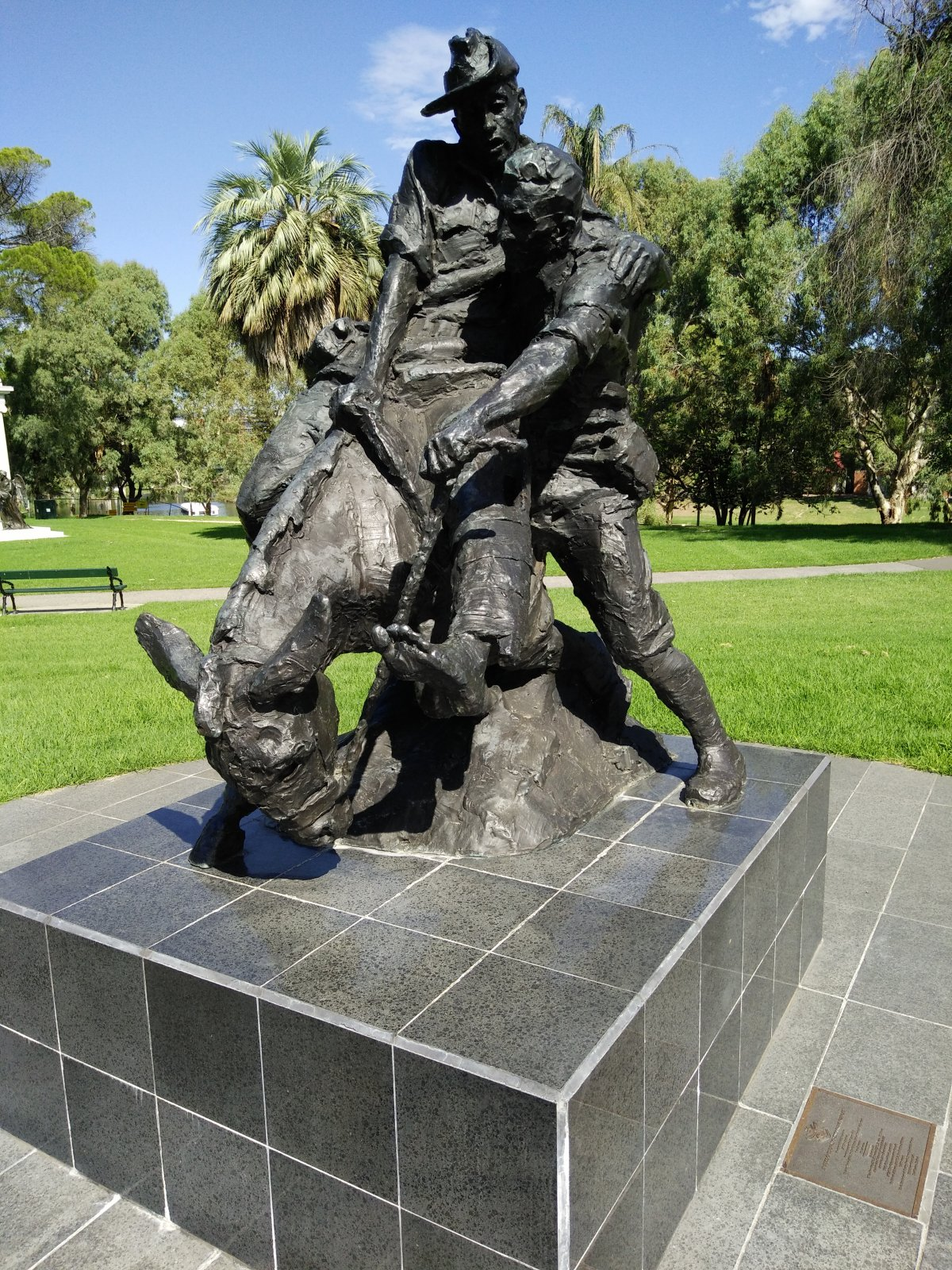
2012: Simpson and his donkey in the Angas Gardens

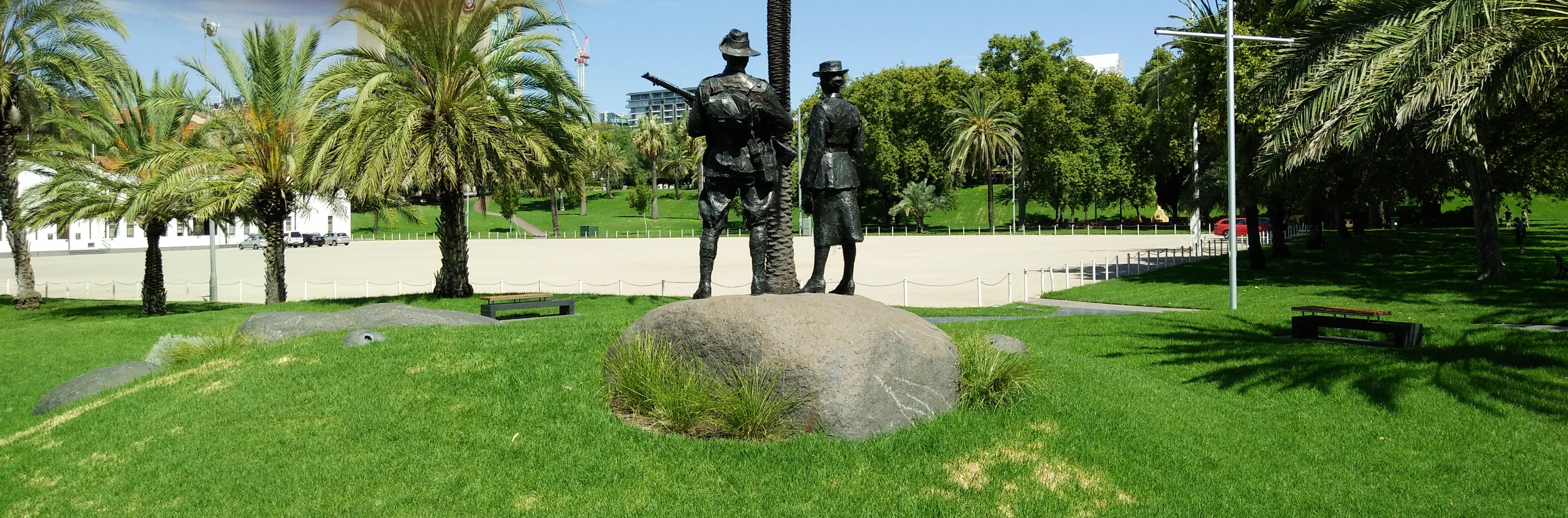
2013: ATSI War Memorial at Torrens Parade Ground

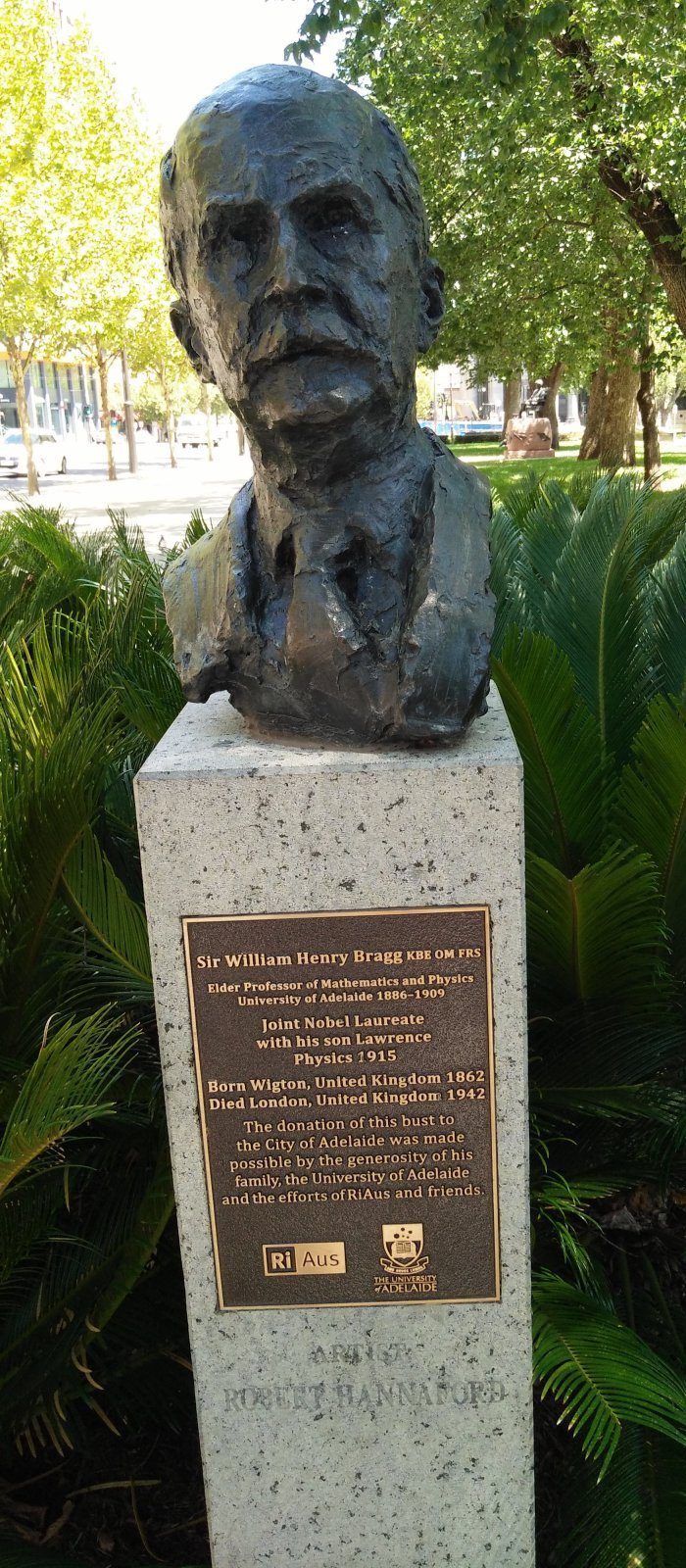
2015: Sir William Henry Bragg in front of Government House

Robert Lyall "Alfie" Hannaford AM is an Australian realist artist notable for his drawings, paintings, portraits and sculptures. He is a great-great-great-grandson of Susannah Hannaford.

== Early life, education, and family ==
Robert Lyall Hannaford was born and grew up on his family's farm in the Gilbert Valley near Riverton, South Australia, attending Riverton Primary and High Schools. Born to Claude and Vera (née Hoare), he has two elder brothers (Ian, footballer and architect, and Donald) and a younger sister (Kay). He is a great-great-great-grandson of Susannah Hannaford.

He won a number of art competitions at primary school, and painted his first landscape painting in oils at 14.

In 1960, aged 16, he moved to Adelaide to complete the last two years of schooling at Prince Alfred College.

In 1962, Hannaford enrolled in life drawing and sculpture classes at the South Australian School of Art, but withdrew and became employed by an advertising agency. From that year, he boarded at Lincoln College, connected to the University of Adelaide, and contributed cartoons to the college magazine as well as the student newspaper, On Dit.

He attended the Ballarat Technical Art School in 1967 and 1968, which was then under the School of Mines in Ballarat. He won the AME Bale Art Scholarship from 1969 until 1973. This provided living expenses and a dwelling in Kew, Melbourne, complete with a large art library and studio. During these years he studied art theory and history informally, and also received a number of portrait commissions, while continuing to paint other types of work. The scholarship paid for travel for study, and he visited Canberra and Sydney to attend exhibitions, and also spent two months of each year in South Australia, focusing on landscape painting.

He returned to South Australia in 1974, living in Riverton, Adelaide, Kangaroo Island, and from 1980–87, the Adelaide suburb of West Hindmarsh.

== Career ==
Although largely self-taught, Hannaford benefited from the mentoring of South Australian artists Hans Heysen and Ivor Hele. He worked as political cartoonist for the Adelaide Advertiser from 1964 to 1967 (between Pat Oliphant and Michael Atchison), before becoming a full-time artist in 1970.

Primarily known as a portrait artist, depicting the likes of Dame Joan Sutherland, Donald Bradman, Paul Keating, and Bob Hawke, he is also known for his landscapes, still lifes, nudes, and sculptures. He has commented on his portraiture that: "Portraiture is an exploration of character that goes beyond photography. It is an ongoing thing over a long period of time. You get elements of various emotions that can be sensed in the painting".

Hannaford first entered the Archibald Prize in 1991 with a portrait of Hugh Stretton. The portrait was shortlisted, and won the 1991/1992 People's Choice Award. To 2018, 26 of his entries had been finalists in 21 of the competitions, and he had been a three-time winner of the People's Choice Award – in 1992, 1996 and 1998.

=== "Black Chicks Talking" Project ===
"Black Chicks Talking" was a project conceived by the actor Leah Purcell and her partner Bain Stewart, and developed by their production company Bungabura Productions. At the invitation of Stewart, in the period 1999 to 2002 Hannaford painted 10 portraits of noted Indigenous Australian women to support the project which had been presented to Hannaford as an initiative to raise funds for a mentoring scheme for young Indigenous people. There was later a court case about the disputed ownership of the portraits. In order to keep the portraits together as a group, they were donated to the Tweed River Gallery. The ten subjects of the portraits are:

- Cilla Malone
- Deborah Mailman
- Frances Rings
- Kathryn Hay
- Leah Purcell
- Lisa Fraser-Gooda
- Rachel Perkins
- Roseanna Angus
- Sharon Finnen
- Tammy Williams

== Exhibitions ==
An exhibition of Hannaford's work was held at Carrick Hill in 2007.

== Recognition, honours and awards ==
- 1990 - Winner Doug Moran Portrait Prize, portrait of Riverton identity Bill (Francis Hogan) with Hannaford's dog Ochre, Tweed River Art Gallery
- 1992 - People's Choice Award at the Archibald Prize, 1991/92 with a portrait of Australian historian and professor Hugh Stretton
- 1996 - People's Choice Award at the Archibald Prize, 1996 with a self-portrait
- 1998 - People's Choice Award at the Archibald Prize, 1998 with a portrait of academic Rolf Prince
- 1998 - Inaugural winner of the Fleurieu Art Prize
- 2001 - Centenary Medal, "For service to the community through art"
- 2014 - Member of the Order of Australia, "For significant service to the visual arts as a painter and sculptor".
- 2014 - Lifetime Achievement prize at Ruby Awards

== Personal life ==
Hannaford met Kate Gilfillan in 1964 and they married in 1968. They moved to Melbourne in 1969, living there for four years, where their two children Tom and Georgina were born. They divorced in 1976.

He has two daughters born in the 1980s: Aisha and Tsering who is also a notable South Australian artist. Her mother is shoemaker Shirley Andris. Like her father, she specialises in portraiture, landscapes, and still life, and has been a finalist for the Archibald prize.

In February 2006 Hannaford was diagnosed with tongue and throat cancer, but was declared in remission by the end of the year. During this time he painted Self Portrait with Tubes, showing himself naked, with a feeding tube sticking out of his stomach.

Hannaford married Alison Mitchell in October 2007.

Hannaford bought a disused farmhouse and outbuildings at Peters Hill, near Riverton, and commenced converting them into a dwelling and studio, where as of 2008 he was living with his wife, artist Alison Mitchell. They were married in 2007. They own and operate Riverton Light Gallery and have exhibited in collaborative exhibitions.

== Selected works ==
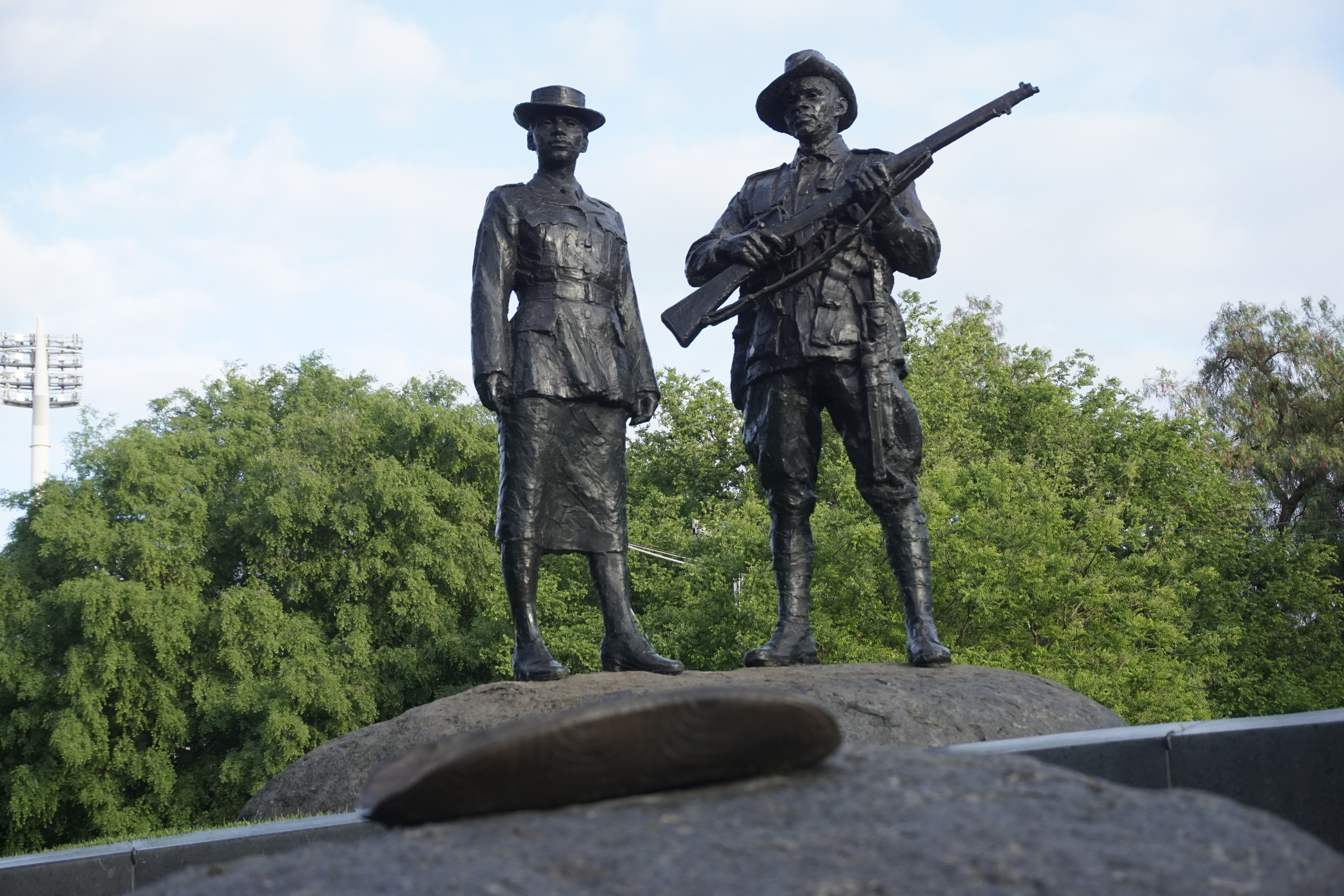
Aboriginal and Torres Strait Islander memorial

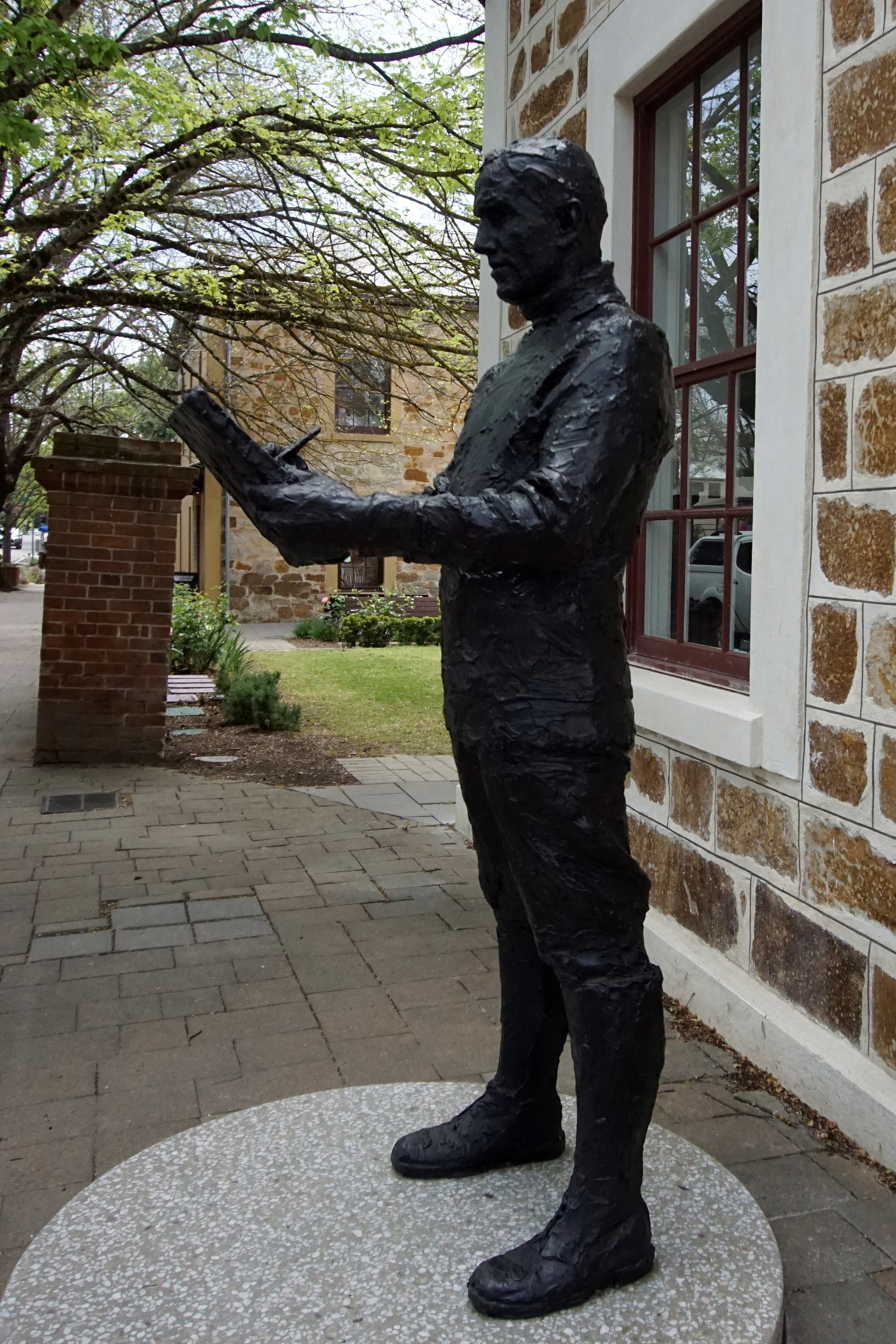
Hans Heysen in Hahndorf

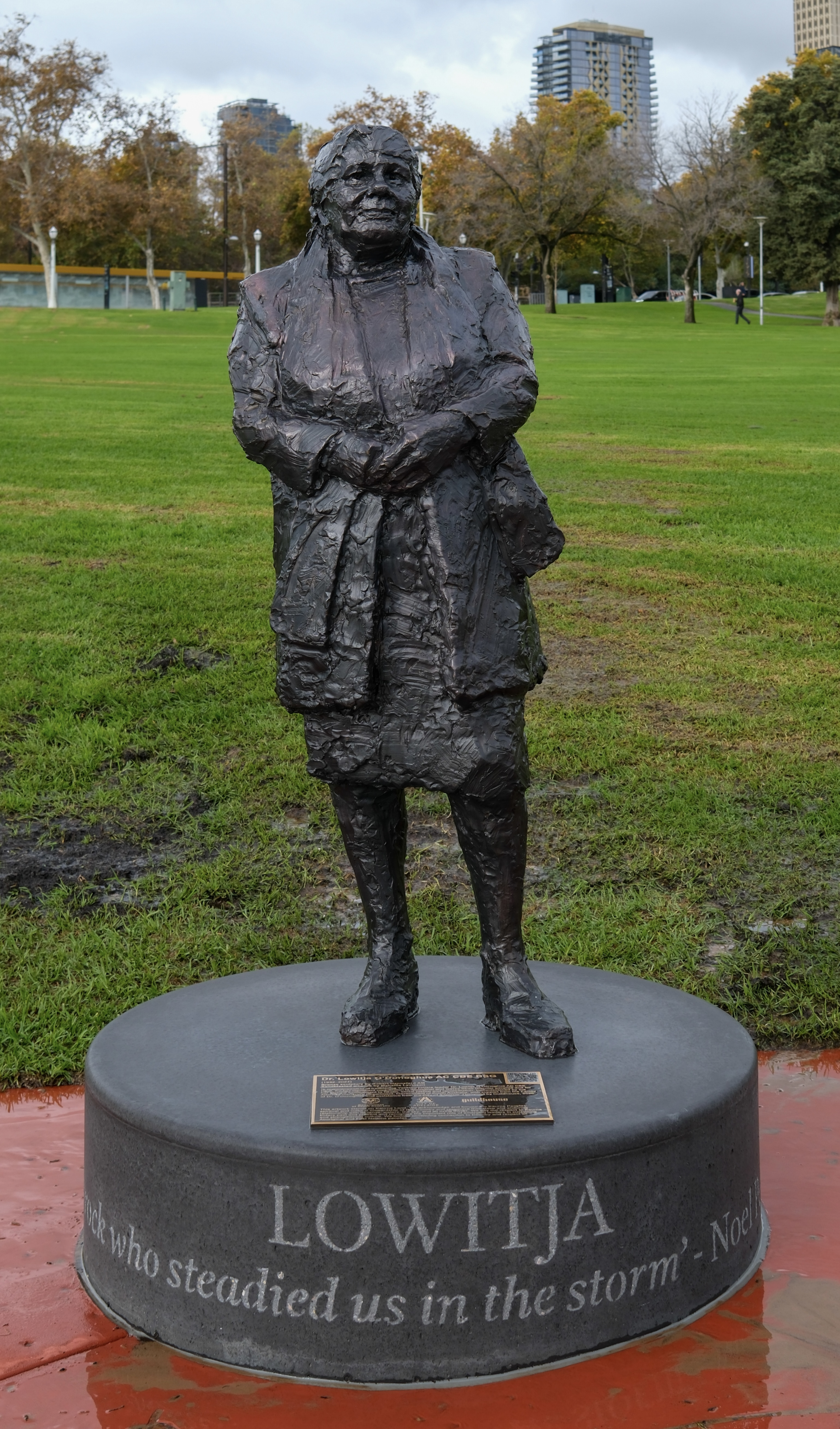
Lowitja O'Donoghue statue, Elder Park, Adelaide, June 2026

=== Commissions ===
- 1972 - Sir Donald Bradman for the Marylebone Cricket Club
- 1977 - Dame Joan Sutherland for the Elizabethan Theatre Trust
- 1977 - Elma Casely for the University of South Australia
- 1980 - John Jefferson Bray for the University of Adelaide
- 1982 - Brodie Thomas Howard for the Howard Family fifth generation Kangaroo Island and current winemaker for Dudley Wines
- 1997 - Paul Keating for Historic Memorials Committee, Parliament House, Canberra
- 1998 - Bronze sculpture of Sir Donald Bradman located in the Creswell Gardens (adjacent to the eastern entrance to the Adelaide Oval), for Adelaide City Council
- 2000 - Bob Hawke for the Bob Hawke Prime Ministerial Library, University of South Australia
- 2001 - The Centenary of Federation 2001 painting, commissioned by the Australian Government
- 2010 - Bronze sculpture of Roy Rene, located on Hindley Street, Adelaide, commissioned by Adelaide City Council
- 2012 - Bronze sculpture of Simpson and his donkey, located in the Angas Gardens (north-east of Creswell Gardens), commissioned by Defence Force Health Services
- 2013 - Bronze sculptures for Aboriginal and Torres Strait Islander War Memorial, located adjacent to the Torrens Parade Ground
- 2015 - Bronze bust of Sir William Henry Bragg on North Terrace in front of Government House, Adelaide
- 2026 – Statue of Lowitja O'Donoghue in Elder Park (as part of an arts project undertaken by the Malinauskas state government honouring six prominent Indigenous South Australians)

=== Other portraits on public display ===
- 1978 - Sir Thomas Playford, Department of Premier and Cabinet, Adelaide
- 1978 - Alexander Maurice Ramsay, National Portrait Gallery, Canberra
- 1985 - Gavin Walkley, St Mark's College, North Adelaide
- 1987 - Tom (Hannaford), Tweed River Art Gallery
- 2001 - Jack Mundey, Sydney Living Museums
- 2004 - Stephen Codrington, Prince Alfred College, Adelaide
- 2006 - Lowitja O'Donoghue, National Portrait Gallery, Canberra
- 2007 - John Bannon, St Mark's College, North Adelaide
- Vice-Chancellors of the University of Adelaide, Mitchell Building, Adelaide
  - Geoffrey Badger (1967–1977)
  - Donald Stranks (1977–1986)

== Archibald Prize ==
=== Finalist ===
Hannaford's work has been selected as an Archibald Prize finalist many times:

- 1992 - Portrait of Hugh Stretton (Winner: People's Choice 1991/92)
- 1993 - Peter van Rood (Image)
- 1993 - Max Harris
- 1994 - Self Portrait
- 1994 - The Lord Mayor
- 1995 - Jarinyanu David Downs, National Portrait Gallery, Canberra (Image)
- 1995 - Self Portrait
- 1996 - Self Portrait (Winner: People's Choice 1996)
- 1996 - Cheryl Hurst
- 1997 - Paul Davies
- 1998 - Paul Keating (Image)
- 1998 - Rolf Prince (Winner: People's Choice 1998) (Image)
- 1999 - Robert Dessaix (in my studio), National Portrait Gallery, Canberra (Image)
- 2001 - Richard Maurovic
- 2002 - Lynda Syddick Napaltjarri (Image)
- 2003 - Rabbi Raymond Apple (Image)
- 2004 - Self-portrait (Image)
- 2005 - Bob Brown (Image)
- 2006 - Tim Flannery (Image)
- 2007 - Tubes (Self-portrait) {Image}
- 2008 - Alison Mitchell (portrait of artist's wife) (Image)
- 2009 - Self-portrait (Image)
- 2010 - Malcolm Fraser (Image)
- 2015 - Self-portrait (Image)
- 2017 - Michael Chaney (Image)
- 2018 - Self-portrait (Image)
- 2022 – Self-portrait

=== Archibald Salon des Refusés ===
The Archibald Salon des Refusés is an exhibition which shows Archibald Prize entries that have been selected to hang in the prize exhibition.

- 2011 - Trevor Jamieson (People's Choice Award)
- 2012 - Ned Cheedy (Image)
- 2014 - Phillip Adams
- 2016 - Self-portrait

Awards
Preceded by	Archibald Prize People's Choice Award; 1992 portrait of Hugh Stretton	Succeeded by
Awards
Preceded by Josonia Palaitis	Archibald Prize People's Choice Award; 1996 self-portrait	Succeeded by Mathew Lynn
Awards
Preceded by Mathew Lynn	Archibald Prize People's Choice Award; 1998 portrait of academic Rolf Prince	Succeeded by Evert Ploeg
