= Doug Moran National Portrait Prize =

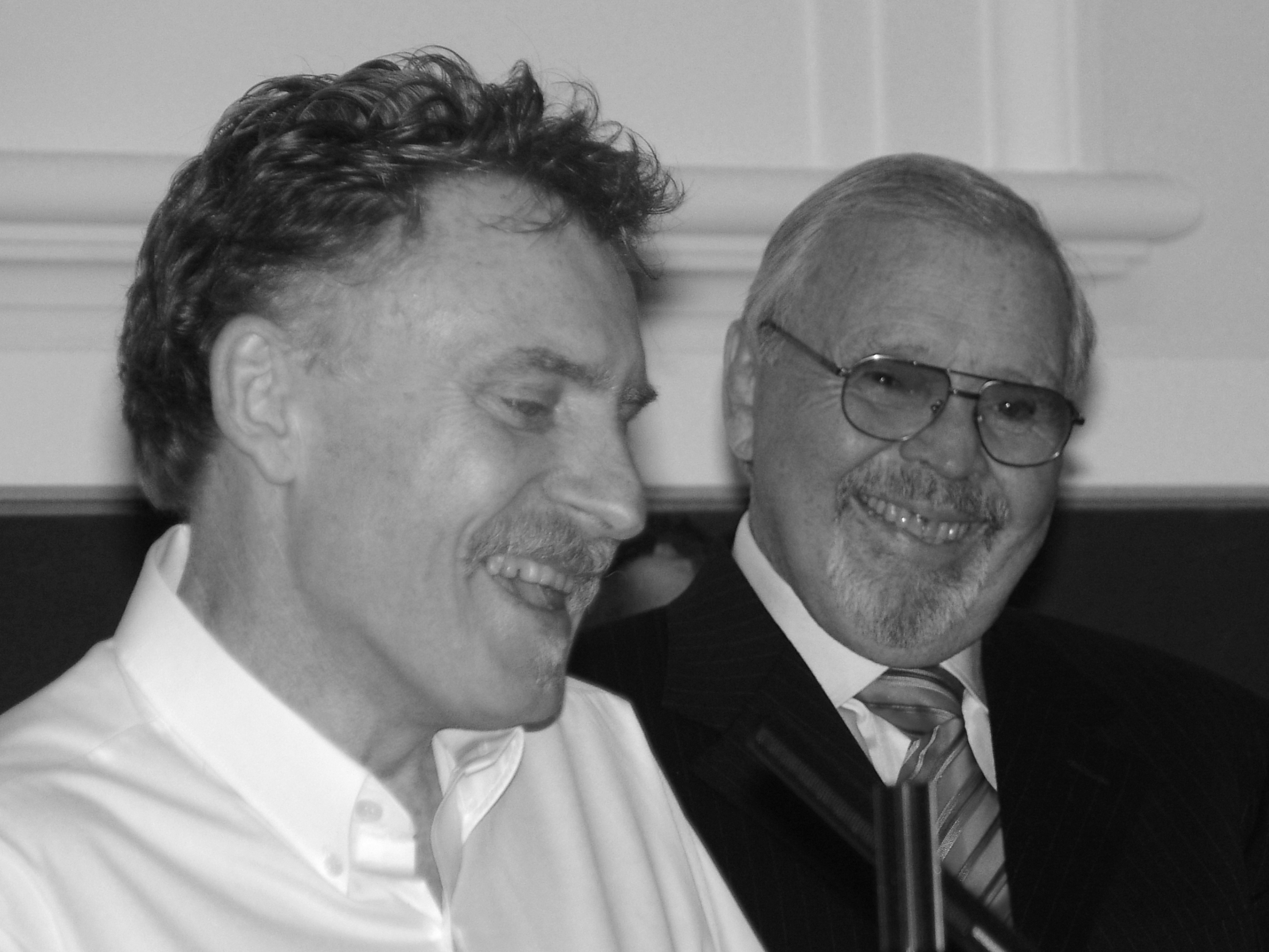
Peter Wegner (left) accepting the Prize in 2006. Right: Doug Moran

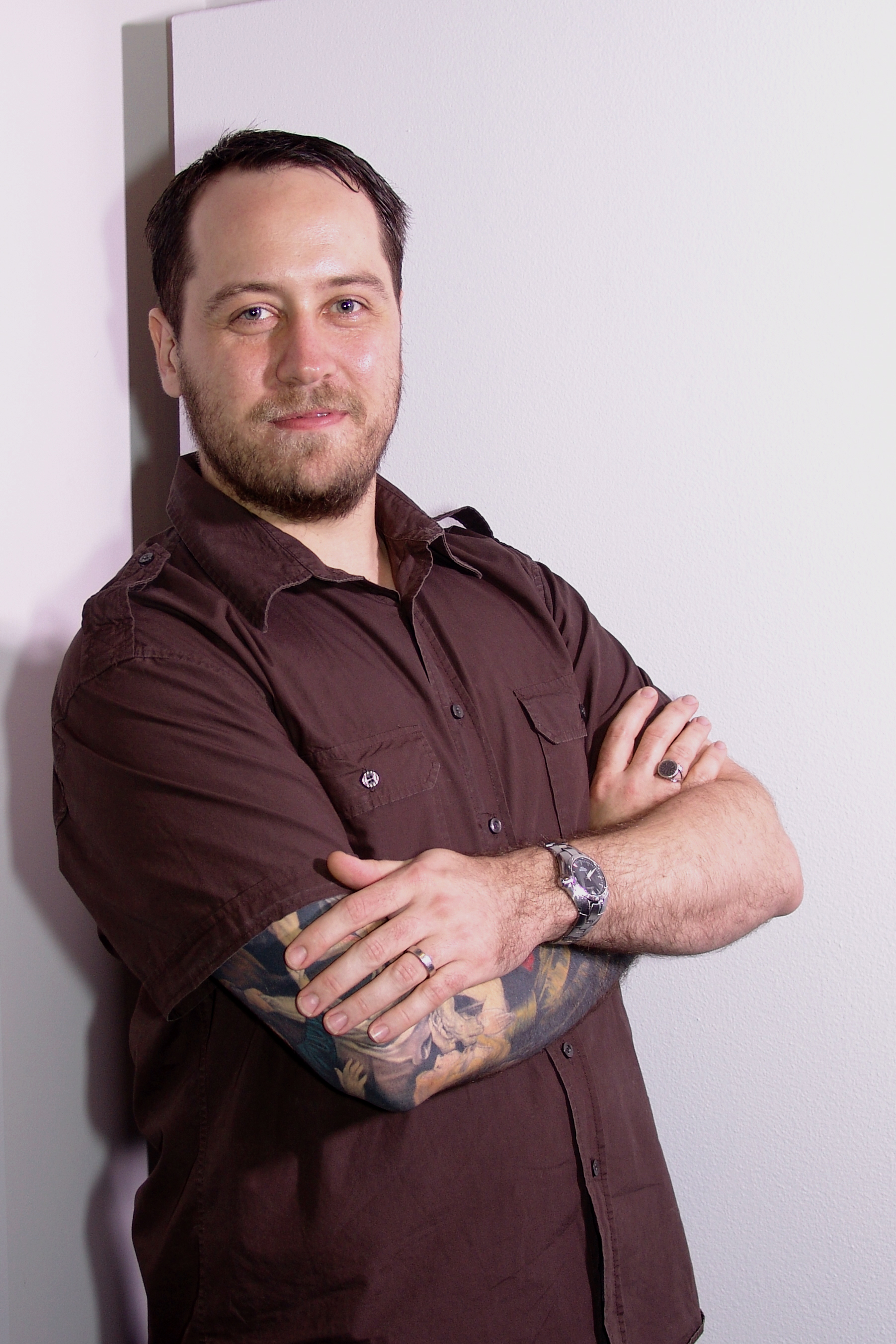
Leslie Rice, 2007 & 2012 Winner

The Doug Moran National Portrait Prize is an annual Australian portrait prize founded by Doug Moran in 1988, the year of Australia's Bicentenary. It is the richest portrait prize in the world with A$150,000 awarded to the winner. The prize is acquisitive; "the winning portrait immediately becomes the property of the Moran Arts Foundation, to be exhibited permanently as part of the Moran Arts Foundation Collection".

The aim of the competition is to promote contemporary Australian portraiture and, as such, entry conditions stipulate that both the artist and their subject be an Australian citizen or resident for at least one year prior to the closing date for entries, however it is not required that the artist or the subject be well known.

There was a court case in 2002–2004 involving the Moran family and the Tweed Shire Council, which ended with an out of court settlement. Following this, there was no longer a $1,000 prize paid to the 30 finalists who did not win, and no longer an international judge. This has now changed back and finalists again receive $1,000.

As of 2024 the prize has been put on hold, with no awards being run in 2023 or 2024.

== List of winners ==
- 1988 – Penny Dowie – Caitlin
- 1990 – Robert Hannaford – Bill
- 1992 – Siv Grava – Self portrait
- 1994 – Josonia Palaitis – John Mills
- 1996 – Greg Creek – Picture of Carolyn Eskdale, 1996
- 1998 – Esther Erlich – Gaunt and glorious – Steve Moneghetti
- 2000 – Kristin Headlam – Self-portrait in bed with the animals
- 2002 – David Fairbairn – Red Portrait Suzanne
- 2004 – Prudence Flint – A Fine Romance #9
- 2006 – Peter Wegner – Wounded Poet 2006
- 2007 – Leslie Rice – Self Portrait 2007
- 2008 – Fiona Lowry – What I Assume You Shall Assume (Self-portrait)
- 2009 – Ben Quilty – There but for the Grace of God Go I, no.2
- 2010 – Michael Zavros – Phoebe is dead
- 2011 – Vincent Fantauzzo – Off Screen portrait of Baz Luhrmann
- 2012 – Leslie Rice – Self Portrait (with the Muses of Painting and Poetry)
- 2013 – Nigel Milsom – Uncle Paddy
- 2014 – Louise Hearman – Bill-1383
- 2015 – Warren Crossett – Self Portrait after St Jerome Flanders
- 2016 – Megan Seres – Scarlett as Colonial Girl
- 2017 – Tim Storrier – The Lunar Savant, a portrait of McLean Edwards.
- 2018 – Lynn Savery – Lynn Savery: self-portrait
- 2019 – what – Robert Forster
- 2020 – no award
- 2021
  - Vincent Fantauzzo – Muse
  - Andrew Greensmith – Two lives one soul
  - Michael Vale – Our ghostly crew
- 2022 - Graeme Drendel - Portrait of Lewis Miller

== Moran Contemporary Photographic Prize ==
The Moran Contemporary Photographic Prize was set in motion in 2007 by the Moran Arts Foundation. This Prize is exhibited at the same time as the Portrait Prize and consists of three sections; Open, Secondary Schools and Primary Schools. Entrants are asked to interpret ‘Contemporary life in Australia’, with an emphasis on Australian's going about their day-to-day lives.

There is a total prize pool of A$100,000, with $50,000 awarded to the winner of the Open division and $1,000 awarded to each of the 30 Finalists. The Secondary division is split into three sections; 7–8 (winner receives $2,000), 9–10 (winner receives $3,000) and 11–12 (winner receives $5,000). Each winner's school wins the same amount for the development of the arts at the school. The 30 finalists of the Primary division each receive a digital camera.

=== Photography Workshop Program ===
The Moran Arts Foundation Photography Workshop Program commenced in 2007 and is part of the Moran Contemporary Photographic Prize.

The free workshops are run by professional photographers at schools Australia wide. Each student is given a digital camera to work with for the day along with guidance from the professional photographer. Basic photography skills are taught along the theme of ‘Visual Storytelling’ and the student's print their favourite shots of the day. In 2015 there were 112 digital photography workshops across Australia in urban, rural and remote areas. Out of the 112 workshops 21 were held in remote areas.

=== Photographic Prize winners ===
==== Open Section ====
- 2007 – Ben Searcy – Waiting for News on David -Terry and Bev Hicks on the five-year anniversary of David's detainment
- 2008 – Belinda Mason – Four Generations
- 2009 – Dean Sewell – A Dry Argument
- 2010 – Dean Sewell – Cockatoo Island Ferry
- 2011 – Jack Atley – Steve Waugh and Sarah Walker
- 2012 – Ashleigh Bradley – Marti, Surfer, Jacqui Stockdale, Rama-Jaara Royal Shepherdess, Kelsey Austin Walsh, The World Inside My Mind, Tobias Titz, Noel Charlie
- 2013 – John Janson-Moore – Nyrripi girl with finger
- 2014 – Suzanne McCorkell – Time out from training
- 2015 – Trent Mitchell – Boy in Boat, Hervey Bay, QLD 2015
- 2016 – Johannes Reinhart – "Mermaid Show"
- 2018 - James Bugg - "Zach"
- 2019 - Tamara Dean - "Endangered"

==== Schools Section (Secondary, Years 11 and 12) ====
- 2007 – Ronnie Ling The Usual Suspects
- 2008 – Alex Case Where You've Been Hiding

==== Schools Section (Secondary, Years 9 and 10) ====
- 2007 – Ronald Au Otamop
- 2008 – Larissa Enright Sinking

==== Schools Section (Secondary, Years 7 and 8) ====
- 2007 – Vonny Chui Constant Change
- 2008 – Alden Leong Pollution
