= Alf Hannaford =

Australian inventor and industrialist (1890–1969)

Alfred Hannaford (1890 – 25 August 1969) was a South Australian inventor and industrialist, remembered for his wheat pickling machines.

== History ==
Alfred Hannaford was a son of John (17 February 1849 – 25 May 1909) and Elizabeth Hannaford, née Shearer (1852 – c. 6 November 1924), and lived at "Wattle Vale" farm near Riverton, South Australia; she moved to 57 Fourth Avenue St. Peters before 1924. Her family relationship with J. & D. Shearer, if any, has not yet been determined. He was educated at Riverton Public School then worked on the family farm.

Some time before 1915 he developed a wheat pickling machine, which found considerable acceptance among practical farmers. The machine was capable of treating eight to twelve bags of wheat with bluestone (copper sulphate) solution and separating smut and other contamination from whole grain prior to planting. The apparatus was based on a trough with a copper Archimedean screw to transport the grain from the input hopper to the delivery spout. A particular feature was its removal of adhering air bubbles, ensuring total wetting of the grain.

He then developed the "Ideal" dry-pickling machine, using basic copper carbonate as the fungus-fighting medium, and coupled the apparatus with a grader to separate healthy fat seed from lower grades, cracked and weed seeds. He then purchased rights to the Farm Type Carter wheat separator, which performed the grading function with a greater degree of discrimination.

The firm of Alf Hannaford & Co., Ltd. was founded in August 1925.

At the company's silver jubilee, the chairman of Horwood Bagshaw Ltd. quoted the statistic that of the 16 million acres of wheat sown annually in Australia, over 14 million had passed through Hannaford's machines.

Hannaford retired as managing director in 1960 and died at the Queen Elizabeth Hospital, Woodville and was cremated. The greater part of his nearly $500,000 fortune was bequeathed to the Waite Agricultural Research Institute.

== Other interests ==
- Hannaford enjoyed travelling, particularly to South Africa and Europe.
- He was an active member of Rotary International.
- He was an adherent of the Methodist church and served as lay preacher.

== Recognition ==
- Hannaford was appointed MBE in 1961.
- He is commemorated by a Jubilee 150 Walkway plaque on North Terrace.

== Family ==
Alfred Hannaford was a great-grandson of Susannah Hannaford, and was closely related to a number of notable South Australian Hannafords. He married (Ivy) Julia Hill ( – 1975) on 2 April 1913, lived at "Wattle Vale", Riverton, later Norman Street, Woodville.. Their children include:

- Hedley Garfield Hannaford (30 August 1914 – 2002) was engaged to Ronda Goldney of Norwood in September 1941.
- Ivy Joyce Hannaford (14 July 1917 – )
- Murray Alfred Hannaford (24 April 1924 – 2000) was engaged to Wilma L. Rauert of Dimboola, Victoria in May 1948.
