= Walter Hannaford =

Australian politician

Walter Hannaford (20 May 1868 – 29 June 1942) was a farmer and politician in South Australia.

== History ==
Walter Hannaford was born in Riverton, South Australia, a son of John Elliott Hannaford (ca.1834 – 1 November 1900) and his wife Selina S. Hannaford née Sambell (ca.1833 – 19 September 1918).

Walter was educated at the local school and at Thomas Caterer's College at Semaphore. As a young man he had a financial interest in a Queensland grazing property, and he took a keen interest in local government there, as well as in the Riverton district, where he was for some time chairman of the District Council of Gilbert.

He took over his father's Riverton property "Broad Oak" around 1898 when his father retired to Medindie and continued to operate the farm.

He was elected to the Legislative Council in 1912, representing the Midland (previously designated "North-East") district, and held it until 1941, when he retired. During his years in Parliament he consistently worked in the interests of primary producers. While a member of the Legislative Council he was a member of the Main Roads Board, the Wheat Commission, and Betting Commission. He was a director of the SA Farmers' Co-operative Union, and was local director of the Citizens' and Producers' Life Assurance Company.

He left a widow, three sons, and two daughters.

== Family ==
Walter Hannaford (20 May 1868 – 29 June 1942), one of many notable descendants of Susannah Hannaford, married Clara Evelyn Bowden (1868–1960) on 23 March 1899, lived at "Broad Oak", Riverton, later "Leiston", Galway Avenue Collinswood. Among their children were:

- Nelson (17 January 1900 – )
- Laura (28 March 1901 – )
- (Douglas) Clive Hannaford (11 January 1903 – 24 October 1967) married Edna May Wood on 16 March 1926. He was Liberal senator for South Australia 1950–1967; noted for speaking against Australian involvement in the Vietnam War.
- (Angas) Kingsley Hannaford (23 July 1906 – 17 January 1928)
- Enid (8 October 1908 – ) married Leslie Wallis on 20 December 1930.
