= Frederick Hannaford =

Australian politician

Frederick Hannaford (20 December 1829 – 16 March 1898) was a farmer and politician in the British colony of South Australia.

He was born in Devonshire, and migrated to South Australia on the ship Brightman with his mother Susannah Hannaford, née Elliott, a sister and four brothers, arriving in December 1840. He began farming on the Adelaide Plains, and later moved to Gumeracha. He set up an apple orchard at Mount Bera, Cudlee Creek, reputedly the first in the colony of South Australia. The farm and orchard were later taken over by his son and grandson. He later moved to the River Gilbert region, and from 1876 with his brother John ran the Riverton Arms Hotel (later Riverton Hotel) in Riverton, and ran a flour milling business in Clare, which he sold to Charles Kimber in 1864.

He was chairman of the District Council of Talunga (later merged into Barossa Council) from 1869 to 1873. (His nephew Ernest Hayler Hannaford (1879–1955) was chairman of the same Council 1912–1920.)

He was member for Gumeracha in the South Australian House of Assembly from February 1875 to April 1878, a colleague of Ebenezer Ward.

He retired to Adelaide and died in Kent Town.

== See also ==
Susannah Hannaford for more on South Australia's Hannaford family and their many notable members.
