= Vin Hannaford =

Australian rules footballer

Personal information
- Full name: Vincent George Hannaford
- Born: 25 April 1885; Melbourne, Victoria
- Died: 6 March 1919 (aged 33); Brighton, Victoria

Playing career^{1}
Years	Club	Games (Goals)
1908	Richmond	1 (0)
- ^{1} Playing statistics correct to the end of 1908.

Vincent George Hannaford (25 April 1885 – 6 March 1919) was a former Australian rules footballer who played with Richmond in the Victorian Football League (VFL).
