= J. & D. Shearer =

Manufacturing company in South Australia

J. & D. Shearer was an engineering and farm machinery manufacturer based in Mannum between 1882 and 1912, founded by John (1845–1932) and David Shearer (1850–1936), and continued separately as John Shearer & Sons of Kilkenny, South Australia, and David Shearer & Co. (later David Shearer Ltd) of Mannum.

== History ==
John and David Shearer were two of a family of six children born to Peter Shearer (c. 1808 – 31 July 1891) and his wife Mary (c. 1814 – 28 May 1908) in Orkney. The family migrated to South Australia in the Omega, arriving in South Australia on 24 August 1852, living first at Port Adelaide, where their father pursued his trade of stonemason, then at Clare, where the youngest boys attended the local school.

At the age of twelve David left to work on a property at Hoyleton, and after two years enrolled with J. S. Cole's Stanley Grammar School in Watervale for a year's tuition; the fees paid for out of his savings. He then worked for two years at his brother William's blacksmith shop at Leasingham. At age 18 he went to work in W. Patterson & Co.'s foundry in Clare. When that business failed he moved to the other end of town where J. G. Ramsay of Mount Barker had a workshop..

John served his apprenticeship with J. G. Ramsay, a farming implement merchant and manufacturer of Mount Barker and in 1876 set up a workshop and smithy in Mannum, where David joined him in 1877, repairing farm equipment and paddle-steamers. Between 1877 and 1904 they designed and manufactured agricultural equipment. In 1888 they started manufacture of a wrought ploughshare using a resilient grade of steel developed for him by Meadow's company in England. A similar steel, "Resiflex" was produced by BHP Steel in the 1920s. He invented a stump-jumping plough which he manufactured from 1884. The company John Shearer and Sons was registered in 1923.

A visitor to the business in 1908, and again in 1910 with a parliamentary committee, said the company had trouble keeping up with demand for their products. He noted strippers made by the firm were lined up outside the factory on the banks of the Murray River awaiting shipment by paddle steamer and barge.

In 1904 the two partners, each wishing to concentrate on their own specialities, separated as far as manufacturing was concerned, then dissolved their partnership in 1910.

== Other interests ==
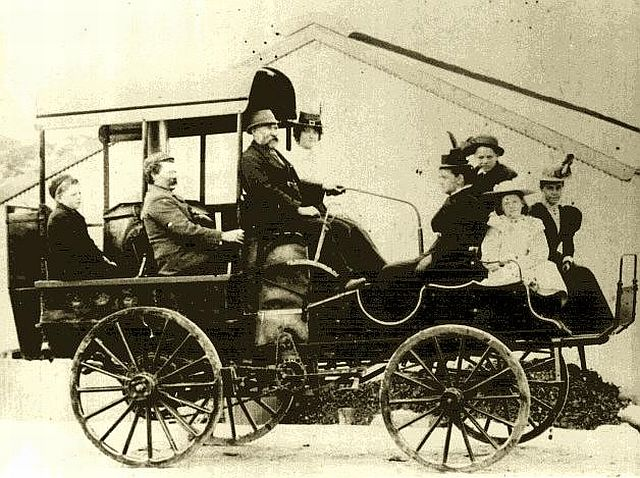
David Shearer's steam-powered car

- In 1898 David Shearer built Australia's first motor car. Steam powered, it had a horizontal boiler with a working pressure of 350 pounds per square inch (2,400 kPa) made by his nephew J. A. Shearer. The engine weighed 2 cwt, and developed 20 horsepower and in 1900 travelled from Mannum to Adelaide and return without problem and was shown at the exhibition of the South Australian Chamber of Manufactures.
- David Shearer served on the Mannum District Council for 40 years. He was a member of the institute committee, the hospital building committee, Progress Association, and Bowling Club and Rifle Club. He took a great interest in astronomy, and became a member of the British Astronomical Society in 1907. His private observatory built at his home in Mannum was fitted with a five-inch O.G. refractor.

== Family ==
Peter Shearer (c. 1808 – 31 July 1891) and Mary née Kirkness (c. 1814 – 28 May 1908) had five sons and one daughter:

- second son James Shearer (1840 – 19 February 1936) married Mary Carlin (c. 1865 – 10 January 1927) on 29 December 1868. He was a wagon maker in Yongala, then worked constructing the railway between Hergott Springs and Oodnadatta, finally with his brothers David and John in Mannum. They had no children, lived at Harvey Street, Woodville.
- William Pottinger Shearer (5 July 1842 – 21 April 1903) married Martha. blacksmith of Coobowie in 1879, farmer with David 1879. They had three sons and two daughters.
- John Shearer (9 September 1845 – 9 August 1932) married Mary Jane Watkins (c. 1856 – 9 February 1942) on 15 July 1871. Home 84 Wilpena Tce, Kilkenny.

- John Albert Shearer (1872 – 31 January 1935) married Emily Larritt ( – ) on 18 January 1899; home 78 Wilpena Tce. Kilkenny. He was a founding partner in John Shearer and Sons 1923, and worked on his uncle David's pioneering motor car.

- John Redvers Dundonald Shearer (1900– ) married Hilda Mary Gask ( – ) on 12 October 1925 He was founding partner in John Shearer and Sons 1923.

- Thomas Leslie Shearer (1873 – 27 May 1944) married Elsie Moisella Mary Jane ( – 28 February 1954), lived at Wellington Square, North Adelaide. He was a founding partner in John Shearer and Sons 1923.
- Ethel Mary Shearer (1875– ) married Samuel Winwood ( – ) on 7 March 1901
- Elsie Jean? Jane? Shearer (1879 – 4 April 1950) married Henry Guy Mildred (13 March 1874 – 24 May 1951), a son of Henry Hay Mildred, on 3 May 1900. They lived in Tasmania.
- Myra Eveline Shearer (1881– ) married Tasmanian dentist H. Briner McChristie ( – ) on 6 September 1900
- Annie Isabel? Isabell? Shearer (1883– ) married James Loden ( – ) on 21 September 1904
- Alwyn Huxley Shearer (1885– ) married Rita Monteith on 23 April 1912. He was a founding partner in John Shearer and Sons 1923.

- David Shearer (7 November 1850 – 15 October 1936) married Mary Elizabeth Williams (c. 1856 – 11 July 1931) on 28 February 1883. They had 2 sons & 1 daughter.
- Elizabeth Shearer (1852 – c. 6 November 1924) married John Hannaford (17 February 1849 – 25 May 1909) in 1871

- Alfred Hannaford (1890 – 25 August 1969) married (Ivy) Julia Hill ( – 1975) on 2 April 1913

- Margaret Shearer (13 March 1856 – 13 June 1946) married Ernest Emil Alexander Schulze ( – c. 18 August 1941) on 16 July 1877, lived at Yongala

== Legacy ==
- David Shearer's steam car, also known as the Shearer Steam Car, was built in Mannum and completed in 1899. In 1900 it was driven to Adelaide city centre and back. It was the third steam car to be built in Australia. It was presented by his grandson, Peter W. Shearer, to the people of South Australia in November 1975. It has been restored, and is an exhibit at the National Motor Museum, Birdwood. The design of the perpetual trophy for the winners of the "Concours d’Elegance" is based on the car, and held at the museum.
- The John Shearer Memorial Gates and the David Shearer Sports Park, both in Mannum, were named for the two brothers.

== Sources ==
- Cumming, D. A. and Moxham, G. They Built South Australia Published by the authors 1986 ISBN 0 9589111 0 X
- Joyce Gibberd, 'Shearer, David (1850–1936)', Australian Dictionary of Biography, National Centre of Biography, Australian National University, https://adb.anu.edu.au/biography/shearer-david-8526/text14767, accessed 26 July 2013.
