= Clive Hannaford =

Australian politician

Senator for South Australia
- In office 22 February 1950 – 24 October 1967
- Succeeded by: Condor Laucke

Personal details
- Born: Douglas Clive Hannaford; 11 January 1903 Riverton, South Australia
- Died: 24 October 1967 (aged 64) Canberra, Australian Capital Territory
- Party: Liberal (1949–67); Independent (1967)
- Spouse: Edna May (Bessie) Hannaford
- Parent(s): Walter and Clara Hannaford
- Occupation: Farmer

Douglas Clive Hannaford (11 January 1903 – 24 October 1967) was an Australian politician. Born in Riverton, South Australia, a son of Walter Hannaford MLC, and one of many notable descendants of Susannah Hannaford, he was educated at Riverton and District High School with a final year at Prince Alfred College in Adelaide before returning to Riverton as a farmer. He served on District Council of Gilbert (later Riverton) and was a co-ordinator of civil defence during World War II, having been rejected for military service due to poor health.

In 1949, he was elected to the Australian Senate as a Liberal Senator for South Australia, taking up his term on 22 February 1950. The Senate membership was increasing from six members per state to 10 per state, so each state had three continuing members, five elected for six-year terms beginning in July 1950 and two (including Hannaford) elected to commence his term when parliament first sat after the election, which was 22 February 1950 and expire on 30 June 1953. There was a double dissolution election in 1951 at which Hannaford was re-elected to conclude his term in 1956. He was elected again in the 1955 and 1961 elections so his term would finish on 30 June 1968.

In February 1967, Hannaford left the Liberal Party to sit as an independent, over his rejection of government policy to send Australian conscripts to the Vietnam War. He joined a march opposing the Vietnam War in Sydney on 22 October 1967 and spoke at the rally following it, despite medical advice not to attend. On 24 October he was speaking during Question Time in Parliament to assert the peaceful nature of the protest when he collapsed and died.

Liberal Condor Laucke was appointed to fill the casual vacancy.
