= National Motor Museum, Birdwood =

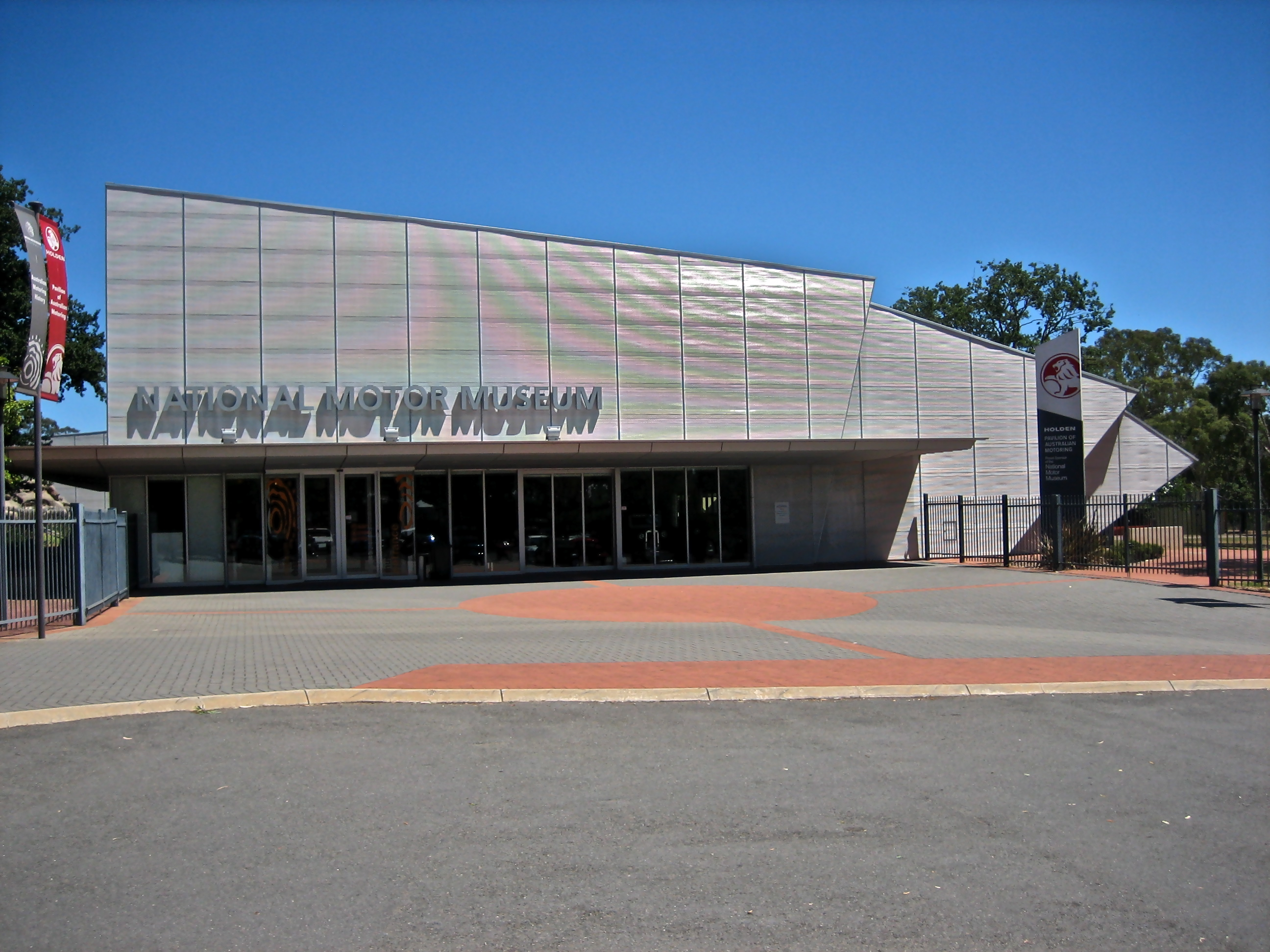
- Established: 1964; 62 years ago
- Location: Shannon Street; Birdwood SA 5234; Australia
- Coordinates: 34°49′11″S 138°57′16″E
- Type: Automobile museum
- Director: Paul Rees
- Website: National Motor Museum

The National Motor Museum, formerly also known as The Old Mill and Birdwood Mill after its initial location, is a social history museum of the History Trust of South Australia focused on Australian motoring history and automobile museum in the Adelaide Hills in the township of Birdwood, South Australia.

== History ==
The National Motor Museum in Birdwood was started by Jack Kaines and Len Vigar after they purchased the old mill buildings in 1964, and opened as a museum the following year in 1965. It was first known as the Birdwood Mill Pioneer, Art and Motor Museum, sold to a private company led by Gavin Sandford-Morgan in 1970. It was purchased by the government of South Australia in 1976, and from 1982 came under the auspices of the History Trust of South Australia.

In 1980 the Federation of Vintage Car Clubs (SA) approached Donald Chisholm OAM, then general manager of the museum, to participate in the inaugural Bay to Birdwood classic car run. Chisholm agreed to be co-organiser, and suggested and agreed to provide a perpetual trophy for the "Concours d'Elegance", with its design based on the Shearer Steam Car, which would remain on display at (as it was then often called) Birdwood Mill.

== Description and uses ==
The National Motor Museum is Australia's largest motor museum, with over 350 vehicles on display as of 2009. It holds a large and historically important collection of cars, motorcycles and commercial vehicles. It is housed in a modern complex adjacent to its original home, "The Old Mill" on Shannon Street, Birdwood.

The museum is the endpoint of the annual Bay to Birdwood, in which vintage, veteran and classic cars and other road vehicles are driven by their owners from the foreshore area of Adelaide through to the Adelaide Hills to finish at the museum, where a festival is held and trophies awarded.

On the first Sunday of November every year, an event named MINIs at the Mill is co-hosted by the museum and the Hot Bricks Club of SA.

== Exhibits ==
The following is a non-exhaustive list of motor vehicles on display:

- 1897 Peugeot Type 17 chassis
- 1899 Shearer Steam Carriage
- 1900 De Dion-Bouton Type E Vis-à-vis
- 1904 Ohlmeyer 'Jigger' Tourer
- 1907 Rover 6hp
- 1908 Talbot
- 1909 Merryweather Fire Engine
- 1910 Daimler Landaulette
- 1913 Newton Bennett 12 hp Tourer
- 1913 Renault Two Seater
- 1914 Dixi R12 Tourer
- 1919 Lincoln Six Tourer
- 1920 Palm Tourer
- 1921 Ford Model T
- 1924 Summit Tourer
- 1925 Straker Squire
- 1925 Rolls-Royce 20 hp coupe with Carrosserie Vanvooren body
- 1925 Hudson Super Six Phaeton
- 1926 Graham Brothers truck
- 1926 Garford flat top truck
- 1927 Packard 5.26 sedan
- 1928 Erskine Model 50 Coupe
- 1928 Dodge Series 128 'Fast Four'
- 1928 Ford Model A Tourer
- 1929 Essex Challenger sedan
- 1929 Austin 7 Tourer
- 1934 Ford V8 coupe utility (unrestored)
- 1935 Chevrolet delivery van
- 1936 Dodge LE 30 Drapers van
- 1936 Leyland Badger
- 1937 Chevrolet Standard sedan
- 1937 Morris 8/40 Series II sedan
- 1939 Willys Overland Model 77 sedan
- 1939 Diamond T Bus
- 1941 Ford One Tonne Utility
- 1948 Chevrolet Stylemaster
- 1948 Hartnett prototype
- 1949 Hillman Minx
- 1952 Vanguard Overland custom rebodied off-roader
- 1952 Edith 197cc Villiers (unrestored shell)
- 1956 Land Rover Series 1 LWB Station Wagon (one of two driven by the Leyland brothers in the film Wheels Across a Wilderness)
- 1956 Rover Model 75
- 1958 Holden FC Special Station Sedan
- 1958 Land Rover Series 1 short wheelbase off-roader
- 1959 Chevrolet Bel Air sedan
- 1959 Chrysler Royal AP2
- 1961 Toyota Tiara RT20 sedan
- 1962 Ford Anglia 105E
- 1963 Zeta Runabout
- 1963 Lightburn Zeta Sports
- 1963 Lightburn Station sedan
- 1965 Zeta Sports
- 1966 Ford Falcon 500 sedan
- 1968 Holden Brougham
- 1969 Holden Panel Van 'Midnight Express'
- 1971 Chrysler Valiant Charger R/T38 coupe racer
- 1972 Kenworth W902 truck
- 1974 Holden Kingswood
- 1974 Datsun 260Z
- 1974 Holden Torana supercharged drag car
- 1976 Holden Sandman
- 1976 Datsun 120Y sedan
- 1976 Rover 3500 P6B
- 1977 Holden Torana A9X hatchback
- 1977 Leyland Mini Moke
- 1978 Leyland Mini 1275 LS
- 1978 Leyland Mini panel van
- 1980 HDT Commodore Brock Group A
- 1980 Telecom Australia Phone Car
- 1982 Mitsubishi L300 people mover van
- 1983 Mitsubishi Magna sedan prototype
- 1983 Toyota Land Cruiser FJ45 wagon
- 1986 Holden Piazza Turbo coupe
- 1991 Holden Caprice
- 1996 Mitsubishi Verada wagon test mule
- 1998 Toyota Prius sedan
- 2000 Chevrolet Lumina sedan (based on Holden Commodore)
- 2000 Holden ECOmmodore sedan (VX) concept car
- 2000 Toyota WiLL Vi
- 2004 Pontiac GTO (based on Holden Monaro)
- 2008 Mitsubishi 380 Series III Premier sedan

The following is a non-exhaustive list of motorbikes display:

- 1904 Minerva
- 1910 Matchless
- 1918 Favourite
- 1920 Harley Davidson Sport Twin
- 1923 Matchless H-2 with side chair
- 1923 Waratah
- 1927 Indian Scout
- 1930 BSA S30
- 1936 Brough-Superior Model SS80
- 1948 Vincent Series B Rapide
- 1949 Velocette Mk8 KTT
- 1960 Mazda Three Wheeler
- 1964 Honda Monkey CZ100
- 1966 BMW R60/2
- 1969 Benelli 250cc racer
- 1972 Honda CB 750
- 1981 Kawasaki KLX250B
- 1983 KMZ Dnepr Custom Cruzer replica

== See also ==
- List of automobile museums
