= Ian Hannaford =

Australian rules footballer and architect (1940–2022)

Personal information
- Born: 6 March 1940; Riverton, South Australia
- Died: 10 March 2022 (aged 82)
- Height: 192 cm (6 ft 4 in)
- Weight: 92 kg (203 lb)
- Positions: Ruckman, forward

Playing career
Years	Club	Games (Goals)
1958–1964	Port Adelaide	123 (108)

Representative team honours
Years	Team	Games (Goals)
1958–1964	South Australia	17

Career highlights
- Club: 3x Port Adelaide premiership player (1958, 1962, 1963); Representative: 17 games for South Australia

Ian Geoffrey Hannaford (6 March 1940 – 10 March 2022) was an Australian rules footballer and architect.

== Early life ==
Ian Geoffrey Hannaford was born on 6 March 1940, to Claude and Vera (née Hoare). He was the eldest of four siblings, the other three being brothers Donald and artist Robert Hannaford, and sister, Kay. He grew up on his family's farm in the Gilbert Valley near Riverton, South Australia, and attended Prince Alfred College in Adelaide for his final two years of high school.

== Football ==
Hannaford played for the Port Adelaide Football Club in the SANFL, retiring at the young age of 24 in order to train as an architect. He was named by The Advertiser as among Port Adelaide's 150 greatest players in the club's first 150 years.

== Architecture ==
Hannaford was also an architect, who was responsible for the design of Rundle Mall in 1976, as well as private residences, some of them in modernist style inspired by Mies van der Rohe. He designed the Victor Richardson Gates at Adelaide Oval, as well as apartment buildings and resorts.

== Death ==
Hannaford died on 10 March 2022, four days after his 82nd birthday.
