= Ernest Hannaford =

Australian politician (1879–1955)

Ernest Hayler Hannaford (21 June 1879 – 21 December 1955) was an Australian farmer and politician who represented the South Australian House of Assembly multi-member seat of Murray from 1927 to 1930 for the Liberal Federation.

He was a bee-keeper on his father's farm and had 360 hives that produced 10 tons of honey a year.

In local politics, he was mayor of the Corporate Town of St Peters from 1926 to 1928 and from 1937 to 1942.

He was one of many notable descendants of Susannah Hannaford.
