= Tweed Regional Gallery =

Tweed Regional Gallery & Margaret Olley Art Centre
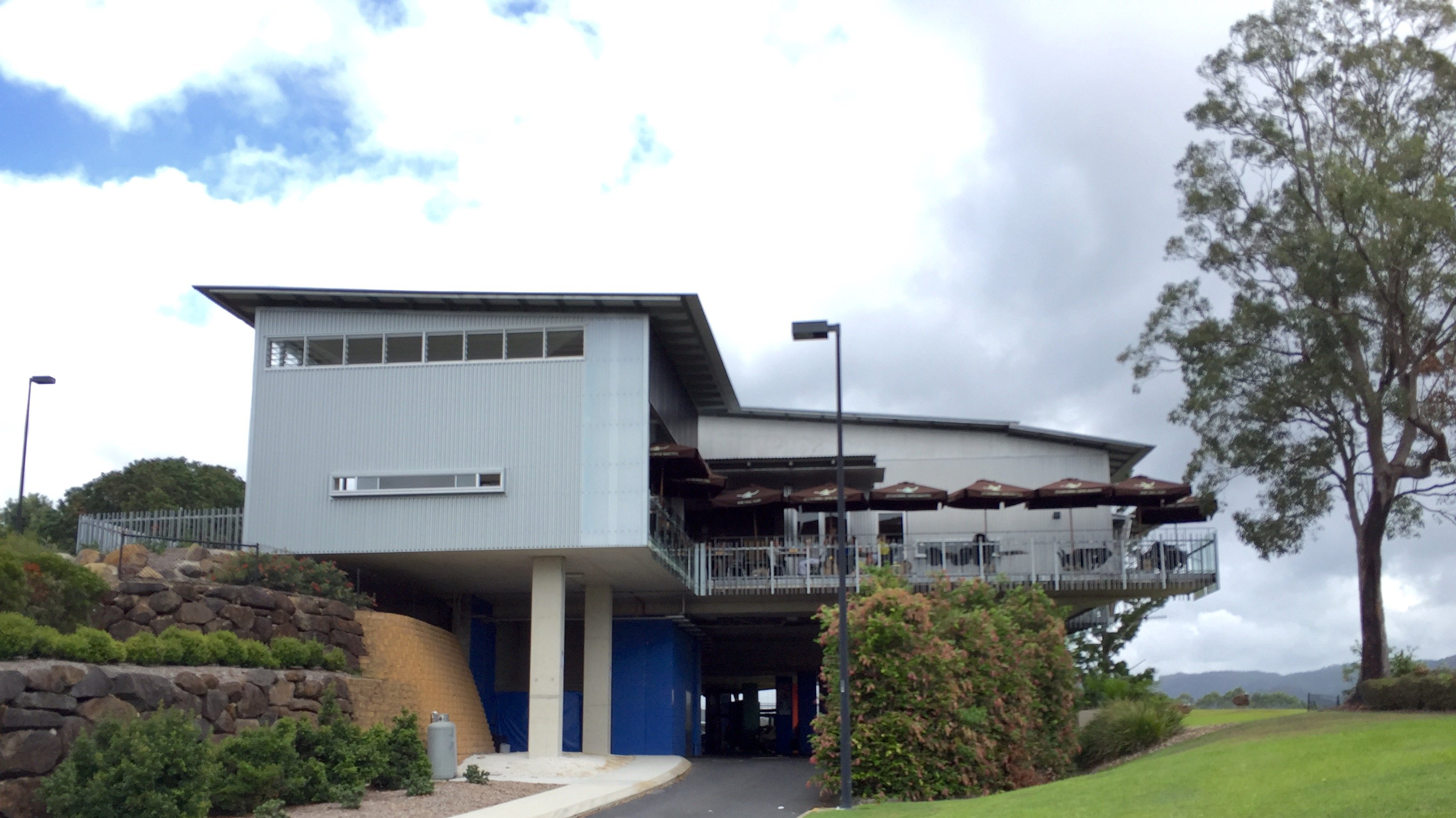

General information
- Coordinates: 28.348555°S 153.399968°E

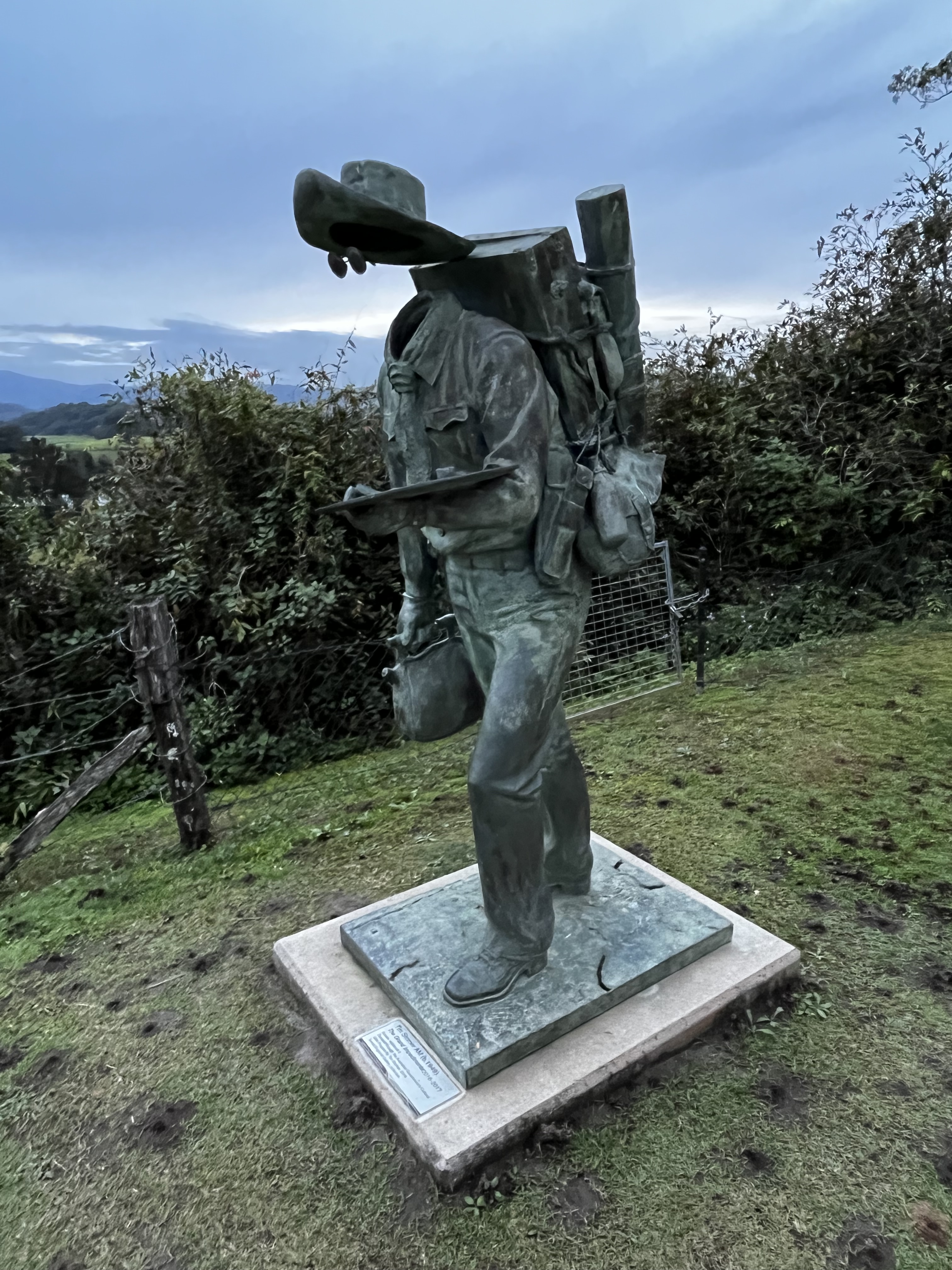
Statue on the grounds of the gallery, it is an artwork by Tim Storrier entitled 'The Grand Impedimenta', (2016–2017)

Tweed Regional Gallery & Margaret Olley Art Centre is a regional art gallery in Murwillumbah, New South Wales, Australia. Lonely Planet Australia describes it as "an exceptional gallery... home to some of Australia's finest in a variety of media."

In June 2009 the gallery featured in an episode of the ABC television program, Collectors.

On 15 March 2014 the gallery opened a new Margaret Olley Art Centre, named for Margaret Olley, which cost $4 million to construct. Funding included $1 million from the federal government's Community Infrastructure Grants Program. The new Centre houses the 76,000 objects from the studio of artist Margaret Olley, who died in 2011 aged 88.
