= Laurel (given name) =

Laurel is a unisex given name. The name is of English origin from the Latin Lauras, referring to the laurel tree. Various names related to Laurel are Laura, Lauren, Lori, and Lorraine. Another related name would be the Germanic mythology name Lorelie which means "luring rock" and is mentioned in a German legend saying that a maiden named Lorelei, who lives upon a rock in the Rhine River, lures fishermen to death with her songs.

Notable people and characters with the name include:

== People ==
- Laurel Abrahamson (born 1986), American volleyball player
- Laurel Aitken (1927–2005), Cuban-Jamaican singer
- Laurel Arnell-Cullen (born 1994), British indie musician
- Laurel Beckett (fl. 1960s–2010s), American biostatistician
- Laurel Braitman (born 1978), American science historian and writer
- Laurel Broten (born c. 1967), Canadian politician
- Laurel Burch (1945–2007), American artist, designer, and businesswoman
- Laurel Campbell (1902–1971), New Zealand racehorse trainer
- Laurel Casinader (1903–1986), Sri Lankan educationalist and philanthropist
- Laurel Chor (born 1990), Hong Kong photographer, journalist, and filmmaker
- Laurel Clark (1961–2003), American astronaut, medical doctor, navy captain, and Space Shuttle mission specialist
- Laurel Collins (born 1984), Canadian politician
- Laurel Coppock (born 1977), American comedic actress
- Laurel Cronin (1939–1992), American actress, singer, and dancer
- Laurel Crosby, Canadian schoolteacher and sports executive and administrator
- Laurel Currie Oates, American legal author and law professor
- Laurel Cutler (1926–2021), American advertising executive
- Laurel DeWitt, American fashion designer and artist
- Laurel E. Youmans (1863–1926), American politician and physician
- Laurel Edwards (born 1966), Australian television presenter, radio announcer, and singer
- Laurel Elizabeth Keyes (1907–1983), American writer, lecturer, and counselor
- Laurel Frank, Australian costume designer
- Laurel G. Bellows (fl. 1970s–2010s), American lawyer
- Laurel Goodwin (1942–2022), American film- and television actress
- Laurel Griggs (2006–2019), American child actress
- Laurel Haak, American scientist
- Laurel Halo (born 1985), American electronic musician
- Laurel Hausler (born 1977), American contemporary oil painter and sculptor
- Laurel H. Carney (born 1961), an American engineer and neuroscientist who conducts research on the auditory system.
- Laurel Hester (1956–2006), American police lieutenant
- Laurel Holloman, American painter and actress
- Laurel Hubbard (born 1978), New Zealand weightlifter
- Laurel Hurley (1927–2013), American soprano
- Laurel Ivory (born 1999), American NWSL goalkeeper
- Laurel J. Brinton (born 1953), American-born Canadian linguist
- Laurel J. Richie, American WNBA president
- Laurel Johannesson, Canadian artist
- Laurel Johnson (born 1967), Jamaican sprinter
- Laurel Johnson, American contestant on Survivor (American TV series)
- Laurel Kean (born 1963), American professional golfer
- Laurel Kessel (born 1954), American volleyball player
- Laurel Korholz (born 1970), American rower and coach
- Laurel L. Wilkening (1944–2019), American planetary scientist and professor
- Laurel Lee (disambiguation), several people
- Laurel Libby (born 1981), American activist, politician, and interior designer
- Laurel Lunt Prussing (born 1941), American politician
- Laurel Marsden (born 2001), American actress
- Laurel Martin (born 1969), American field hockey player
- Laurel Martyn (1916–2013), Australian ballerina
- Laurel Massé (born 1951), American jazz singer and past member of vocal group The Manhattan Transfer
- Laurel McAlister (1892–1981), New Zealand welfare worker and community leader
- Laurel McGoff (born 1995), American actress and participant on reality show Kid Nation
- Laurel McSherry, American artist and director
- Laurel Mellin (born 1949), American author
- Laurel Molk, American illustrator and author of children's books
- Laurel Nakadate (born 1975), American feminist video artist, filmmaker, and photographer
- Laurel Nannup (born 1943), Western Australian Noongar artist
- Laurel Neme, American consultant in environmental and wildlife policy and natural resource management
- Laurel O'Donnell, American author of romance novels
- Laurel Pardey (1897–1974), Australian pianist
- Laurel Parmet, American filmmaker
- Laurel Power (born 1953), Australian politician
- Laurel Powers-Freeling (born 1957), British businesswoman
- Laurel Ptak, American artist, curator, writer, and educator
- Laurel Rose Willson (1941–2002), American author and con artist
- Laurel Roth Hope (born 1973), American artist
- Laurel Schafer (fl. 1990s–2020s), Canadian organic chemist
- Laurel C. Schneider, American theologian and professor
- Laurel Snyder (born 1974), American poet and writer of children's books
- Laurel Stavis, American politician
- Laurel Thatcher Ulrich (born 1938), American historian and professor
- Laurel Touby (born 1963), American journalist and investor
- Laurel Trivelpiece (1926–1998), American poet and novelist
- Laurel True (born 1968), American artist, architectural artist, muralist, and mosaic artist
- Laurel van der Wal (1924–2009), American aeronautical engineer
- Laurel Vermillion, American educator and academic administrator
- Laurel Winter (born 1959), American author of fantasy, science fiction, and poetry
- Laurel Woodcock (1960–2017), Canadian artist and academic
- Laurel Yurchick (born 1974), birth name of Icy Blu, American recording artist
- Laurel Zuckerman (born 1960), American author

== Fictional characters ==
- Laurel, in the YA novel Wings (Aprilynne Pike)
- Laurel, in the children's picture book 10,000 Dresses
- Laurel Banning, in the US TV soap opera All My Children, played by Kristen Jensen and Felicity LaFortune
- Laurel Boyd, in the 1996 film Jerry Maguire (played by Bonny Hunt)
- Laurel Castillo, in the US TV series How to Get Away with Murder, played by Karla Souza
- Laurel Chapin, in the US soap opera One Life to Live, played by Janice Lynde
- Laurel Darkhaven, in the comic book series Rising Stars
- Laurel-Ann Drummond, in the horror film Pontypool, played by Georgina Reilly
- Laurel Duglose, the late biological mother of protagonist Randal Pearson in This Is Us
- Laurel Dupree, in the New Zealand soap opera Shortland Street, played by Andrea Kelland
- Laurel Gand, a.k.a. Andromeda, superheroine in DC Comics
- Laurel Gray, in the novel and film adaptation In a Lonely Place, played by Gloria Grahame
- Laurel Hitchin, in the US crime drama TV series The Blacklist, played by Christine Lahti
- Laurel Kent, superheroine in DC Comics
- Laurel Lance, a.k.a. Black Canary, superheroine in DC Comics
  - Laurel Lance (Arrowverse), in the TV series Arrow who was adapted from Laurel Lance
- Laurel Limoges, in the US TV series Privileged (TV series), played by Anne Archer
- Laurel Scott, in the film The Oscar, played by Jill St. John
- Laurel Sommersby, in the 1993 film Sommersby (played by Jodie Foster)
- Laurel Stevenson, in the novella/TV movie The Langoliers
- Laurel Takashima, in the 1993 film Babylon 5: The Gathering, played by Tamlyn Tomita
- Laurel Thomas, in the British soap opera Emmerdale, played by Charlotte Bellamy
- Laurel Victor, a character in Rick Riordan's Percy Jackson & the Olympians and The Trials of Apollo
- Laurel Weaver/Agent L., in the film Men in Black, played by Linda Fiorentino
- Laurel Yeung, in the Canadian TV series Edgemont (TV series), played by Kristin Kreuk

== See also ==
- Laurel (surname)
