= Vladas Meškėnas =

Lithuanian Australian artist (1916–2020)

Vladimir Meškėnas
- Born: 17 February 1916; Baku, Russian Empire (now Azerbaijan)
- Died: 2020 (aged 103–104); Sydney, Australia
- Occupation: portrait painter

Vladimir Meškėnas (17 February 1916 – 2020) was an Australian expressionist painter and portraitist in oil and pastel, who has been a frequent Archibald Prize finalist.

== Biography ==
Meskenas was born in February 1916 in Baku, the capital of Azerbaijan in the Caucasus where his father Juozas had sought refuge during World War I. In 1921, the family returned to their native Lithuania where Vladimir's father obtained work in the Transport Department.

In 1934, Vladimir left high school and enlisted in the Lithuanian Air Force, however he decided later to pursue an artistic career, and he became a freelance artist. When the Germans invaded Lithuania during World War II he and his wife were forced to work in Germany.

As displaced people, Meskenas and his family migrated to Australia in 1949. After a two-year work contract at the Victoria Army Barracks, Sydney, he worked at various factory jobs.

It was asserted in a 1979 issue of Lituanus, a Lithuanian Quarterly Journal of Arts and Sciences, that he "and all Lithuanian artists of Sydney" at the time were members of "Aitvaras", established in 1950. This included Jurgis Bistrickas (president), Henry Salkauskas (vice-president), Algis Simkunas, Jurgis Miksevicius, Juozas Kalgovas, Vincas Stanevicius, Petras Repsys, Viktoras Simas and Vaclovas Ratas.

== Career and awards ==
Although Meskenas had no formal training, his pencil drawing, Mother's Sorrow, 1941 gained an award in Lithuania for the best depiction of the atrocities of the Soviet occupation of Lithuania.

One of Meskenas's earliest portraits in Australia was Family Portrait, 1953, which won First Prize at the Australia-wide Art Exhibition at Mark Foy's Gallery in Sydney.

Meskenas's 1961 portrait of fellow artist Weaver Hawkins was a finalist in the 1961 Archibald Prize contest, and a 1963 portrait of Hawkins and his wife was entered for the 1963 Sulman Prize. This same portrait, Resting Couple, won the Helena Rubinstein portrait prize in 1963 and was described by critic Alan McCulloch as "the best portrait study in the competition, a careful and well integrated painting".

In 1976 Meskenas received the Sir Charles Lloyd Jones Prize at the Royal Easter Show in Sydney for his portrait of Donald Grant.

His portrait Donald Friend 1989 won the Archibald's People's Choice Award in 1989. His portrait of Dr Victor Chang was a finalist in the 1991/92 Archibald, as was his 1993 portrait of Professor Fred Hollows.

Meskenas painted many of his fellow-artists including Weaver Hawkins, William Dobell, Russell Drysdale, Lloyd Rees, Elwyn Lynn, John Olsen, Donald Friend, Adomas Varn and Michael Kmit.

In 1993 he successfully sued for libel Edmund Capon, director of the Art Gallery of New South Wales, for calling his portrait of businessman Rene Rivkin "... a rotten picture ... no good at all ...".

He was a finalist for the Doug Moran National Portrait Prize in 1990 for his portrait Donald Friend, and in 1992 for David Foster O.A.M..

In 2006 Meskenas received damages for infringement of moral rights when his portrait of Victor Chang was falsely attributed to someone else in the magazine Woman's Day.

== Represented ==
His portrait Sir Lorimer Fenton Dods (1964) is held by the Westmead Children's Hospital, Desiderius Orban (1986) by the State Library of New South Wales, and Max Schubert (1993) by Southcorp Wines. Other works are represented at the Art Gallery of New South Wales and in private collections in Australia, Lithuania, Germany and USA.

== Sources ==
- McCulloch, Alan Encyclopedia of Australian Art Hutchinson of London 1968
