= Āboliņš =

Origin
- Origin: Latvian
- Meaning: "clover", "trefoil"

Āboliņš (Old orthography: Ahbolin; feminine: Āboliņa) is a Latvian surname, derived from the Latvian word for "clover" and "trefoil". Individuals with the surname include:

- Artūrs Āboliņš, Latvian long jumper who reached 8.11 m in 2006 - see Long jump
- Gundars Āboliņš (born 1960), Latvian actor
- Uldis Abolins (1923–2010), Latvian-Australian painter, member of Six Directions
- Valters Āboliņš (born 1985), Latvian orienteer

== See also ==
- Nora Abolins or Nora Silvija Āboliņa (born 1992), Canadian football goalkeeper
