= Neme =

Neme may refer to:

- Nimis, or Neme, a town and commune in Udine, Italy
- Néme, or Nima, a village in Mintiu Gherlii Commune, Cluj County, Romania
- Neme language, a Nambu language of Papua New Guinea
- Laurel Neme, American environmentalist
