= Bronze votive figure from Pizzidimonte =

Etruscan bronze from 500–480 BC

Bronze Votive Figure from Pizzidimonte
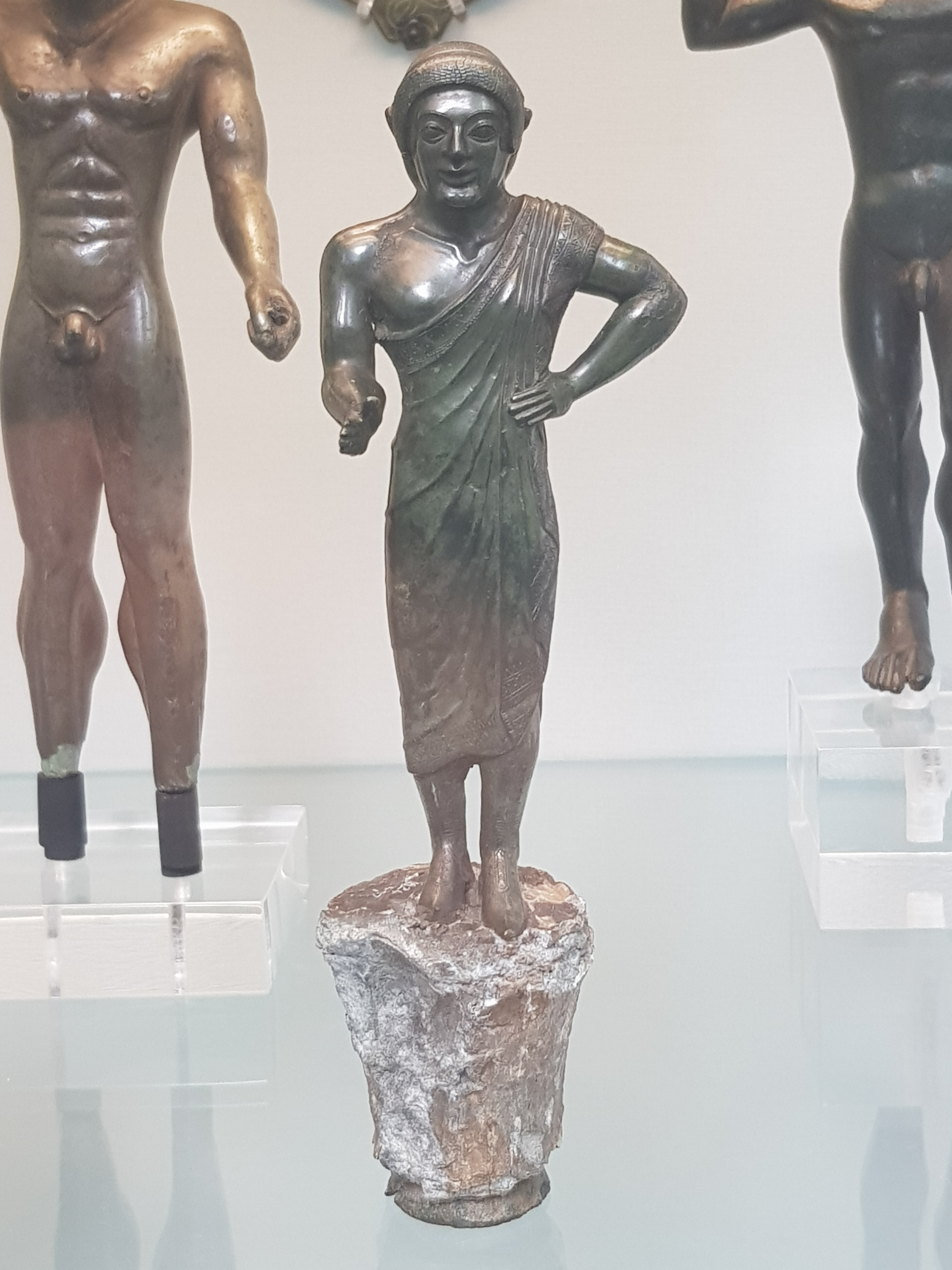
- The Pizzidimonte figure on display in the British Museum
- Material: Bronze
- Size: Height: 23.20 centimetres Width: 7.20 centimetres Depth: 8 centimetres
- Created: 500-480 BC
- Discovered: Before 1735
- Present location: British Museum, London
- Registration: 1824,0497.1

The Bronze Votive Figure from Pizzidimonte is an ancient bronze sculpture that was originally found near the town of Prato in Tuscany, northern Italy and is now part of the British Museum's collection. Considered one of the most beautiful Etruscan bronzes to survive to the present day, its style shows influence from the Greek cities of Asia Minor and Athens, though the dress, proportions and character are Etruscan.

== Provenance ==
The figure was known to be in the possession of Giuseppe Bianchini of Prato in 1735, together with other bronze deity figures which were said to have been found at Pizzidimonte near Prato. Though nothing is known about the exact findspot of the bronze figurine, the important Etruscan settlement at Gonfienti was discovered in 1996 only one kilometre away from Pizzidimonte and it is therefore likely that it was originally found there. The figure was later acquired by the collector Richard Payne Knight, who bequeathed it to the British Museum in 1824.

Fontanelli described this extraordinary object in the following way: “Together with many bronze statuettes of the Penates and Lares gods there was excavated a most elegant figurine, likewise of bronze, done with wonderful craftsmanship, which undoubtedly could not be surpassed. From this find, one can deduce that in ancient times, there stood in that place a temple dedicated by the Etruscans to their Penates.”

== Description ==
This bronze votive statuette shows a young man wearing a bordered tunic with pointed boots. The figure is still fixed to its original lead mount. The small sculpture stands upright with drapery closely wrapped around his body, right hand extended forward with the left hand placed firmly on his waist. The young man is portrayed beardless and his hair is rolled up on the neck behind. He has a trace of the ‘archaic smile’ familiar from earlier Greek sculpture.

== Gallery ==
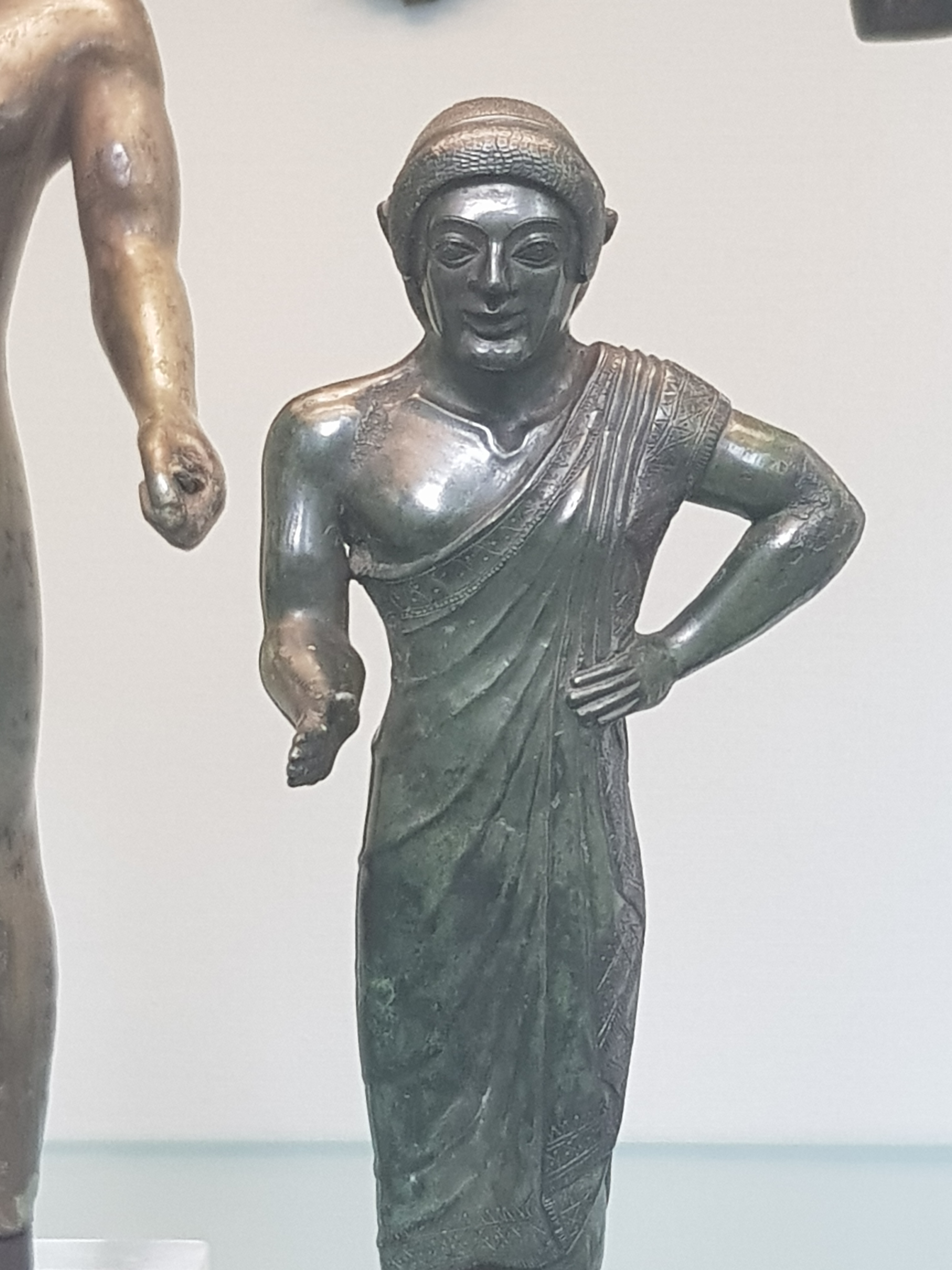
Detail of the bronze figurine
