= Laugel =

Laugel is a surname. Notable people with the surname include:

- Anselme Laugel (1851–1928), French-Alsatian author and politician
- Auguste Laugel (1830–1914), French historian and engineer
- Jonathan Laugel (born 1993), French rugby sevens player

== See also ==
- Laurel (surname)
