= Jim Motavalli =

American journalist

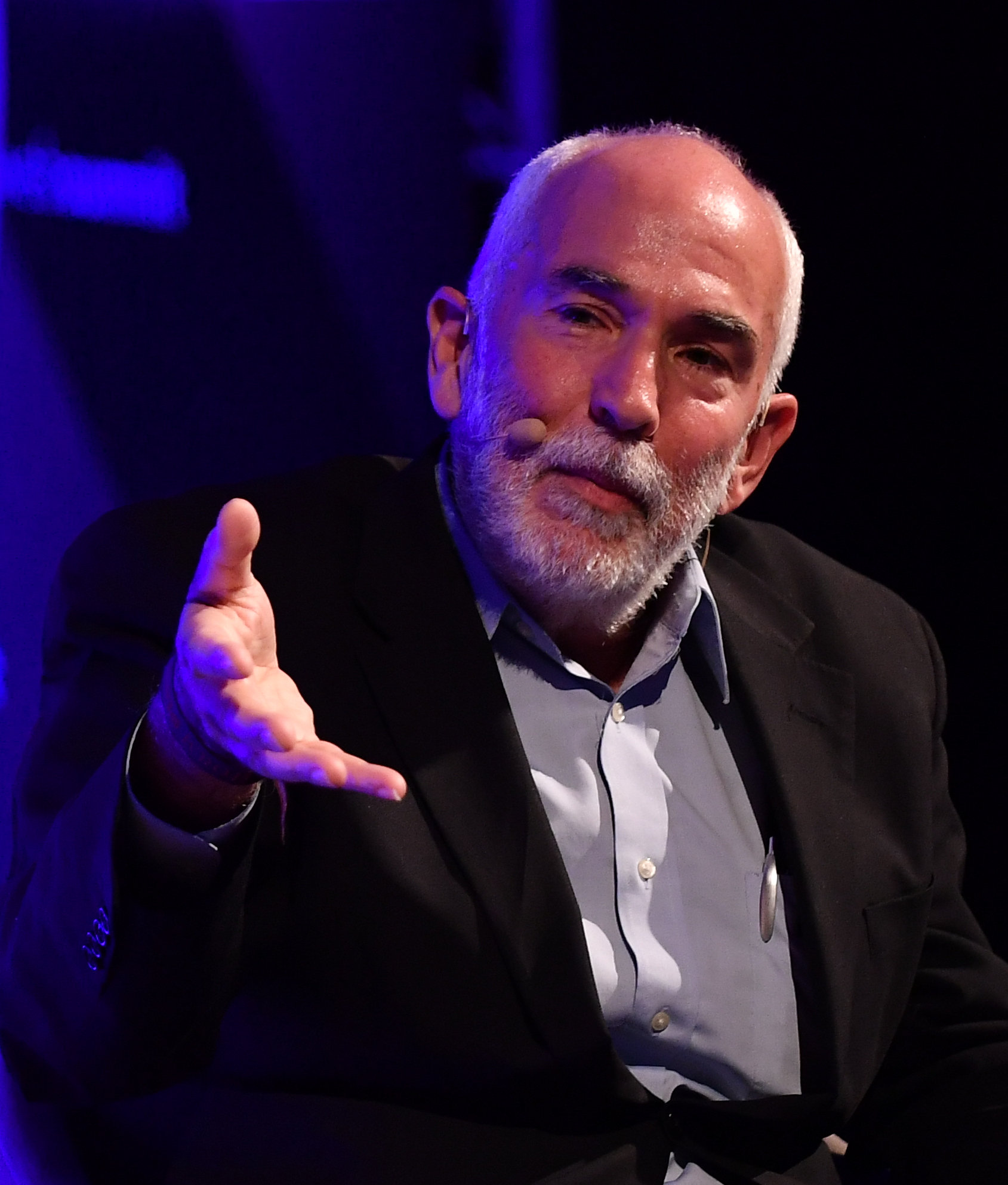
- Motavalli at Web Summit 2017
- Born: 1952 (age 73–74)
- Occupations: Author; journalist

Jim Motavalli (born 1952) is a journalist, author, and speaker who specializes in environmental issues, particularly green cars, climate, transportation, and various aspects of sustainable energy.

He writes for E–The Environmental Magazine as a senior writer, The New York Times as a blogger and columnist, and for various other publications including TheDailyGreen, NPR, and Mother Nature Network.

== Biography ==
After serving as its editor for 14 years, Motavalli became a senior writer for E–The Environmental Magazine, a bi-monthly publication which aims to bring attention to environmental problems. He currently writes and blogs for The New York Times as a member of its "Automobiles" section and has a syndicated column called "Wheels", hosts a show on WPKN, and speaks often on National Public Radio's (NPR) Car Talks program.

He also contributes to Environmental Defense Fund, TheDailyGreen, and Mother Nature Network works, and he has twice won the Global Media Award from the Population Institute.

Motavalli has authored four books – Naked in the Woods: Joseph Knowles and the Legacy of Frontier Fakery, Forward Drive: The Race to Build "Clean Cars" for the Future, and Feeling the Heat: Dispatches from the Frontlines of Climate Change – and edited three others. He previously served as a professor of journalism at Fairfield University and the University of Connecticut; the latter is his alma mater.

He lives in Connecticut.

== Works ==
=== Forward Drive ===
Forward Drive: The Race to Build the Clean Car of the Future is a 2001 publication that explores the interlinking history of sustainable energy and the automobile industry. It analyzes modern dependency upon oil.

=== Feeling the Heat ===
Feeling the Heat: Dispatches from the Frontlines of Climate Change was published in 2004; it tracks the phenomenon of global warming and its effects on the environment and in communities.

=== Naked in the Woods ===
Naked in the Woods: Joseph Knowles and the Legacy of Frontier Fakery, published in January 2008, is a biography that follows the sensation surrounding Joseph Knowles and his alleged survival in nature alone without resources. Knowles was later debunked for having stayed in a log cabin with food for two months.

=== High Voltage ===
High Voltage: The Fast Track to Plug In the Auto Industry was published in November 2011 and examines the market competition for electric cars as well as the changes in the automobile industry.
