= The Print Circle =

The Print Circle is a professional group of women printmakers that operate out of Sydney, New South Wales. The group was created in 1970 by 15 women artists who took pioneering and experimental approaches to printmaking and supported women artists. The group first worked out of Willoughby Arts Centre (then the North Shore Arts Centre) set up by Joy Ewart who included lithographic and etching presses in the centre. Sue Buckley became the first printmaking tutor and was a member of Sydney Printmakers. In 1971 the first Print Circle exhibition was held at Sebert Galleries in the Argyle Centre, Sydney. The Print Circle promotes the work of women artists, similar to the Tin Sheds workshop at University of Sydney.

In 1994 the Print Circle held an exhibition titled "Beyond the Word", which examined the symbolic influence of words.

== Membership ==
As of March 2024, artists who are part of the Print Circle include Lorraine Avery, Helen Best, Jean Birrell, Janet Carter, Olwen Cheung, Edith Cowlishaw, Prue Crabbe, Tanya Crothers, Barbara Davidson, Joanne Gwatkin-Williams, Debra Hannigan, Jill Harris, Carolyn Hunter, Wendy Morrison, Carol Shaw, Judy Smith, Laura Stark, Anna Warren, Deborah Wilkinson, Naomi Woodlands, and Ann Bewah Wu.
