= Interpump Group =

Italian industrial machinery company

Interpump Group S.p.A.
- Type: Società per azioni; Public company
- Traded as: BIT: IP
- ISIN: IT0001078911
- Industry: Industrial machinery; Hydraulics; Water-jetting; Fluid power
- Founded: 1977; 49 years ago
- Founder: Fulvio Montipò
- Headquarters: Via Enrico Fermi 25, Sant'Ilario d'Enza, Italy
- Area served: Worldwide
- Key people: Fulvio Montipò (Chairman with delegated powers); Fabio Marasi (CEO); Giovanni Tamburi (Deputy chairman)
- Products: High-pressure and ultra-high-pressure plunger pumps; Water-jetting systems; Power take-offs; Hydraulic pumps, cylinders and valves; Hoses, pipes and fittings; Flow-processing equipment; Reduction gears and transmission components
- Revenue: €2.0707 billion (2025)
- Operating income: €336.6 million (2025)
- Net income: €209.7 million (2025)
- Number of employees: over 9,000 average employees
- Website: www.interpumpgroup.it

Interpump Group S.p.A. is an Italian industrial machinery company headquartered in Sant'Ilario d'Enza, in the province of Reggio Emilia, Italy. Founded in 1977 by Fulvio Montipò, the company manufactures high-pressure and ultra-high-pressure plunger pumps, water-jetting systems and a broad range of hydraulic, fluid-conveyance and power-transmission components. Interpump describes itself as the world's leading manufacturer of professional high-pressure piston pumps and one of the major global players in the hydraulics sector.

Interpump Group is listed on Borsa Italiana under the ticker symbol IP and ISIN IT0001078911. The shares trade on Euronext STAR Milan and are included in indices including the FTSE Italia All-Share, FTSE Italia Mid Cap and FTSE Italia STAR. As of the Borsa Italiana company profile updated on 8 June 2026, net sales were divided between hydraulic components, at 65.4%, and high-pressure pumps and pistons, at 34.6%; geographically, sales were distributed across Italy, the rest of Europe, North America, the Far East and Oceania, and other regions.

== History ==
=== Foundation and high-pressure pumps ===
Interpump Group was founded in 1977 in Sant'Ilario d'Enza by Fulvio Montipò. The first company of the group was built around a technical innovation in high-pressure piston pumps: replacing steel pistons with ceramic pistons. According to the company, the change improved the efficiency, performance and reliability of the pumps and helped the group become world market leader within a few years. Forbes has described Montipò as the son of a mason from Baiso who built Interpump by applying ceramic piston technology to industrial pumps.

During its early decades, Interpump expanded its range of high-pressure plunger pumps and related accessories. The acquisition of Pratissoli Pompe in the early 1990s broadened the water-jetting product range to heavy-duty triplex piston pumps for sectors such as steel, chemicals, petrochemicals, construction and water treatment. In 1998, the group acquired General Pump in the United States, strengthening its distribution of high-pressure piston pumps, accessories and spare parts in North America.

=== Listing and move into hydraulics ===
Interpump Group was listed on the Milan Stock Exchange in 1996. Around the same period, the company began a strategic shift into hydraulics. According to the company's history, the turning point came in the late 1990s, when the group entered hydraulics and became, within two years, the world's largest manufacturer of power take-offs.

In the second half of the 1990s, Montipò sold the company to the private equity firm BC Partners and then later bought back a large stake, returning to a leading shareholder and managerial role. In 2009, IPG Holding, associated with Montipò-family interests and Italian investor groups, took part in a capital increase that reinforced the shareholder structure of the listed group.

=== Repositioning and international acquisitions ===
In 2005, Interpump acquired the German company Hammelmann, active in very-high-pressure systems, and sold its professional cleaning machines business as part of a strategic repositioning toward higher-technology sectors. In 2007, the group further strengthened its water-jetting business with the acquisition of NLB Corporation, a US manufacturer and renter of high-pressure water-jetting machines mounted on trailers.

From the 2010s onward, Interpump expanded through a series of acquisitions in water-jetting, flow processing, hydraulics, fluid conveyance and power transmission. It acquired IMM Hydraulics in 2013, adding hydraulic rubber hoses and fittings; acquired companies including Tubiflex and Tekno Tubi in 2016; and in 2017 acquired the international operations of Finland-based GS-Hydro, a specialist in piping systems for oil and gas, industrial and naval applications using non-welded flange technology.

The group also expanded into flow-processing equipment for food, cosmetics and pharmaceuticals. In 2015, it acquired Bertoli, an Italian company specialising in high-pressure homogenisers. In 2017, Spanish company Inoxpa and Italian company Mariotti & Pecini joined the group, expanding the range to valves, tanks, rotary lobe pumps, mixers and agitators. In 2020, Interpump acquired companies including Servizi Industriali, specialised in separation and clarification systems; in 2023 it added I.Mec, a manufacturer of mechanical screens, and Waikato, a New Zealand manufacturer of automated milking systems.

In hydraulics, the group expanded in valves and directional control valves through acquisitions such as Galtech and Hydrocontrol in 2012 and 2013, and Walvoil in 2014. The 2021 acquisition of White Drive Motors & Steering expanded the product range to orbital motors and steering systems, while acquisitions such as Eurofluid and Mouldtech strengthened supply of hydraulic manifold blocks and castings.

In power transmission, Interpump entered reduction gears in 2019 by acquiring Reggiana Riduttori, followed by Transtecno. Later acquisitions included DZ Trasmissioni, Berma and Draintech, expanding into right-angle gear drivers, screw jacks and chain-floor transmission. In 2025, Interpump, through Reggiana Riduttori, acquired 70% of Borghi Assali, a Bomporto-based company specialising in hydraulic and electric steering axles for industrial vehicles.

== Business areas ==
Interpump Group organises its operations around Water-Jetting and Hydraulics, with activities that include piston pumps, flow processing, power take-offs, hydraulic cylinders, valves and directional control valves, hoses, pipes and fittings, reduction gears and other hydraulic components.

=== Water-Jetting ===
The Water-Jetting sector includes the group's historic core business: plunger pumps with power ranging from 1 to 2,000 hp, equivalent to approximately 0.7 to 1,500 kW, together with components and accessories. Interpump says the use of ceramic pistons became a technological reference standard in professional high-pressure pumps. The Pratissoli Pompe range includes heavy-duty triplex pumps with more than 60 models, flow rates exceeding 2,600 litres per minute, pressure up to 1,600 bar and power up to 1,200 hp.

The division was expanded through Hammelmann, which Interpump describes as a global leader in ultra-high-pressure fluid pumping technology up to 4,000 bar, and NLB Corporation, which manufactures and rents high-pressure water-jetting equipment in the 140 to 2,800 bar range. Other companies and brands associated with Water-Jetting include Interpump, Pratissoli Pompe, General Pump, Hammelmann, NLB Corporation and Inoxihp.

=== Flow Processing ===
The Flow Processing activities were developed as a natural extension of piston-pump technology into industrial processes where pumps are a production component. The first step was the acquisition of Bertoli in 2015, followed by Inoxpa and Mariotti & Pecini in 2017 and by subsequent additions such as Servizi Industriali, I.Mec and Waikato. Products include high-pressure homogenisers, valves, tanks, mixers, agitators, rotary lobe pumps, mechanical screens and automated milking systems for sectors including food, cosmetics, pharmaceuticals and agriculture.

=== Hydraulics ===
Interpump's Hydraulics sector developed from 1997 and includes a broad range of mobile and industrial hydraulic components. Products include power take-offs, hydraulic pumps, cylinders, valves, directional control valves, hoses, pipes, fittings, hydraulic tanks, power packs, steering systems and reduction gears.

Power take-offs are mechanical components used to transfer torque from a vehicle engine or transmission to equipment mounted on the vehicle frame, such as refuse collection equipment, firefighting systems and cranes. Interpump's leadership in PTOs was built through companies such as Hydrocar, PZB and Muncie Power Products. The group first entered hydraulic cylinders in 2008 through acquisitions including Contarini, Modenflex, Cover, Panni Oleodinamica and HS Penta, and later strengthened the segment with Hydra Dyne Tech in 2019.

The valves and directional control valves business includes products such as DCVs, hydraulic pumps and motors, compact hydraulics, electronics, orbital motors and electro-hydraulic steering systems, with Walvoil as one of the key companies in the segment. The hoses, pipes and fittings business includes IMM Hydraulics, Tubiflex, Tekno Tubi and GS-Hydro, while the reduction gears business includes Reggiana Riduttori, Transtecno, DZ Trasmissioni, Berma, Draintech and Borghi Assali.

== Major subsidiaries and brands ==
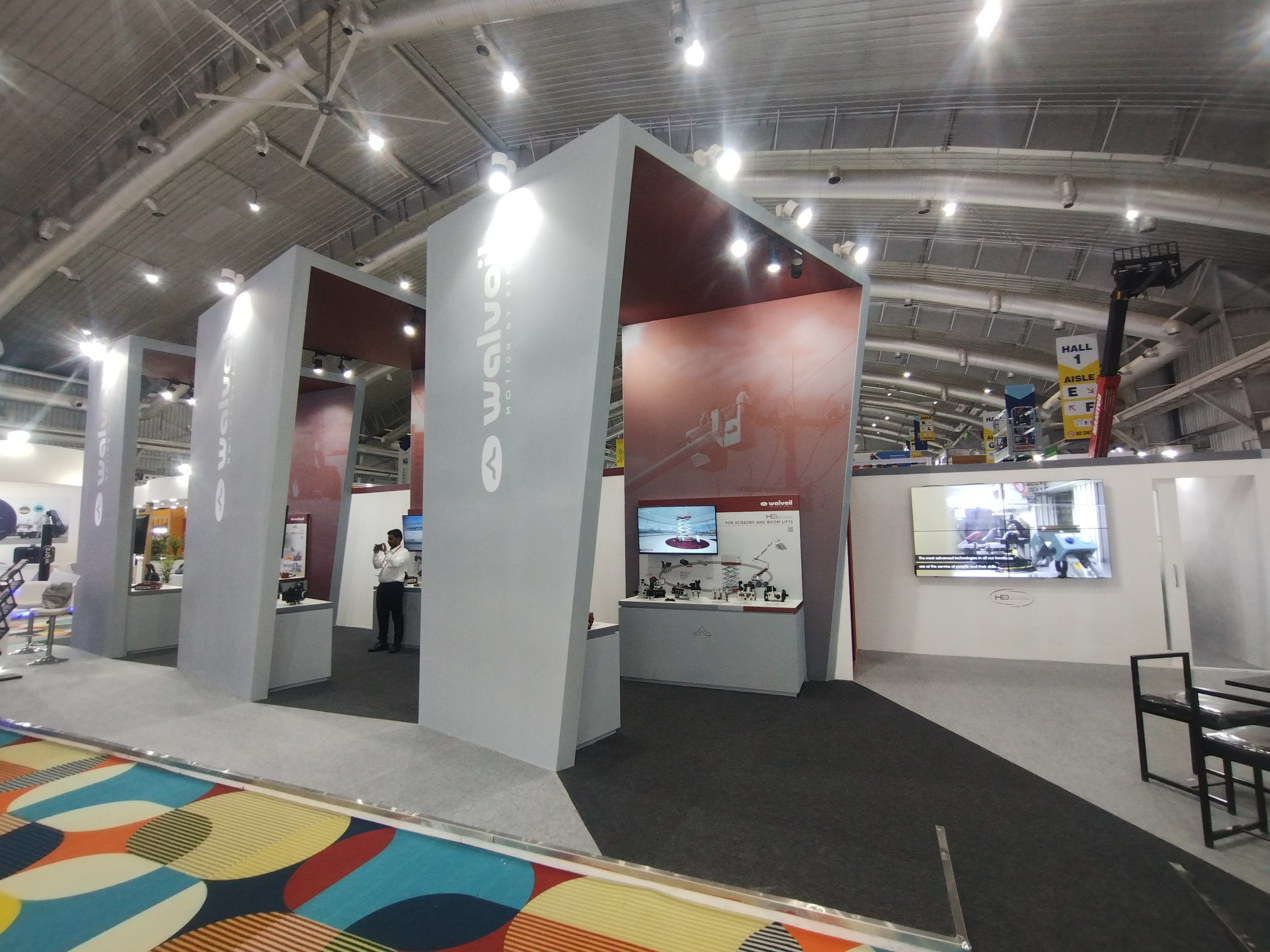
Walvoil at EXCON 2025, BIEC.

The group includes more than 100 companies and brands across 36 countries. Major operating companies and brands include:

Selected companies and brands
Area	Companies and brands
Water-Jetting	Interpump, Pratissoli Pompe, General Pump, Hammelmann, NLB Corporation, Inoxihp
Flow Processing	Bertoli, Inoxpa, Mariotti & Pecini, Servizi Industriali, I.Mec, Waikato
Power take-offs and hydraulic systems	Interpump Hydraulics, Hydrocar, PZB, Muncie Power Products, Hydroven, American Mobile Power
Valves and directional control valves	Walvoil, Galtech, Hydrocontrol, White Drive Motors & Steering, Eurofluid, Mouldtech
Cylinders	Contarini, Modenflex, HS Penta, Panni Oleodinamica, Cover, Hydra Dyne Tech
Hoses, pipes and fittings	IMM Hydraulics, Tubiflex, Tekno Tubi, GS-Hydro
Power transmission	Reggiana Riduttori, Transtecno, DZ Trasmissioni, Berma, Draintech, Borghi Assali

== International presence ==
Interpump Group has a manufacturing and commercial presence across Europe, North America, Latin America, Asia, Africa and Oceania. The company's global profile states that it comprises more than 100 companies, operates in 36 countries and has an average workforce of more than 9,000 employees. Earlier versions of the company's public profiles and encyclopedic articles listed operations in countries including Canada, the United States, Brazil, Chile, Italy, France, Spain, the United Kingdom, Germany, Romania, Bulgaria, South Africa, the United Arab Emirates, China, India, South Korea, Australia and New Zealand.

== Governance and shareholders ==
Interpump Group's board of directors is chaired by Fulvio Montipò, who holds delegated powers. Giovanni Tamburi is deputy chairman and Fabio Marasi is chief executive officer. Other board members listed by the company include Elena Iotti, Nicolò Dubini, Federica Menichetti, Roberta Pierantoni, Rita Rolli and Annachiara Svelto, most of whom are independent directors.

According to the Borsa Italiana company profile updated on 8 June 2026, the main shareholders were Gruppo IPG Holding S.r.l. with 23.42%, Capital Research and Management Company with 8.69%, Fidelity Management & Research Company LLC with 4.59% and Reggiana Finanziaria S.r.l. with 3.49%. Treasury shares represented 1.75% of the share capital. Gruppo IPG Holding has historically been associated with the Montipò family and Tamburi Investment Partners.

== Financials ==
In the 2025 financial year, Interpump Group reported revenues of €2.0707 billion, EBITDA of €462.0 million, EBIT of €336.6 million and consolidated net profit of €209.7 million. Net financial position at the end of the year was €291.1 million.

Consolidated results
Year	Net sales	Operating income	Net income
2025	€2,070.684 million	€336.564 million	€209.709 million
2024	€2,078.399 million	€337.814 million	€228.470 million
2023	€2,240.039 million	€428.819 million	€277.516 million
2022	€2,077.964 million	€384.004 million	€269.749 million
2021	€1,604.255 million	€295.048 million	€198.519 million

In 2025, the Hydraulics division generated €1.3550 billion in revenue, while the Water-Jetting division generated €715.7 million.

Revenue by division in 2025
Division	Revenue	Change from 2024
Hydraulics	€1.3550 billion	−3.7%
Water-Jetting	€715.7 million	+6.7%

For the first quarter of 2026, Interpump Group reported revenues of €524.8 million, an increase of 0.6% compared with the first quarter of 2025, EBITDA of €114.7 million and net profit of €57.5 million. Net financial position at 31 March 2026 was €294.6 million.

== Sustainability ==
Interpump Group has published ESG plans and sustainability reporting through its investor and sustainability pages. Its 2023–2025 ESG plan included targets such as reducing group carbon intensity and increasing the share of renewable electricity consumption. In June 2026, the board approved an ESG Plan for 2026–2028 identifying actions across environmental, social and governance pillars.

== See also ==
- Hydraulics
- Hydraulic machinery
- Pump
- Water jet cutter
- Fluid power
- Borsa Italiana
