= Lauralee =

Lauralee is a given name. Notable people with the name include:

- Lauralee Bell (born 1968), American soap opera actress
- Lauralee Martin (born 1951), American businesswoman
- Lauralee Martinovich, 1997 New Zealand Miss World contestant

== See also ==
- Laura Lee (disambiguation)
- Laura Leigh (disambiguation)
- Laura (given name)
