= Weaver Hawkins =

English painter

- Born: Harold Frederick Weaver Hawkins; 28 August 1893; Sydenham, London
- Died: 13 August 1977 (aged 83); Willoughby, Australia
- Known for: Painting
- Notable work: Morning Underground, Persecution, The Two Minute Silence

Harold Frederick Weaver Hawkins (1893–1977) was an English painter and printmaker working with the techniques of etching, monotypes, linocuts and woodcuts. He specialized in "ambitious, sometimes mural-sized, modernist allegories of morality for an age of atomic warfare and global over-population." He was active from 1923 to 1972.

== Personal life ==
Weaver Hawkins was born on 28 August 1893 in Sydenham, an area of London, England. He was the eldest of five sons of architect Edgar Augustine Hawkins and his wife Annie Elizabeth, née Weaver.

Weaver Hawkins attended Dulwich College from 1906 to 1910, and then Camberwell School of Arts and Crafts. World War I derailed his intention to become an art teacher.

Weaver Hawkins enlisted in the Queen's Westminster Rifles and was seriously wounded in the Battle of the Somme at Gommecourt, France in 1916. As a result of his injuries his right hand and arm were rendered useless but were saved from amputation after countless operations. His father had declared to the operating surgeon "My son is an artist. He would rather die than live without arms.". Initially right-handed, Weaver Hawkins had to teach himself to draw and paint using his left arm, which was never at full strength. There are references to him painting with a paintbrush in his mouth, but he seemed to have resolved working with his left hand, supported by his damaged right arm.

In 1923, he married Irene (Rene) Eleanor Villiers, another artist. They had a daughter and two sons. Weaver Hawkins settled his family in Australia in 1935.

In 1927, to avoid public and media perceptions of being identified as a 'wounded artist' rather than an artist in his own right, Weaver began signing his paintings with the art-name 'Raokin,’ (the Italian phonetic pronunciation of 'Mr. Hawkins,') although he later became more popularly known as Weaver Hawkins.

The Hawkins were regarded as bohemian, dressed informally and it was noted that "Mr Hawkins had not worn shoes for years... He designs and makes his own sandals".

In 1963 Vladas Meskenas won the Helena Rubinstein portrait prize for a double portrait of Weaver and his wife.

Hawkins was interviewed twice about his early life and career as an artist. The first was in 1965 by Hazel de Berg, and the second was in 1973 by Denise Hickey. Both recordings can be found at the National Library of Australia.

He died on 13 August 1977 in the Sydney suburb of Willoughby, Australia.

== Art career ==
After World War I, Weaver Hawkins studied at the Westminster Technical Institute and School of Art from 1919 to 1922, and took classes in etching from Sir Frank Short.

His first solo exhibit was held in 1923, and his work was displayed in the Royal Academy of Arts. He also exhibited at the New English Art Club and the Goupil Salon.

From 1923 until 1935 Weaver Hawkins and his wife and three children traveled widely. They spent time in St Tropez in France, Spain, Italy, Malta, lived "native style on a remote Tahitian island" and visited New Zealand before finally settling in 1935. He chose the northern Sydney coastal suburb of Mona Vale, Australia and he named his home Maui Ma after his experience of living in Tahiti. The house was located at the Pittwater end of Waterview Street, named The Mad Half Mile by Sydney Ure Smith where artists, poets and writers lived. Neighbours included artists Arthur Murch, and Rah Fizelle, poet John Thompson, American artist Raymond Glass, watercolourist Frank MacNamara, sculptor Paul Beadle, and the Mercury Theatre producer John Wiltshire. As a result, Weaver Hawkins became involved in a wider arts circle in Sydney, including meeting actor Peter Finch in a production of Moliere's Imaginary Invalid for which he had designed "aptly picturesque costumes".

Weaver Hawkins was a member of various art societies. He was a founding member and a president of the Contemporary Art Society, a member of the first council of the National Gallery Society of NSW in 1953, and in the early 1960s, a founding member with Henry Salkauskas, of the Sydney Printmakers group, the first society of printmakers established after the end of the etching boom in the late 1930s when printmaking experienced a lull in Sydney for more than two decades.

== Exhibitions ==
.From 1941 and 1972 Weaver Hawkins had several exhibitions in Australia, especially with the Contemporary Art Society of Australia and the Sydney Printmakers. He was given several solo exhibitions at the Macquarie Galleries and the Eva Breuer gallery.

In 1943, his landscape painting In Mona Vale was a finalist in that year's Wynne Prize and One of a Generation was a finalist in the Archibald Prize.

In 1952, 1953 and 1960, his works were selected for the Sulman Prize at the Art Gallery of New South Wales. His 1952 work Man attracted a lot of interest, depicting "a shackled man carrying a locked cage containing a human brain with protruding eyes attached". His 1960 entry was described by the art critic for The Bulletin as "a frightening mass of orange drain pipes."

Weaver Hawkin's selected entry Betrayal for the 1952 Blake Prize was reviewed in the Catholic Weekly and he was critically grouped with a number of other artists as showing "a capacity to absorb an intricate religious concept and transform it into their individual art form".

In 1976, a retrospective exhibition of his work was held at the Art Gallery of New South Wales.

== Select bibliography ==
- D. Thomas, Project 11: Weaver Hawkins, exhibition catalogue (Sydney, 1976)
- E. Chanin and S. Miller, The Art and Life of Weaver Hawkins (Sydney, 1995)
- H. de Berg, interview with Weaver Hawkins (transcript, 1965, National Library of Australia)
- Hawkins papers (Art Gallery of New South Wales Library).
