= Michael Kempson =

Michael Kempson (born 1961) is an artist, master printmaker, academic and curator. His work is held in collections on Australia. Since 1986 Kempson has taught printmaking, currently at The University of New South Wales. Internationally he is a visiting professor at the Xi’an Academy of Fine Arts in China, (at the Xi'an University of Technology) and from 2014 to 2016 he was the International Member at Large for Southern Graphics, based in the USA.

== Early life and education ==
Kempson was born in Kapunda, South Australia in 1961. His father was an Anglican minister. From 1980 to 1982 Kempson studied a Bachelor Visual Arts at the City Art Institute, Sydney College of Advanced Education, followed by a Diploma in Professional Art Studies (Printmaking) in 1983. In 1987 Kempson completed a Diploma in Education (Technical), at the Institute of Technical and Adult Teacher Education, Sydney CAE. Subsequently, Kempson received an MFA from the College of Fine Arts, University of New South Wales, (1992-1996).

== Career ==
From 1986 until 2003 Kempson was Head of Printmaking Northern Sydney Institute of TAFE, Meadowbank College. During that time he was a lecturer at the Sydney College of the Arts, University of Sydney in 1999. In 2004 he became a Senior Lecturer and Convenor of Printmaking Studies at Art and Design University of New South Wales where he has remained.

In 2004 Kempson initiated a custom printmaking press at UNSW and became Director of Cicada Press. The press has exchange exhibitions with China, Pakistan, New Zealand, the UK and the US. Cicada Press functions as an educationally focused custom-printing workshop. Kempson oversees and collaborates with all the printmaking research projects, working closely with each artist-in-residence. He has worked with approximately 170 Australian and International artists. Several of the students at the UNSW Printmaking Department have become teachers of printmaking. The artists Ben Rak and Jason Phu. Cicada Press also organizes residencies and workshops with Aboriginal artists around Australia. With the assistance of Tess Allas, Kempson has organised annual workshops of indigenous artists, including Tony Albert, Fiona Foley, Vernon Ah Kee, Brenda Croft, Gordon Hookey, Reko Rennie, Dale Harding, Laurel Nannup, Brett Nannup, Ryan Presley, Jason Wing and Frances Belle Parker. Groups include the Papunya Tjupi, and the Euraba Paper Makers.

Kempson has exhibited in 26 one-person exhibitions and over 200 group exhibitions nationally and internationally. He uses intaglio etching methods. His early work investigates Australian themes of iconic landscapes and animals in intensely personal sometimes surrealistic images.

In the late 1990s Kempson collaborated with Matthew Tome a fellow art teacher at the Institute of TAFE, Meadowbank College, Sydney. They combined various printing techniques such as screen printing, etching, and lithography and produced a series of works on socio-political subjects: Martyrology 1998, and Prime Ministers of Australia 1999.

The Australian Print Council commissioned a limited edition etching/aquatint from Kempson in 2014 titled, “Longing and Belonging”.

Kempson's recent work is centred on Bonsai and ecological concerns. He combined the studies from two residencies – the first in Lake Mungo in the Willandra Lakes World Heritage region and the second in Huashan, the sacred western mountain of the Five Great Mountains of China – to make compositions using the motif of the regional trees.
