= Peter Laverty =

British painter

- Born: 1926
- Died: 2013 (aged 86–87)
- Occupations: Artist, Art educator, administrator
- Spouse: Ursula Laverty (nee. Nathan) m.1952-2013

Peter Laverty (1926–2013) was a painter, print maker, art educator and gallery director. In 1971 to become Head of the National Art School, Sydney, Australia and was Director of the Art Gallery of New South Wales from 1971 to 1977.

== Life and career ==
Peter Phillip Laverty was born in England in 1926 and studied at Winchester School of Art. In 1951, at age 24, he emigrated to Sydney, Australia, to teach at the National art School, Sydney, from 1952 to 1971. He was appointed Director of the Art Gallery of New South Wales from 1971-1977.

Laverty served on numerous committees including: International Society of Art Critics, NSW Travelling Art Scholarship (1971–78), Sydney Biennale Committee (1975–77), Churchill Fellowships (1971–77), and New South Wales art education assessment committees. He judged many art competitions, wrote for several art journals, while giving numerous lectures.

He was a foundation member and President (1980–81) of Sydney Printmakers and member of the Australian Watercolour Institute from 1965.

Peter Laverty died in Sydney, Australia, in 2013, aged 86

== Work ==
Laverty worked in oil, watercolour and graphic media. From 1959 his paintings were mainly semi-abstract stylistically related to contemporary British paintings.

== Exhibitions ==
Laverty was included in several significant group exhibitions of Australian art held in New Zealand (1965), United States (1966), and São Paulo Art Biennial, Brazil (1961). In Australia he held joint exhibitions with his wife Ursula and had a retrospective at Penrith Sydney, in 1996.

== Represented ==
Works by Laverty are held in the collections of the National Gallery of Australia, Art Gallery of New South Wales, Art Gallery of Western Australia, Queensland Art Gallery & Gallery of Modern Art and the Tasmanian Museum and Art Gallery.

== Awards ==
Laverty won numerous Shire art awards including; Warringah (1957), Mosman (1961-2), Maitland (1965), Campbelltown (1966), Rockdale (1966), Berrima (1966), and Grafton (1969).

Cultural offices
Preceded by Hal Missingham	Director of the Art Gallery of New South Wales; 1971–1978	Succeeded by Edmund Capon
