= Melissa, Calabria =

Melissa
- Comune
- Comune di Melissa
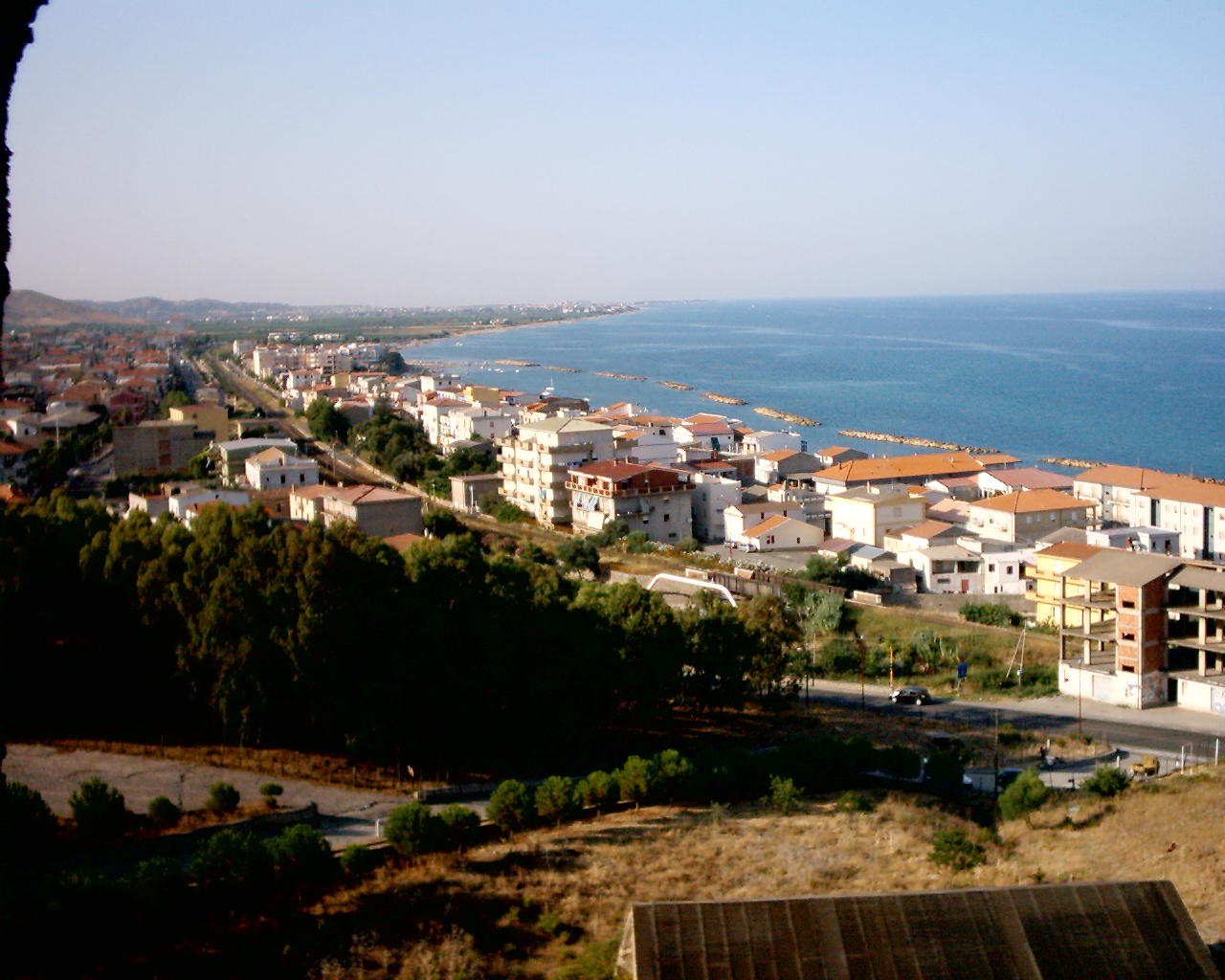

- Coat of arms

- Location within Italy Location within Calabria
- Coordinates: 39°18′30″N 17°01′40″E
- Country: Italy
- Region: Calabria
- Province: Crotone (KR)
- Frazioni: Torre Melissa

Government
  - Mayor: Raffaele Falbo

Area
  - Total: 51 km^{2} (20 sq mi)
- Elevation: 256 m (840 ft)

Population (2011)
  - Total: 3,624
  - Density: 71/km^{2} (180/sq mi)
- Demonym: Melissesi
- Time zone: UTC+1 (CET)
  - Summer (DST): UTC+2 (CEST)
- Postal code: 88817 (88814 Torre Melissa)
- Dialing code: 0962
- Patron saint: Saint Nicholas
- Website: Official website

Melissa (Calabrian: Mèlissë) is a comune in the province of Crotone, in Calabria. The village Melissa is situated in the mountainous inland, while the frazione of Torre Melissa is on the Ionian Sea coast. The Melissa DOC is a Calabrian wine region.

== History ==
Melissa is mentioned for the first time in 13th century documents. It was a fief of the de Micheli family (1463–66), Venetian nobles based in Calabria, of the Campitelli family (1485–1688) and, later, to the Pignatelli (1688–1806).

In 1949 it was the location of a massacre, when the police shot against the population, killing three people.

== Twin towns ==
Melissa is twinned with:

- Gattatico, Italy
- Sant'Ilario d'Enza, Italy
