= Gonfienti =

Coordinates: 43°51′38″N 11°07′33″E

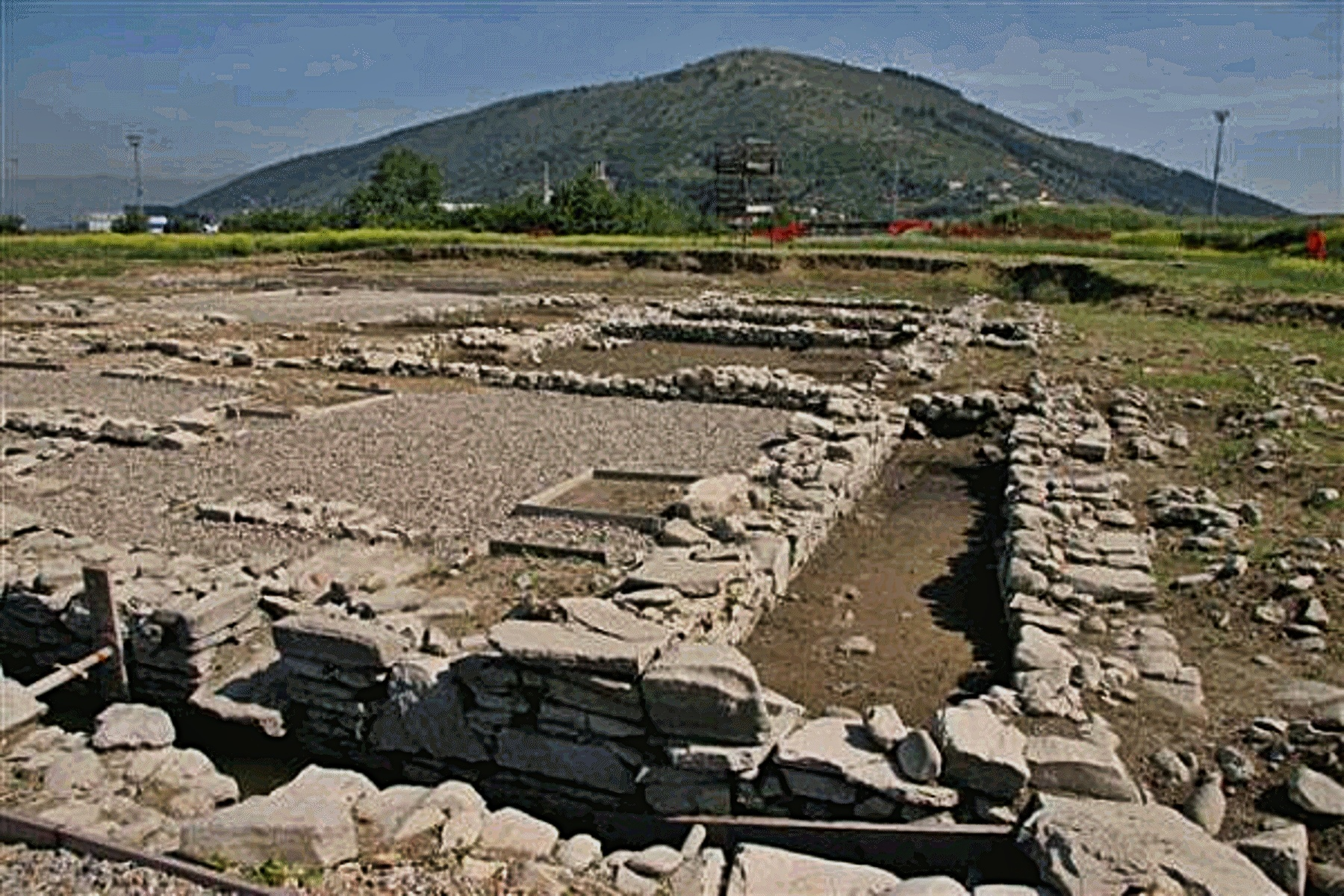
Camars

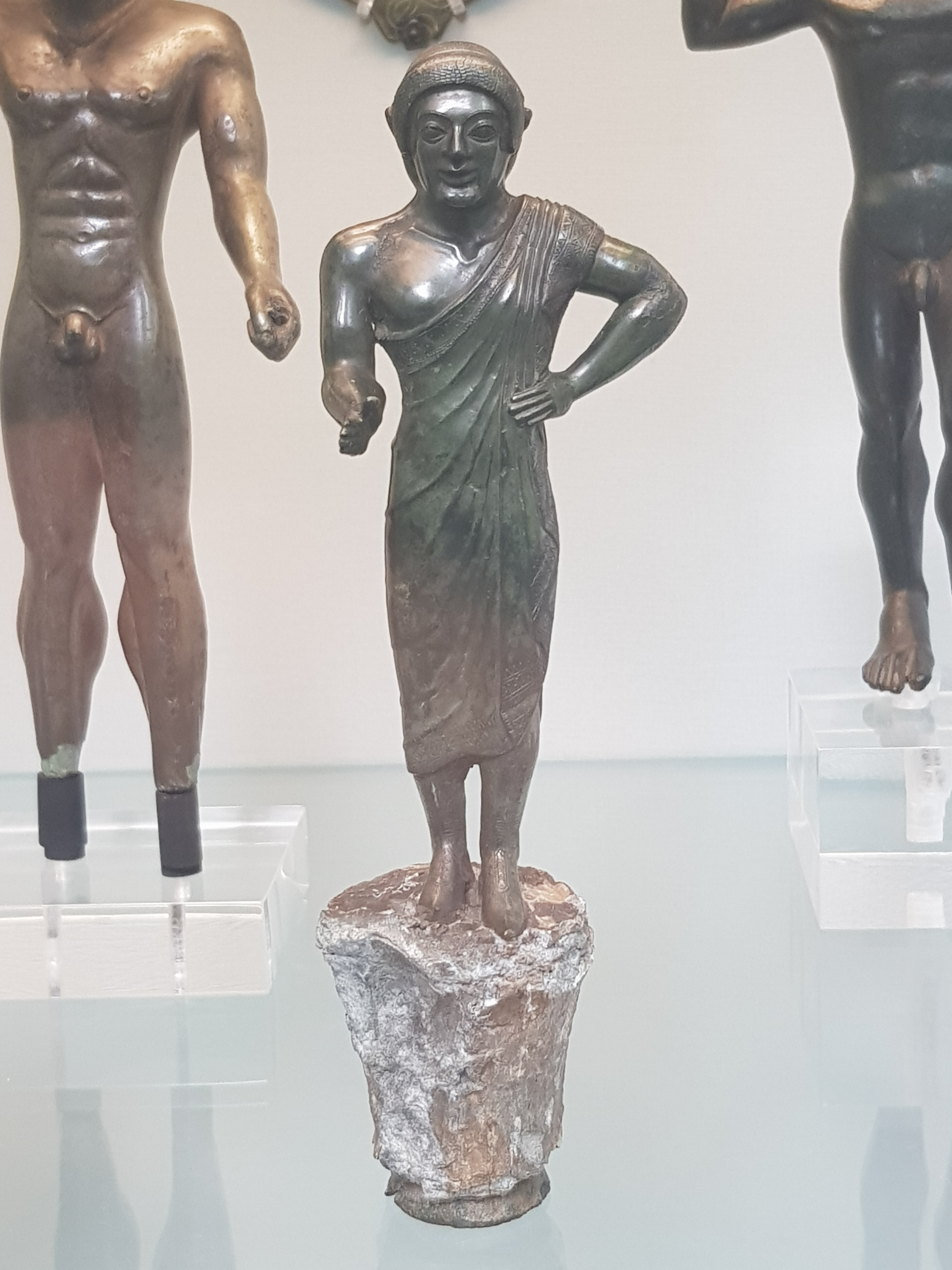
Etruscan Bronze votive figure from Pizzidimonte near Gonfienti, now in the British Museum (500-480 BC)

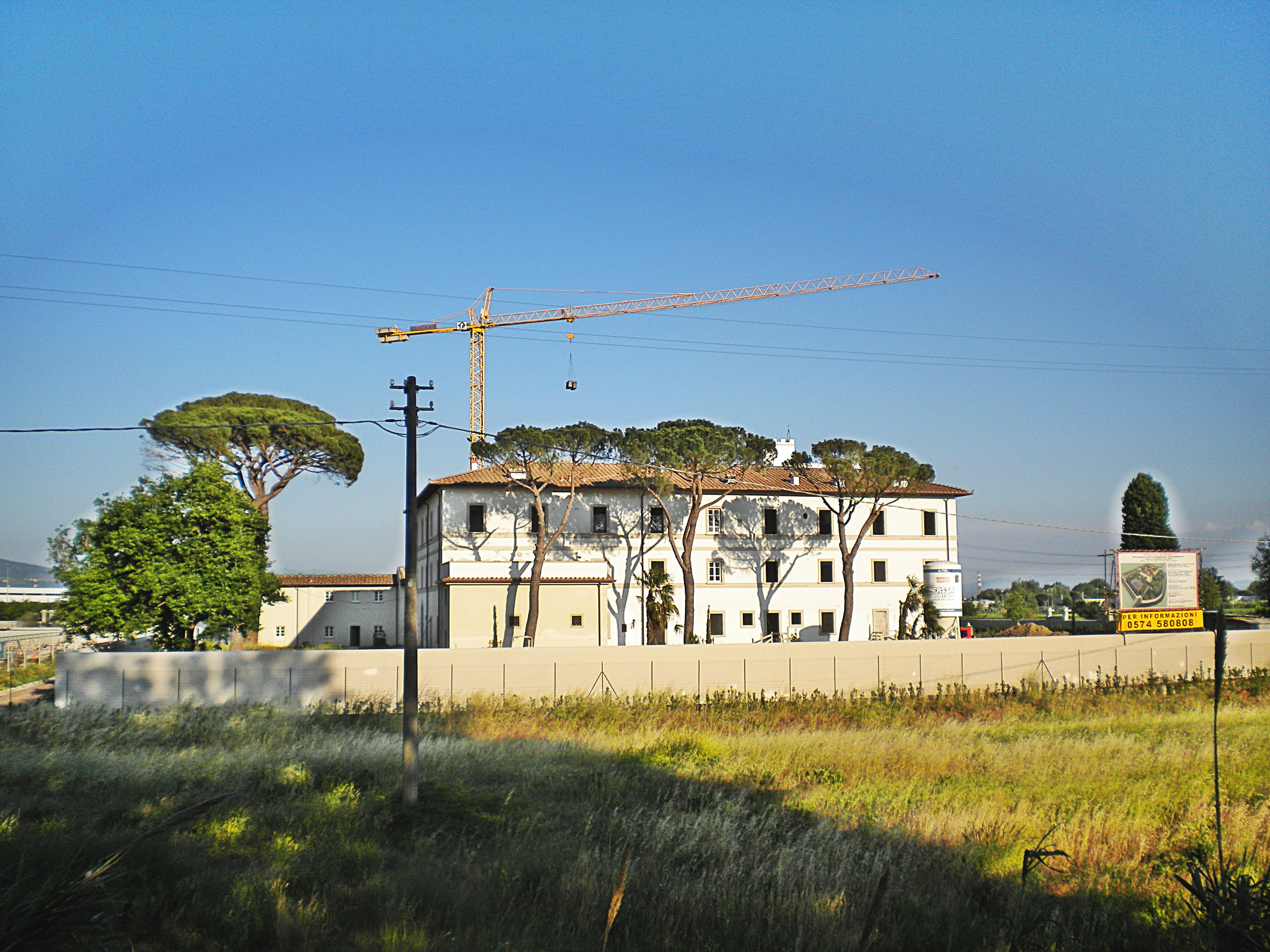
Villa Novellucci

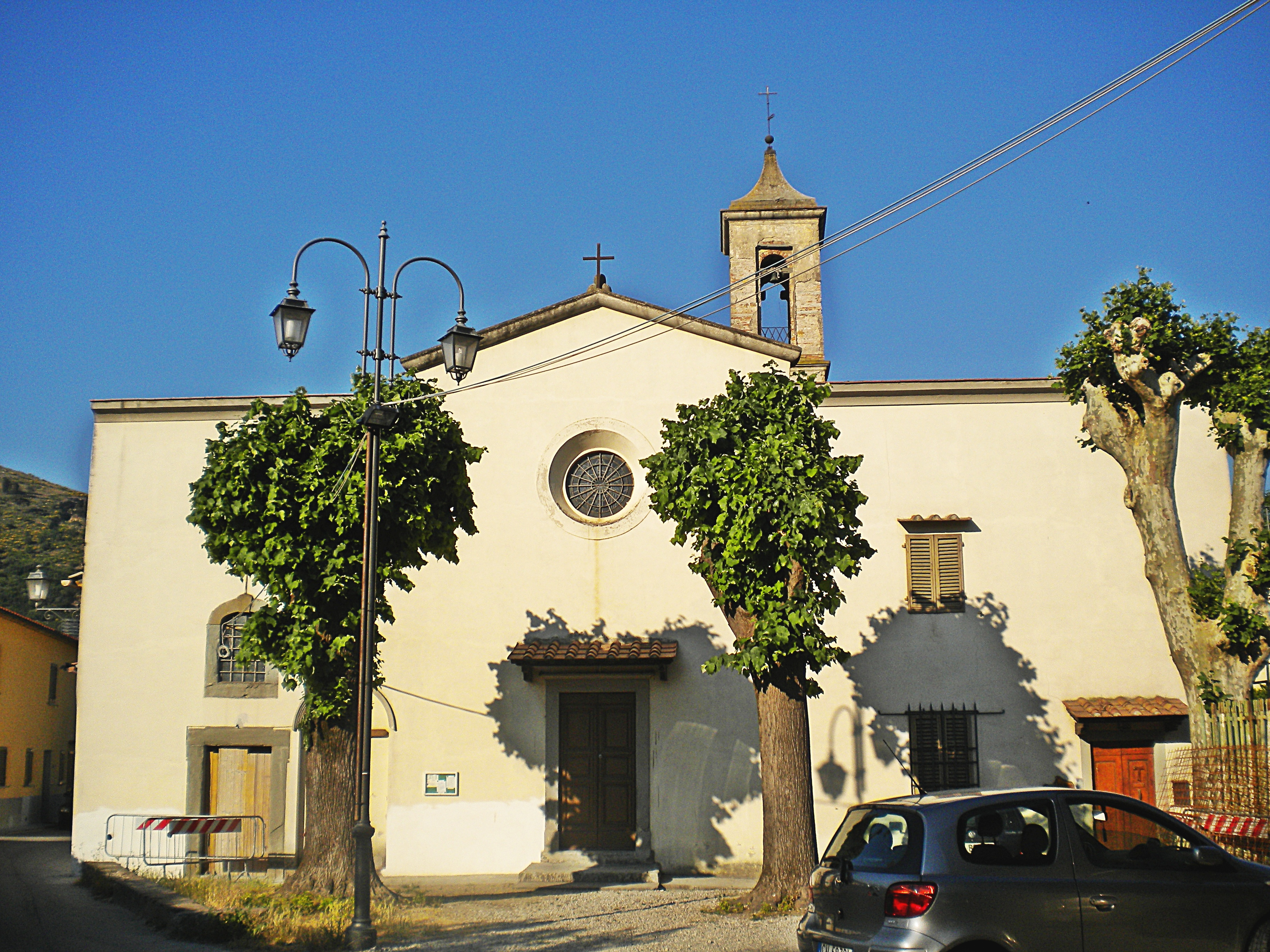
San Martino

Gonfienti is a frazione (detached village) located in the suburbs of the town of Prato. The actor Giorgio Panariello lives here.

== Main sights ==
- Remains of the Etruscan city of Camars.
- Chiesa di San Martino a Gonfienti Chiesa di San Martino a Gonfienti: of ancient origin, it was rebuilt in the 13th century and renewed between the 18th and 19th century. Two altarpieces from the 15th and 16th century, realized by the school of Giovanni Balducci or Giovan Pietro Naldini, are preserved inside.
- An old villa belonged to Novellucci family is located in Gonfienti. It is now under restorations.
