= Michael Brand (art historian) =

Australian art historian (born 1958)

- Born: 9 January 1958 (age 68); Canberra, Australia
- Occupations: Art historian and museum director

Michael Brand (born 9 January 1958) is an art scholar from Australia. Throughout his career, Brand has specialised in the art of Asia, in particular Indian art.

== Early life ==
Brand was born in Canberra, but spent several years in the United States while his father was a representative at the International Monetary Fund. He lived in McLean, Virginia in 1971 and 1972, and spent four years studying in Washington, D.C. to complete high school.

== Education ==
Brand completed his undergraduate studies at the Australian National University in 1979, specialising in Art History and Asian Studies, and attained an MA and PhD at Harvard University in 1982 and 1987 respectively.

== Career ==
After completing his studies, Brand worked as the founding head of Asian art at the National Gallery of Australia. He left for the Queensland Art Gallery later that year, and spent four years working as assistant director. In 2000 he moved to Richmond, Virginia to succeed Katherine C. Lee as director of the Virginia Museum of Fine Arts.

In August 2005 Brand was appointed director of the J. Paul Getty Museum in Los Angeles, refuting speculation that he may have accepted the post of director of the Cleveland Museum of Art, where he would once again have been following in Lee's footsteps. Brand took up the role of director in January 2006.

In 2012, Brand was appointed ninth Director of the Art Gallery of New South Wales, following the retirement of Edmund Capon. He was elected an Honorary Fellow of the Australian Academy of the Humanities in 2024. Brand resigned as director of the AGNSW in October 2024, replaced by Maud Page in March 2025.

== Works ==
- The Age of Angkor: treasures from the National Museum of Cambodia, Canberra, National Gallery of Australia, c1992 ISBN 0642130906
- The Vision of Kings: art and experience in India, Canberra, National Gallery of Australia, c1995 ISBN 0-500-97438-1

Cultural offices
Preceded by Edmund Capon	Director of the Art Gallery of New South Wales; 2011–present	Incumbent
