= Camars =

Coordinates: 43.8558°N 11.1329°E

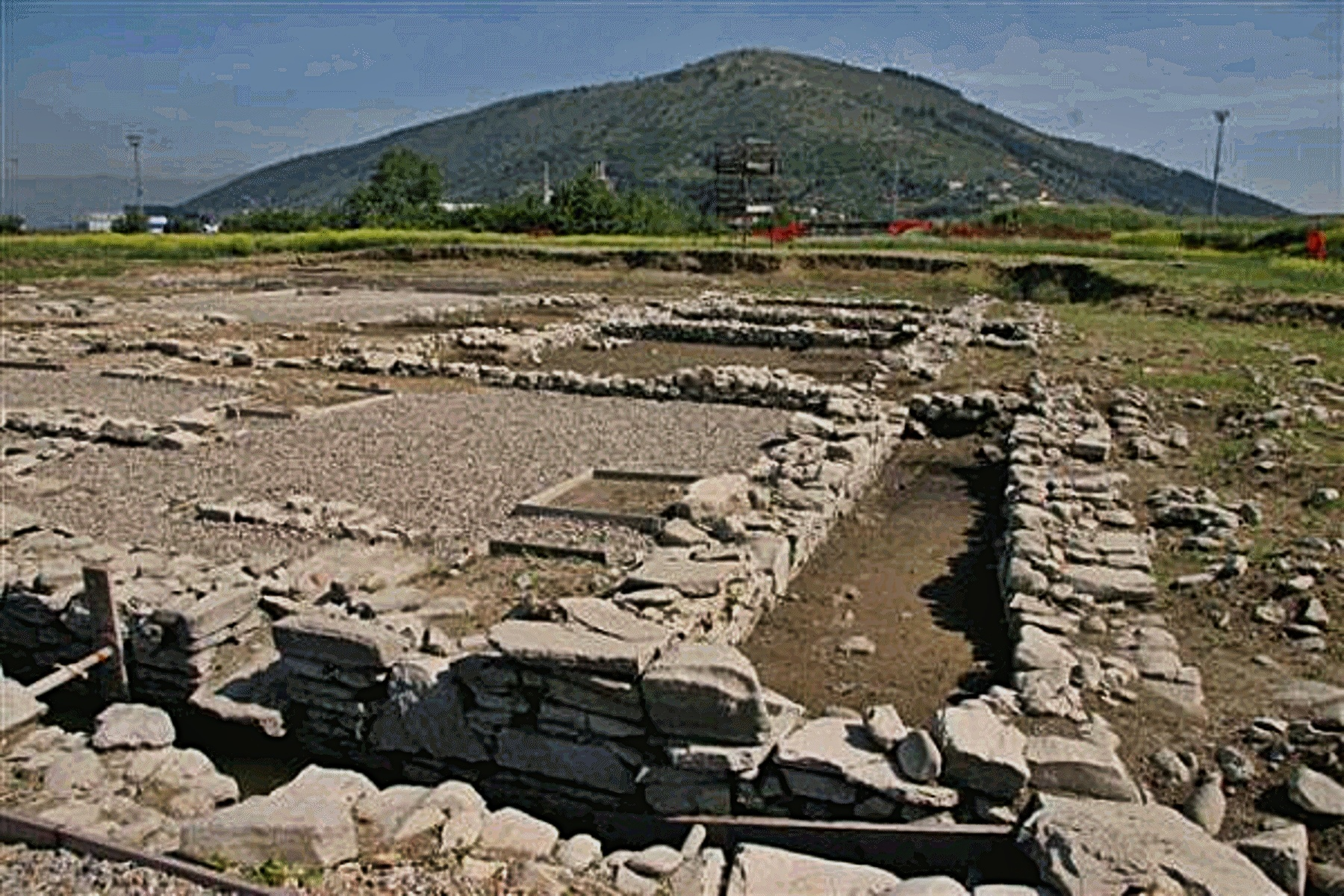
View of Camars excavations.

Camars was an ancient Etruscan city, situated in the village of Gonfienti in the Prato municipality, Tuscany, Italy. (This is a recent hypothesis only, not accepted by almost nobody in the scientific and scholarly community of archaeologists and ancient historians: the traditional interpretation of the ancient sources and of the archaeological evidence correctly places Camars in the area of the modern city of Chiusi, in the district of Siena).

The city was discovered during the course of modern excavation for the creation of the Prato Interport. The ancient site is also spread across the modern municipalities of Campi Bisenzio and Calenzano; the Poggio Castiglioni hill is the site of the upper citadel of the ancient city.

== Overview ==
Excavation revealed substantial evidence for daily life. The site is connected to the Adriatic Sea by means of the Via Salaria which leaves the site en route to Adria.

A substantial courtyard house has been compared to other examples of Etruscan house plans, for instance those of Marzabotto.
