= Bissietta =

Italian artist

- Born: Giuseppe Fontanelli; 10 April 1910; San Miniato, Pisa, Italy
- Died: 11 December 1977 (aged 67); Sant'Ilario d'Enza, Reggio Emilia, Italy
- Education: Royal Conservatory of Santa Chiara; Florence Academy; Brera Academy
- Known for: Painting; illustration; comics
- Notable work: Figurines series; Topolino e il Mostro di Loch-Ness; Mural for St Francis' New Australian Centre
- Movement: Abstract Impressionism
- Spouse: Giuletta Padovani (m. 1933)
- Children: Magda (born 1937)
- Awards: Silver Medal from the Italian Government (1962)

Giuseppe Fontanelli (10 April 1910 – 11 December 1977), better known as Bissietta, was an Italian artist, remembered in Italy for his illustrations and comic strips, and whose later career included twenty years in Australia, where he taught painting and produced works in an abstract impressionist style. He returned to Italy at age 60 and enjoyed his productive last years in his homeland.

== Early life and career ==
Bissietta was born in San Miniato in Pisa, Tuscany, to Eugenio and Assunta Fontanelli née Rossi. He showed an early talent for drawing and studied at the Royal Conservatory of Santa Chiara in San Miniato and the Florence Academy under Federico Andreotti, then at age 18 moved to Milan and the Brera Academy, from which he graduated.

He started work as a poster artist and magazine illustrator, signing his work "Bissietta" (perhaps signifying small and prickly) or "Giovanni Bissietta". He produced cartoons and comic strips for the magazines Cartoccino dei Piccoli, Robinson and L'Audace. He created the character "Nottolino" for the children's newspaper Jumbo (which closed 1938 after being banned), and a comic strip version of the epic poem Orlando Furioso.

He was best known for his "figurines" series of trading cards which, if collected and put in sequence, told an illustrated story in rhyme. One was Carlo Collodi's famous Pinocchio in 27 cards 1929–1930. This was followed by Quando il gallo canter (When the cock crows) in 8 cards, La gola castigata (gluttony punished) in 7, and Questa non la sapevi . . . (You didn't know this . . .) in around 5. Notably, his 27-card set Topolino e il Mostro di Loch-Ness featured "Topolino", a faithful copy of Walt Disney's Mickey Mouse character, uncredited, unauthorised and probably illegal; the first of several Italian artists to copy the great American cartoonist, others being "Buriko" (Antonio Burattini) and "Guasta" (Guglielmo Guastaveglia). (Note: It was not until 1936 that Federico Pedrocchi started his "Paperino" (Donald Duck) stories under licence.)

Bissietta held his first solo exhibition in Milan in 1935. He served as a war correspondent attached to the General Staff in Libya during World War II, and after collaborating with other Italian army artists to create murals for the Palazzo delle Esposizioni in Rome, he became a correspondent for the Giornale dell'Arte. In 1944 he produced Fiori di ghibli (Flowers of the Saharan wind), a collection of thoughts and impressions from his time in Africa, dedicated to his seven-year-old daughter Magda, followed in 1946 by Orme (Footprints), a series of illustrated poems, both published in book form by Gastaldi. He designed costumes and masks for the first Italian production of T. S. Eliot's Murder in the Cathedral, directed by Giorgio Strehler. In the period 1946–1949 he concentrated his painting activity to the towns of San Miniato and Podenzano. He mounted exhibitions of his work in Switzerland, Austria and Belgium, and repaired some frescoes in the San Miniato cathedral.

== Years in Australia ==
Bissietta left for Australia in 1949 by the emigrant ship SS Cyrenia, arriving in Melbourne on 7 December 1949. During the trip, he kept an illustrated diary for the Piacenza newspaper La Libertà. His original intention was to report on Australia for the international press in Turin, and his travel permits were for two years, but having secured a teaching position decided to stay.

In 1950 he created a large mural for the concert hall of St Francis' New Australian Centre in Elizabeth Street, Brisbane, depicting the emigration of New Australians from Europe. One mural, the product of seven months' work, depicts the migrants' departure, their sorrowing relatives and their arrival in sunny Queensland. Another includes a likeness of the artist with Archbishop Duhig and Father Boniface, head of the Capuchin order that ran the centre, previously the Caledonian Buildings. Duhig was a nephew of the art critic and pathologist Dr J. V. Duhig.

He began teaching at Antonio Dattilo Rubbo's ADR Art School at Century House, 70 Pitt Street, Sydney, and organized annual exhibitions of work by his students from 1951 onwards, and took over the school when its founder retired. In July 1954 he opened the Bissietta Art Gallery at the same location, with an exhibition that included works by Judy Cassab, Douglas Dundas, Donald Friend, Philippa Keane, Michael Kmit, Lloyd Rees, and Roland Wakelin. He painted a mural for Repin's coffee shop on Pitt Street.

In 1957 Bissietta hosted an exhibition of works by Six Directions, an art collective of refugees from Estonia, Latvia and Lithuania, with whom he had a long association, and of which, according to one art historian, he was a member.

He was naturalized as an Australian citizen in February 1960.

Other activities during his twenty years in Australia include:

- as director of an Italian Art School in Sydney
- teaching at the National Art School in Sydney
- artistic director of a Summer School of the University of Adelaide
- as correspondent for Perugia's University for Foreigners
- giving lectures in the Italian language at the Conservatorium of Music.
- directing a film Villa Etruria made by his students
- exhibiting at the first Young Festival in 1965

== Return to Italy ==
Bissietta returned to Italy in 1970 and taught art history at the University for Foreigners Perugia. In 1971, he held his first retrospective exhibition in the International Art Gallery of Florence. He coordinated the international summer courses at the Academy of Fine Arts in Perugia. He ran summer courses in fine arts and Italian art history at the American Institute for Foreign Study at Greenwich, Connecticut. This was a productive time for Bissietta, referred to as his "geometric-luminous" period. He died in Sant'Ilario d'Enza on 11 December 1977. His remains and those of his wife are buried in San Miniato.

== Recognition ==
- In 1948 Bissietta was made a member of the Euteleti Academy (Note: Accademia degli Euteleti, a Tuscan academy of sciences and letters, founded in May 1822. In 1938 it became a non-profit organisation devoted to organising scientific exhibitions and conferences. Since 1984 it has had its premises in the 14th century Palazzo Migliorati.) of San Miniato
- In 1962 he was awarded a silver medal from the Italian government for his promotion of Italian culture in Australia
- From 1974 to 1977 he was president of the Arciconfraternita di Misericordia of San Miniato.
- On 9 February 2019 a retrospective exhibition of his works was mounted at the Palazzo Grifoni in San Miniato, organised by the painter Luca Macchi. It comprised 62 of his works spanning a lifetime of work, mostly on loan from private collections: 47 paintings, 4 sketches for Murder in the Cathedral, 5 sculptures and 10 drawings. A large altarpiece in the Church of the Holy Trinity, San Miniato, was part of the exhibition, but remained in situ.

== Family ==
Bissietta (or rather Giuseppe Fontanelli) married Giuletta Padovani in Milan 1933; they had a daughter Magda in 1937. They were living in Piacenza in 1954 when he opened the Bissietta Gallery, and hopes were expressed that they would join him shortly, but there is no evidence available to indicate that this occurred, and Magda appears to have been a well-known citizen of Sant'Ilario d'Enza.

== See also ==
- Italian website dedicated to Bissietta
- Lambiek Comiclopedia biography.
