= Six Directions =

Australian art collective

Six Directions was an art collective in Sydney, Australia, formed in 1953 by six post-war immigrants from Europe. They held group exhibitions at Bissietta's Gallery, at 70 Pitt Street, Sydney in 1957 and at the Riverside Gallery, Canberra, in 1958. All were members of the Contemporary Art Society of New South Wales, and were described as bringing new interest in texture to Australia.

== Members ==
- Edgar Eduard Aavik (born in Estonia, 1913, died 5 June 1998, Thirlmere, New South Wales) was a sculptor of Darling Point, active in Sydney in the 1950s. Aavik arrived in Australia in 1949 and taught at the East Sydney Technical College 1949–1955. He was, in 1970, a Liberal candidate for the Australian Senate. He gave occasional public lectures on contemporary art.
- Uldis Abolins (born in Latvia, 1923, died 13 July 2010) was a painter in watercolors and designer of stage sets. He won prizes at various art competitions throughout New South Wales and South Australia between 1958 and 1965.
- Giuseppe Fontanelli aka Bissietta (born in Florence, 1910, died 11 December 1977, S. Ilario d'Enza, Italy) arrived in Australia in 1949. He ran an art gallery at Pitt Street, where the group held an exhibition in 1957, and ran an art school. He painted a mural for the concert hall in St Francis' New Australian Centre, Elizabeth Street. He was for ten years teacher at the ADR Art School in Sydney, which he took over when its founder (Anthony Dattilo Rubbo) retired. He was also a lecturer in Italian at the Conservatorium of Music.
- Dzem Krivs (born in Latvia, 1924) was a painter and graphic artist. One example of his work was held in the Art Gallery of New South Wales. Apart from work with the group, he exhibited with Abolins at the David Jones Gallery in 1955. Also known as James Krivs, he was a champion table-tennis player.
- Jurgis Miksevicius (born in Lithuania, 1923 – 2014) also exhibited with the Artists' Society of Canberra before moving to Sydney.
- August Mölder (born in Estonia, 14 January 1914, died 1982) was also represented in the Estonian Exhibition of 1951, which included works from all over the world.
- Henry Salkauskas (born in Lithuania, 6 May 1925, died Sydney, 31 August 1979) arrived in Australia 1949. Later known for large prints and watercolors, he was a foundation member of Sydney Printmakers and a member of the Contemporary Art Society. See main article
