= Helena Rubinstein Portrait Prize =

Former Australian art prize

Helena Rubinstein Portrait Prize was an annual prize for portraiture by an Australian artist awarded between 1960 and 1966.

== History ==
Founded in 1960 and named to honour businesswoman and philanthropist Helena Rubenstein, the prize was awarded by the Helena Rubinstein Foundation (disbanded 2011), and mostly staged at the Claude Hotchin Gallery in Western Australia. In 1965, the prize was judged by Kym Bonython, and selected paintings from the finalists' exhibition were shown in Canberra, Goulburn, Newcastle, and Brisbane.

The prize was worth A£ 300.

It is likely that the prize ceased in 1966.

== List of winners ==
- 1960: Romola Clifton
- 1961: William Boissevain
- 1962: Margaret Olley
- 1963: Vladas Meskenas with a double portrait of Weaver Hawkins and his wife.
- 1964: Judy Cassab for a portrait of art collector Oscar Edwards
- 1965: Judy Cassab
- 1966: J. Carington Smith
