= Fontanelli =

Fontanelli is an Italian surname. Notable people with the surname include:

- Achille Fontanelli (1775–1838), Italian nationalist and Napoleonic general
- Alfonso Fontanelli (1557–1622), Italian composer
- Cristina Fontanelli, American actress and opera singer
- Fabiano Fontanelli (born 1965), Italian cyclist
- Giuseppe Fontanelli, known as Bissietta (1910–1977), Italian painter in Australia
