= Sydney Printmakers =

Australian printmaking association

- Formation: 1961
- Type: Artist collective
- Region served: Sydney, Australia
- Website: sydneyprintmakers.com

Sydney Printmakers is a collective of professional Australian printmakers, founded in Sydney in 1961. The group was formed to promote and develop the art of printmaking, and to provide a platform for printmakers to exhibit and collaborate.

== History ==
The group emerged at a time when interest in printmaking was experiencing a resurgence, following a lull after the etching boom of the late 1930s. Sydney Printmakers was established as an alternative to the more conservative art institutions of the time, providing opportunities for artists working in contemporary and experimental print practices.

Over the decades, the collective has held numerous exhibitions both nationally and internationally, showcasing a diverse range of printmaking techniques including linocut, etching, lithography, screen printing, collagraphy, and digital processes. The organization remains one of Australia’s longest-running and most prominent printmaking collectives.

== Collections ==
Prints by Sydney Printmakers members are represented in major Australian public collections, including:

- National Gallery of Australia
- Art Gallery of New South Wales
- Geelong Gallery
- Manly Art Gallery & Museum
- Broken Hill Regional Art Gallery
- Wagga Wagga Art Gallery

== Notable Members ==
Members have included prominent Australian artists who have contributed significantly to the field of printmaking.

- Earle Backen
- Sue Buckley
- John Coburn
- Joy Ewart
- Roy Fluke
- Strom Gould
- Weaver Hawkins
- Eva Kubbos
- Ursula Laverty
- Peter Laverty
- Vaclovas Ratas
- Elizabeth Rooney
- Henry Salkauskas
- James Sharp
- Algirdas Simkunas
- Rod Armstrong
- Karen Ball
- Tina Barahanos
- Susan Baran
- Anthea Boesenberg
- Ruth Burgess
- Rafael Butron
- Seong Cho
- Neilton Clarke
- Edith Cowlishaw
- Danielle Creenaune
- Tanya Crothers
- Jacqui Driver
- Marcus Dyer – Harrison
- Olwen Evans Wilson
- Angus Fisher
- Salvatore Gerardi
- Maximilian Gosling
- Rew Hanks
- Nathalie Hartog-Gautier
- Melissa Harvey
- Angela Hayson
- Lea Kannar-Lichtenberger
- Roslyn Kean
- Michael Kempson
- Therese Kenyon
- Carmen Ky
- George Lo Grasso
- Graham Marchant
- Seraphina Martin
- Carolyn McKenzie-Craig
- Helen Morgan
- Ro Murray
- Esther Neate
- Evan Pank
- Janet Parker-Smith
- Tiiu Reissar
- Sandi Rigby
- Jenny Robinson
- Marta Romer
- Mark Rowden
- Susan Rushforth
- Anna Russell
- Denise Scholz-Wulfing
- Gary Shinfield
- Anne Smith
- Laura Stark
- Anne Starling
- Wendy Stokes
- Andrew Totman
- Rose Vickers
- Lois Waters
- Thea Weiss
- Mirra Whale
- Ann Bewah Wu
- Cheryle Yin-Lo
- Sharon Zwi
- David Strachan

== See also ==
- Print Council of Australia
- Australian printmaking
- List of Australian artists
- Visual arts of Australia
- Australian poster collectives
