= David Edgar Strachan =

Australian artist

- Born: 25 June 1919; Salisbury, England
- Died: 23 November 1970 (aged 51); Yass, New South Wales, Australia
- Known for: artist (painter), printmaker, teacher
- Notable work: etchings, lithographs

David Edgar Strachan (25 June 1919 – 23 November 1970) was an Australian painter, printmaker and teacher.

Strachan was born in Salisbury, Wiltshire, England, in 1919 to a doctor in the Australian Army. In 1920 David and his family moved to Adelaide, later moving to Creswick, Victoria. He was educated at Geelong Grammar School, Victoria.

He moved to London in 1936 to study at the Slade School of Fine Art under Randolph Schwabe for two years. In 1937 he attended the Académie de la Grande Chaumière, Paris and worked as a printmaker. He returned to Australia in April 1938 and worked with George Bell in Melbourne for a few years.

Strachan moved to Sydney in 1941, and exhibited with many other prominent artists of the Contemporary Art Group. He again left for Europe in 1948 where he began experimenting in etching in Paris.

In May 1960 Strachan returned to Sydney, continuing to exhibit. He was a member of Sydney Printmakers, and taught etching at East Sydney Technical College (1960–1965). He was the last president of the Society of Artists, serving in 1965.

Strachan held solo and group shows in London and Paris and appeared in the Paris UNESCO Exposition. He exhibited his prints in numerous Australian galleries between 1961 and 1978.

He won the Wynne Prize in 1961 and 1964.

Strachan died on 23 November 1970 from a motorcar accident near Yass, New South Wales.

His works are held in 15 major galleries in Australia and in many European and American galleries.
