= Laura Leigh =

Laura Leigh can refer to:

- Laura Hofrichter, actress who is credited as "Laura Leigh" in a number of films including Do Not Disturb
- Laura-Leigh, American actress

== See also ==
- Laura Lee (disambiguation)
- Lauralee, a given name
- Lora Leigh (born 1965), American author of erotic romance novels
