= Laura Lee =

Laura Lee can refer to:

- Dame Laura Lee (executive), CEO of British Maggie's cancer drop-in centres
- Laura Lee (singer-songwriter) (born 1945), American soul and gospel singer-songwriter
- Laura Lee (sex worker) (1973–2018), Irish-born sex worker and activist based in the UK
- Laura Lee (bassist) (born 1986), Mexican-American bassist and singer-songwriter (Khruangbin)
- Laura Lee (YouTuber) (born 1988), American make-up artist, YouTuber, beauty blogger, and beauty influencer

== See also ==
- Laura Leigh (disambiguation)
- Laura-Lee Smith (born 1978), New Zealand table tennis player
- Lauralee, given name
- Division of Laura Lee, Swedish musical collective
- Laurel Lee (disambiguation)
- Lora Leigh (born 1965), American author of erotic romance novels
