= WPKN =

- Bridgeport, Connecticut; United States
- Broadcast area: Connecticut: Fairfield County; Litchfield County; Middlesex County; New Haven County; New York: Putnam County; Suffolk County
- Frequency: 89.5 MHz

Programming
- Language: English
- Format: Freeform variety
- Affiliations: Pacifica Radio Network

Ownership
- Owner: WPKN, Inc.

History
- First air date: May 2, 1963; 63 years ago
- Call sign meaning: Purple Knights Network

Technical information
- Licensing authority: FCC
- Facility ID: 73886
- Class: B
- ERP: 10,000 watts
- HAAT: 169 meters (554 ft)
- Transmitter coordinates: 41.279°N 73.185°W
- Translator: (102.5 MHz) W273EB (Westport)

Links
- Public license information: Public file; LMS
- Webcast: Listen live
- Website: wpkn.org

WPKN (89.5 FM) is a non-commercial radio station licensed by the Federal Communications Commission (FCC) to Bridgeport, Connecticut. WPKN is a free-form radio station, staffed by volunteer programmers presenting a wide variety of music and public affairs programming. The syndicated weekly radio newsmagazine Between the Lines, a weekly show, was first produced in 1991 with Scott Harris, Denise Manzari, Bob Nixon, environmental journalist Jim Motavalli and many others at WPKN. Since 1993, Harris has been Between The Lines' executive producer.

== History ==
Logo prior to May 2020

WPKN went on the air on May 2, 1963, as the college radio station of the University of Bridgeport, but became independent of the university in 1989. Its call letters originally stood for "Purple Knights Network," named after the university's sports teams.

Many stations below the 92 MHz FM band receive funds from commercial entities despite being part of the non-commercial radio band. This is thought by some to present the potential for conflicts of interest. WPKN only takes funds from private donors with no stipulations for their expenditure attached. This allows the music and news programmers complete freedom to produce their own shows with no outside pressure.

WPKN also had a carrier current on 540 AM.

In a 2021 article for The New Yorker, David Owen labeled WPKN "the greatest radio station in the world", praising its human-made playlists in comparison to "corporate algorithms" on other radio stations.

== See also ==
- List of community radio stations in the United States
