= Laurel McSherry =

Australian artist and academic

Laurel McSherry is an artist and Director of the Graduate Landscape Architecture Program at the Morgan State University School of Architecture and Planning in Baltimore. Previously, she was the graduate landscape architecture program director at Virginia Tech's Washington-Alexandria Architecture Center. Her design research work is award-winning and frequently focuses on rivers and their drainage basins.

== Early life ==
McSherry is a New Jersey native, especially inspired by the Raritan and Delaware Valleys. McSherry is a graduate of Rutgers University and the Harvard Graduate School of Design. L

== Career ==
In 1999, McSherry was awarded a Rome Prize and was in residence at the American Academy in Rome which she pursued during 1999–2000.

As a practicing landscape architect, McSherry is known for connecting her designs to specific places and for work in watersheds. Her and Terry Surjan's design for the 2004-2005 Flight 93 National Memorial was one of five finalists in the international competition.

McSherry is also recognized as a teacher. In 2018, she was elevated to the Council of Educators in Landscape Architecture Academy of Fellows. Fellows are chosen by their peers, and the fellowship recognizes lifetime achievements in teaching and scholarship. Prior to becoming director of the Graduate Landscape Architecture Program at Virginia Tech, she was Head of Landscape Architecture at Ohio State University and was an associate professor of environmental planning and landscape architecture at Arizona State University.

She was awarded a Fulbright Fellowship in 2017 to conduct research and make art at The Glasgow School of Art in 2018. The work produced in Glasgow was featured at the University of Pennsylvania as part of a 2019 celebration of the 50th anniversary of Ian McHarg's landmark book, “Design With Nature Now.” The installation at the Arthur Ross Gallery, titled A Book of Days, was designed to push audiences to view everyday landscapes and time in new ways.

She has collaborated with Frederick Steiner, Dean and Paley Professor for the University of Pennsylvania Stuart Weitzman School of Design on several design and scholarly projects, including a design ideas competition for the New York City Aquarium and reuse of a Phoenix landfill.

== Awards ==
McSherry is a multiple award winner:

- Landscape Architecture Magazine’s Visionary and Un-Built Design Competition, Winner, 1995
- Rome Prize in Landscape Architecture, given by the American Academy in Rome. 1999
- Flight 93 National Memorial Competition, finalist, 2005
- Re-Envisioning Gate National Recreation Area Competition, Third Prize, 2007
- Sichuan Earthquake Memorial Competition, honorable mention, 2008
- William Turnbull Prize, 2008 (work in researching watersheds)
- Arid Lands Institute and California Architectural Foundation Drylands Design Competition, winner, 2012
- Peace Corps Commemorative Competition, finalist, 2015
- Tessa Dignitas Urban Design Competition, third prize, 2015
- New York City Aquarium and Public Waterfront Competition, third prize, 2016
