= Lauralee Martin =

Lauralee E. Martin was the president and CEO of HCP, Inc., a publicly traded healthcare REIT based in Irvine, California. Previous to her role at HCP, Martin was chief executive of the Americas division of Jones Lang LaSalle.

== Education and experience ==
Martin received a Bachelor of Arts degree in English from Oregon State University and a Master of Business Administration from the University of Connecticut where she was also inducted into their Hall of Fame. After graduation, she was a financial analyst at GE Capital. She worked briefly within the consumer products group but then worked throughout their real estate businesses such as: started the Real Estate Sale Leaseback Business, strategic planner involved with the sale of the Residential Second Mortgage business, President of General Electric Mortgage which she sold to Commonwealth Savings and Loan, started their Commercial Construction loan business.

== Real estate ==
After leaving GE in 1987, Martin joined Heller Financial, rising to president of the Real Estate Finance Division. In 1995, she became the Corporate CFO, where she assisted with their Initial public offering in 1998. The company was subsequently purchased by General Electric Capital Corp. for $5.3 billion in 2001. Martin was then hired as CFO at Jones Lang LaSalle, then promoted to Chief Operating and Financial Office, and then in 2013 became CEO of the Americas Division. Martin joined HCP as CEO in October 2013 and remained in that capacity until July 12, 2016.

== Boards ==
Martin is a member of Kaiser Aluminum, Marcus & Millichap, QuadReal Property Group. She was on the board of ABM, HCP, Heller Financial, Jones Lang LaSalle, and on the KeyCorp board from 2004 until 2010 and on the Gables Residential Trust board from 1994 to 2005.

== Conservation ==
She is an advocate of sustainability and energy conservation in commercial real estate development and was named one of Crain's Chicago Business 25 women to watch.
