= Laurel (surname) =

Laurel is a surname which may refer to:

- Alicia Bay Laurel (born 1949), American artist, author and musician
- Arsenio Laurel (1931–1967), Filipino race car driver, son of José P. Laurel
- Brenda Laurel (born 1950), an advocate for girl video game development
- José P. Laurel (1891–1959), former President of the Philippines
- Juan Tomás Ávila Laurel (born 1966), Annobonese writer from Spanish Guinea (now Equatorial Guinea)
- Salvador Laurel (1928–2004), former Vice-President of the Philippines, son of José P. Laurel
- Sotero Laurel (1918–2009), Filipino politician, older brother of Salvador Laurel
- Stan Laurel (1890–1965), half of the comic duo Laurel and Hardy

== See also ==
- Laurel (given name)
