= Joyce Vera Mary Ewart =

Australian artist (1916–1964)

Joyce Vera Mary Ewart (1916–1964) was an Australian painter, graphic artist, and teacher. She was a finalist for the Archibald Prize in 1943, 1944, 1945 and 1948; for the Wynne Prize in 1943, 1945 and 1946; and the recipient of the Mosman Art Prize in 1948. Her works are held by the Art Gallery of New South Wales and have been included in several retrospectives and exhibitions. She mounted solo exhibitions at the Macquarie Galleries in 1942, 1943, 1944, 1948 and 1953. She founded the Workshop Art Centre at Willoughby, NSW where the main gallery bears her name and which offers the Joy Ewart Scholarship for Year 10 students and the Ewart Art Prize for works by Centre members. As Ewart included lithography and etching presses in the art centre, it was able to host The Print Circle collective of women artists.

== Early life ==
Joy Ewart was born on August 29, 1916, in Murrumburrah, New South Wales. She studied at the East Sydney Technical College, and then with Sydney art teachers Antonio Dattilo Rubbo and Desiderius Orban. She left to study in the UK and Europe in 1949, and later took a printmaking course at Tulane University, Louisiana, on a Fulbright scholarship.
