= Laurel Mellin =

American author and clinical professor

- Born: Laurel Mellin; April 17, 1949 (age 77)
- Education: Bachelor of Arts in Humanities, PhD in Health Psychology
- Alma mater: University of California, Berkeley, Northcentral University
- Occupations: Author, Professor
- Writing career
- Language: English
- Genre: health
- Website: www.ebt.org

Laurel Mellin is an American author of nine books focusing on brain-based health, stress overload, and stress eating, including The New York Times Best Seller, The Pathway. She developed emotional brain training, a method of emotional regulation that rapidly reduces stress and promotes rewiring stress-induced problems.

== Career ==
Mellin is a health psychologist and an Associate Clinical Professor of Family and Community Medicine and Pediatrics at the University of California, San Francisco's School of Medicine, retiring in 2022.

Mellin is also the founder of emotional brain training in San Anselmo, California, a method for rewiring stress and promoting resilience. The conceptual basis for EBT is brain-based health, using the brain's executive functioning to rewire the circuits of reflexive responses in the unconscious mind. The approach optimizes personal control over health and well-being and promotes emotional and spiritual evolution. She is the executive director of the Solution Foundation, with the mission of training professionals, educating the public, conducting research, and providing services to the underserved based on neuroscientific, evidence-based methods of rewiring the emotional brain. Mellin has authored 11 books on EBT and is a New York Times bestselling author.

Mellin's recent work has applied neuroplasticity to treating obesity and other stress-induced health problems. She advanced the research of Robert Lustig and Michele Meitus-Snyder, who proposed that the neuroendocrine core of the limbic brain evolved to promote weight gain in response to stress, specifically, the starvation center (hypothalamus), reward center (ventral tegmental area and nucleus accumbens), and stress center (amygdala). Mellin reframed obesity as a consequence of stress-induced changes in all three brain centers that activate a biochemical cascade of stress hormones that promote weight gain in stress. Applying the research of Peter Sterling who coined the term allostasis and proposed a process of protective stress overload, maintaining physiologic stability by changing behavior and physiology and Joseph LeDoux's research on survival circuits, Mellin proposed potential clinical targets for neuroplastcity, including threat detection errors in the amygdala, reward prediction errors in the nucleus accumbens and metabolic adaptation rewards in the hypothalamus, and the use of emotional brain training (EBT) tools to rewire them.

== Emotional brain training ==
According to EBT, the tools of the method provide the public with more control over the emotional brain, which traditionally has been seen as controlled by mental health professions through psychotherapy, medications, or procedures. With her colleagues at UCSF (Igor Mitrovic, Lynda Frassetto, and Lindsey Fish), she developed the EBT tools as a public health way to switch off and over time, weaken the circuits that are a root cause of up to 90 percent of health problems. Self-help methods have focused on changing the neocortex, however, the faulty emotional circuits that are a root cause of stress overload (allostasis and allostatic load) are stored in the emotional brain. Cognitive tools are effective in low-stress but not in the high-stress levels that are normal in modern life. According to EBT theory, stress is good for people as it activates faulty circuits and it is only when they are activated that emotional processing can change them. The emotional tools of EBT give users a resource for activating and switching off these circuits to promote well-being and lasting improvements in stress-related emotional, behavioral, cognitive, and physiologic problems. The program is evidence-based with ten studies supporting its effectiveness. In 2011, the EBT research team published a summary of this approach to healthcare: rewiring the stress response.

== Published works ==
- Mellin, Laurel. The Solution: For Safe, Healthy, and Permanent Weight Loss, HarperCollins, 1998. ISBN 0060987243
- Mellin, Laurel. The Pathway: Follow the Road to Health and Happiness, HarperCollins, 2003. ISBN 0060514035
- Mellin, Laurel. The 3-Day Solution Plan: Jump-start Lasting Weight Loss by Turning Off the Drive to Overeat [BURST:] Lose up to 6 pounds in 3 days!, Ballantine Books, 2005. ISBN 978-1400063772
- Mellin, Laurel. Wired For Joy!: A Revolutionary Method for Creating Happiness from Within, Hay House, 2010. ISBN 978-1401925864
- Mellin, Laurel. Emotional Brain Training: Getting Started with EBT, EBT Basics, 2012. ISBN 978-1893265233
- Mitrovic, Fish DePeña, L, Frassetto, L, Mellin, L "Rewiring the Stress Response: A New Paradigm for Health Care" Hypothesis (9:1-5)
- Mellin, Laurel. "Spiral Up!: Train Your Brain to Release Stress", EBT, Inc. 2016. ISBN 978-1-893265-34-9
- Mellin, Laurel. "The Stress Eating Solution: A Proven, Neuroscience Method for Ending Overeating", EBT, Inc. 2019 ISBN 978-0986410772
- Mellin, Laurel. "The Stress Overload Solution: A Proven, Neuroscience Method for Optimal Well-being", EBT, Inc. 2019. ISBN 978-0578512815
- Mellin, Laurel. "What's my number?": One Simple Question that Unlocks Your Brain's Power for Health, Happiness & Purpose", EBT, Inc. 2020. ISBN 978-1893265011
- Mellin, Laurel. "The Stress Solution: A Revolutionary New Method for Emotional Resilience", EBT, Inc. 2020. ISBN 978-1893265042
- Mellin, Laurel. "1-2-3 Joy!: Easy, Natural Weight Loss that is Scientific, Proven, Drug-Free & Fun, EBT, Inc. 2024. ISBN 978-0262043304
