= Laurel Neme =

American science writer

Laurel A. Neme is an American writer and consultant in environmental and wildlife policy and natural resource management. She is the author of the book Animal Investigators: How the World's First Wildlife Forensics Lab Is Solving Crimes and Saving Endangered Species. She has worked as a consultant for the United States Department of the Treasury, the World Bank, bilateral donors such as United States Agency for International Development (USAID), and non-governmental organizations including the Environmental Defense Fund, The Nature Conservancy, and the World Wildlife Fund.

== Education ==
Laurel A. Neme holds a PhD in international and public affairs from Princeton University and a master's degree in Public Policy and a B.A. in political science from the University of Michigan.

== Career ==
=== Animal Investigators (2009) ===
Neme's 2009 book Animal Investigators describes the work of the Clark R. Bavin National Fish and Wildlife Forensic Laboratory in Ashland, Oregon, which investigates crimes against wildlife. It is described as "a CSI for wildlife," the first and only crime lab of its kind. She has appeared on numerous radio and television shows to talk about the emerging science of animal forensics and the $20 billion worldwide business of smuggling wildlife and wild animal parts. Time magazine also interviewed her about the wildlife black market and the attempts to investigate and stop it. Interest in the lab reportedly "soared" following the book's publication.

A review of the book in E–The Environmental Magazine noted that "Those who enjoy the inner workings of a walrus dissection will appreciate Neme's attention to detail. [...] There's a lot of potential here, but more particulars than the average reader (or CSI-watcher) is likely to want to sift through." The book was also reviewed in the Australian Journal of Forensic Sciences, New Scientist, and The Oregonian.

=== Writing and radio broadcasting ===
Neme works as a writer/editor for Earth Negotiations Bulletin, a publication of the International Institute for Sustainable Development (IISD) Reporting Services, that covers major international environmental negotiations and meetings, such as the Convention on International Trade in Endangered Species (CITES). She has also published numerous documents, ranging from Annual Reports to Congress for the United States Treasury Department to government technical reports for USAID and other organizations such as Nature Conservancy, the Environmental Defense Fund, and Rainforest Action Network. She has been published in academic journals including the Journal of Modern African Studies and more popular online venues such as her own blog and other independent sites, including the online conservation publication Mongabay. Neme is the host of the radio program The Wildlife in Burlington, Vermont.

Neme has also written informational picture books. Orangutan Houdini, illustrated by Kathie Kelleher, was published in 2014 by Bunker Hill Publishing. A review of the book in Kirkus Reviews described the work as an "interesting exploration of animal intelligence for budding zoologists". The Elephant's New Shoe (2020) was written with the Wildlife Alliance, illustrated by Ariel Landy, and published by Orchard Books, an imprint of Scholastic. The reviewer for Kirkus Reviews called it a "captivating story".
