= Laurel Braitman =

American historian and writer

Laurel S. Braitman
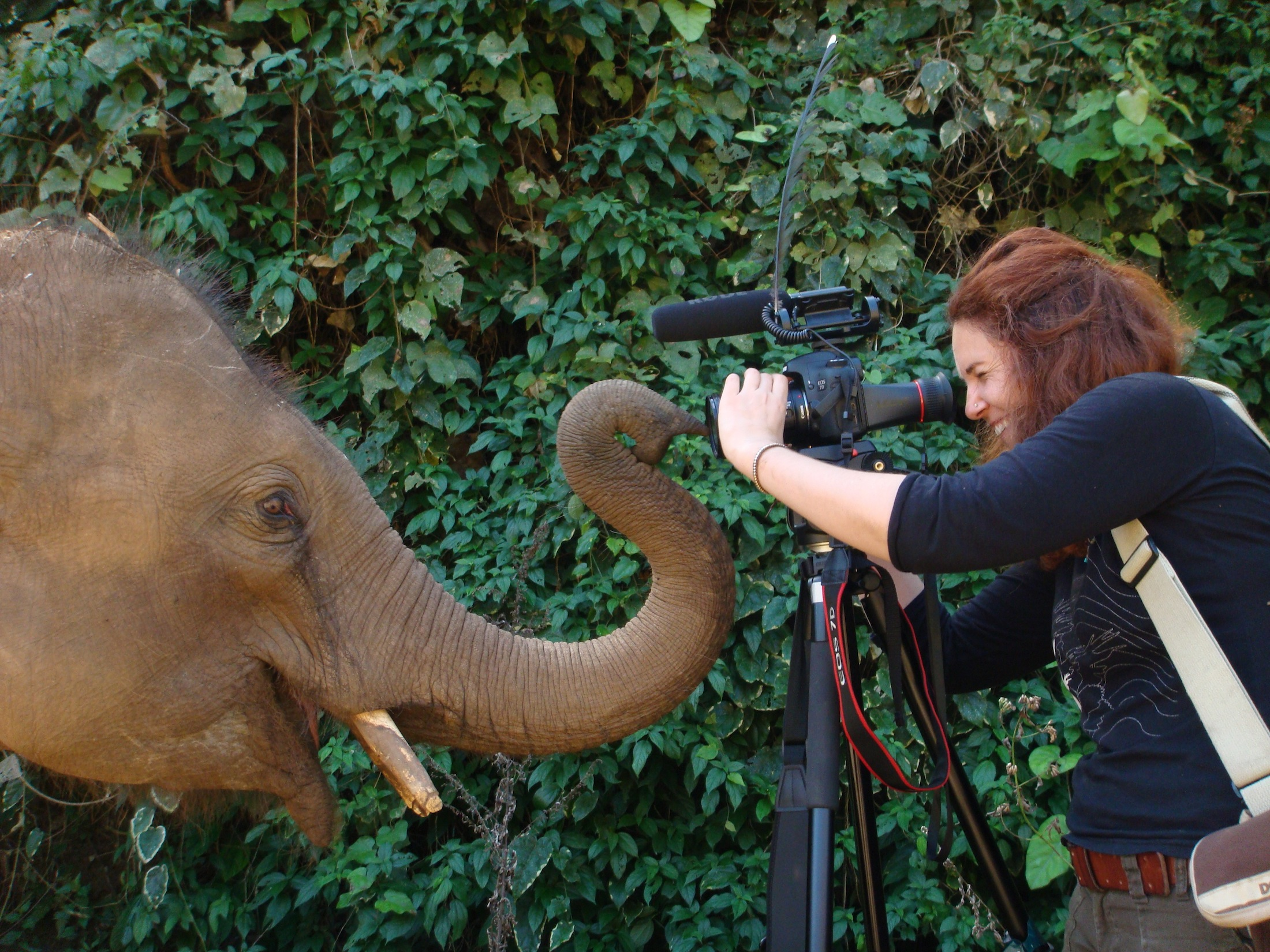
- Photograph of Laurel Braitman provided by Simon & Schuster.
- Born: February 11, 1978 (age 48); United States of America
- Occupation: Writer-in-Residence at Stanford School of Medicine
- Website: animalmadness.com

Laurel S. Braitman (born February 11, 1978) is an American science historian, writer, and a TED Fellow.

She is Writer-in-Residence at the Stanford School of Medicine and a Contributing Writer for Pop Up Magazine. She is also an affiliate artist at the Headlands Center for the Arts. Her work has appeared in The Guardian, The Wall Street Journal, Fast Company, The New Inquiry, Salon, and a variety of other publications.

Laurel frequently collaborates with visual artists and musicians like Black Prairie to create concerts for all-animal audiences, such as wolves.

== Education ==
Braitman was born and raised on a citrus farm near Ventura in southern California. She majored in Biology and Writing at Cornell University, where she was a member of the Quill and Dagger society and graduated summa cum laude. She worked as an intern in the Weekend Edition Saturday program at NPR. She received a John S. Hennessey scholarship to pursue graduate studies at the Massachusetts Institute of Technology, wherein 2013, she received her Ph.D. in the history and anthropology of science. Braitman lives in San Francisco, California.

== Career ==
She is the author of Animal Madness: How Anxious Dogs, Compulsive Parrots, and Elephants in Recovery Help Us Understand Ourselves, which was published in October 2015. In the book, Braitman shows through a wealth of research that nonhuman animals are startlingly similar to us in how they are affected by mental illness, and in what methods best help them recover.

== Bibliography ==
=== Books ===
- Animal Madness: How Anxious Dogs, Compulsive Parrots, and Elephants in Recovery Help Us Understand Ourselves (2015)
- What Looks Like Bravery: An Epic Journey Through Loss to Love (2023)

=== Essays and reporting ===
- "Recognize these dirty birds?". Explore. Birds. National Geographic. 233 (1): 15. January 2018.
