= Valters Āboliņš =

Latvian rogaining competitor and footballer

Medal record

Rogaining

Representing Latvia

World Championships
Silver medal – second place	2008 Karula National Park	XO group

Valters Āboliņš (born 19 December 1985 in Dobele, Latvia) is a Latvian rogaining competitor and former football defender. He won a silver medal in the XO group at the 8th World Rogaining Championship in Karula National Park, Estonia. His teammates were Andris Ansabergs and Mara Leitane. He also spend two years in Latvia Second league football club Hemat.
