= Laurel O'Donnell =

American author

- Occupation: Novelist
- Writing career
- Language: English
- Genre: Romance
- Website: www.laurel-odonnell.com

Laurel O'Donnell is an American author of romance novels.

== Biography ==
Laurel O'Donnell started her writing career with a Golden Heart Competition nomination from the Romance Writers of America for her first medieval romance novel The Angel and the Prince. This book caught the attention of Kensington Books and they signed Laurel to a multi-book deal. She has been nominated for several awards including the Romantic Times Reviewers' Choice Award. Her third novel A Knight of Honor won the Holt Medallion award.

== Awards ==
- 2000 – Holt Medallion Winner for Best Medieval Romance for A Knight of Honor

== Bibliography ==
=== Medieval Novels ===
- The Angel and the Prince (1996)
- The Lady and The Falconer (1998)
- A Knight of Honor (1999)
- Midnight Shadow (2000)
- Champion of the Heart (2001)
- Angel's Assassin (2012)

=== Medieval Novellas ===
- The Bride and the Brute (1998) featured in Blushing Brides

=== Paranormal Romance Novels ===
- Immortal Death (2011)

=== Urban Fantasy ===
- Lost Souls: Resurrection (2011)
- Lost Souls: Imperfection (2012)
