= Laurel Cutler =

American advertising executive (1926–2021)

- Born: December 8, 1926
- Died: November 28, 2021 (aged 94)

Laurel Cutler (December 8, 1926 - November 28, 2021) was an American advertising executive. She was one of the first women to rise to the top in the field of advertising. She was named one of the eleven seminal figures of the 1980s by Fortune, the only women on the list.
