= Edmund Capon =

British-Australian art scholar specialising in Chinese art

Edmund Capon AM, OBE
- Born: 11 June 1940; Sidcup, Kent, England
- Died: 13 March 2019 (aged 78); London, England
- Education: Sutton Valence School; SOAS, University of London; Courtauld Institute of Art
- Occupation: Art historian
- Spouse: Joanna Capon (m. 1977)

Edmund George Capon AM OBE (11 June 1940 – 13 March 2019) was an art scholar specialising in Chinese art. He was director of the Art Gallery of New South Wales from 1978 to 2011. He was also the chair of soccer club Sydney FC from 2006 to 2007.

== Early years and education ==
Capon, born in Sidcup, England in 1940, obtained a Master of Philosophy degree (MPhil) in Chinese art and archaeology (including language) from London University's School of Oriental and African Studies, and also studied 20th-century painting at the Courtauld Institute of Art, London University. From 1973–1978 he held the position of assistant keeper, Far Eastern Section at the Victoria and Albert Museum, having started there in 1966 in the Textile Department.

He married Ann Fairclough.

He was married to Joanna from 1977.

== Australian career ==
=== Art Gallery of New South Wales ===
Capon left London in 1978 to take up an appointment as Director and Chief Curator of the Art Gallery of New South Wales (AGNSW), on the recommendation of the Premier of New South Wales, Neville Wran.

During his tenure as Director, Capon became recognised as a world expert in his particular field and has published several books and catalogues including Princes of jade (1974); Art and archaeology in China (1977); Qin Shihuang: terracotta warriors and horses (1982); and Tang China: vision and splendour of a golden age (1989), as well as many articles for Australian and international newspapers and professional art journals. Under his directorship, the gallery focused more on Asian arts in its acquisitions, including the opening of a new Asian wing in March 2003. In September 2008 the gallery announced that it was making its biggest-ever acquisition, Paul Cézanne's landscape "Bords De La Marne", for $16.2 million to mark Capon's 30th anniversary as Director.

On 10 June 1994 Capon was appointed a Member of the Order of Australia (AM) "in recognition of service to the arts, particularly as Director of the Art Gallery of NSW". In 2000, he was awarded a Doctor of Letters (honoris causa) from the University of New South Wales and a Chevalier of the Ordre des Arts et des Lettres from the French government. On 1 January 2001 he was presented with the Centenary Medal "for service to Australian society and the arts". Capon was also appointed as a "Cavaliere" of the Order of Merit of the Italian Republic. In the 2003 Queen's Birthday Honours, Capon was appointed an Officer of the Order of the British Empire (OBE) by the United Kingdom government "for services to the promotion of British art in Australia". He was also a member of the Advisory Council of the Asia Society AustralAsia Centre, a member of the Council of Australian Art Museum Directors (CAAMD) and an adjunct Professor of the University of New South Wales in Chinese studies.

Capon chose the winner of the Art Gallery Society of NSW prize in the annual Sculpture by the Sea awards. This prize is donated by the Art Gallery and is worth $5000.

In August 2011, Capon announced that he would be retiring as director at the end of 2011, with a Picasso exhibition in October being one of the last major events of his tenure at the AGNSW.

During his 33 years as leader of the institution, Capon helped it to "become one of Sydney's most loved cultural institutions, one that received 1.3 million visitors" in 2010. He became "its public face: ebullient, unorthodox, ready with the pithy quote but erudite, a Mandarin-speaking scholar of Chinese art".

=== Sydney FC ===
A longtime football fan, Capon was a supporter of Chelsea Football Club. In addition, he was a founding board Director of Sydney FC, when it was established in 2004. In September 2006 Capon replaced Walter Bugno as Chairman of Sydney Football Club, a position he held until August 2007, when he resigned owing to increasing responsibilities in his role as Director of the Art Gallery of NSW.

== Later life ==
Following his retirement Capon served as a visiting professor in the School of Languages and Linguistics, Faculty of Arts and Social Sciences, University of New South Wales. Continuing his passion for Asian art, Capon wrote and presented a three-part ABC TV-China Central Television co-produced documentary entitled Meishu: Travels in Chinese Art and his three-part documentary entitled The Art of Australia was co-produced by the BBC and the ABC and premiered in October 2013. In August 2013 Capon's successor as Director of the AGNSW, Michael Brand, announced the establishment of the Edmund Capon Fellowship to act as an exchange program between the Gallery and galleries in China, saying:

"Today we not only acknowledge Edmund Capon for his exemplary work in making Asian art an essential part of the Gallery, but through this fellowship we can now work much more closely with colleagues in the major museums of Asia [...] The fellowship will facilitate an exchange of staff between this Gallery and museums in Asia in key areas such as curatorial work, research, conservation, public programs, education and exhibition management, he said. It will build on the legacy of Edmund Capon, who was the first art museum director in Australia with expertise in the field of Asian art."

In March 2014 Capon was appointed chair of the 4A Centre for Contemporary Asian Art based in Sydney, and in the same year became chair of the Australian Institute of Architects Foundation.

== Death ==
Capon had several skin cancers removed during his later years. In 2018 his melanoma was treated by immunotherapy. Although the treatment removed the cancer, the side effects resulted in his death in London, on 13 March 2019, aged 78, during what was meant to be a short visit, after a long wished-for journey to Central Asia.

== Bibliography ==
- Chinese painting: 64 reproductions
- Gamarada: Friends [photography by Christopher Snee, Jenni Carter & Ray Woodbury]
- With Bruce James, Art Gallery of New South Wales Handbook
- With Liu Yang and James Hayes, Poetic Mandarin: Chinese calligraphy from the James Hayes collection. (Chinese: Huan hai mo yun: Xu Shu cang Zhongguo Qing dai shu fa)
- Art and Archaeology in China
- Chinese tomb figures
- With William MacQuitty, Princes of jade
- Tang China: Vision and splendour of a golden age, photography by Werner Forman
- With Liu Yang, Masks of Mystery: Ancient Chinese bronzes from Sanxingdui (Chinese: Jia mian zhi mi: Sanxingdui chu tu Zhong Guo gu dai qing tong qi)
- I Blame Duchamp: My Life's Adventures in Art. Surry Hills: Lantern. June 2010. p. 385. ISBN 9781920989620.

Cultural offices
| Preceded by Peter Laverty | Director of the Art Gallery of New South Wales; 1978–2011 | Succeeded by Michael Brand |
