= Laurel Kessel =

American volleyball player

Personal information
- Full name: Laurel Keye Brassey Kessel
- Born: February 7, 1954 (age 72)
- Height: 170 cm (5 ft 7 in)
- Education: San Diego State University

Volleyball information
- Position: Setter
- Number: 10

National team
1972–1980, 1987–1988	United States
Honours
Women's volleyball
Representing the United States
Pan American Games
Bronze medal – third place	1987 Indianapolis	Team

Laurel Kessel (born February 7, 1954) is an American former volleyball player. She played volleyball for San Diego's Crawford High School, and then San Diego State University, before joining the United States national team. She appeared in the 1988 Summer Olympics in Seoul. She was a setter.
