= Laurel Lee (disambiguation) =

Laurel Lee (born 1974) is an American lawyer and politician.

Laurel Lee may also refer to:

- Laurel Lea (1942–1992), Australian singer
- Laurel Lea Schaefer (a.k.a. Laurie Lea Schaefer, born 1949), American beauty pageant titleholder
- Laurel Lee (swimmer), Taiwanese swimmer

== See also ==
- Laura Lee (disambiguation)
