= E–The Environmental Magazine =

- January–February 2012 front cover of E–The Environmental Magazine
- Executive Editor: Doug Moss
- Former editors: Brita Belli, Jim Motavalli, Elissa Wolfson
- Categories: Environment, nature, conservation
- Frequency: Bimonthly
- Circulation: 70,000
- Publisher: Doug Moss
- Founder: Doug Moss
- Founded: 1988
- First issue: January 1990
- Company: Earth Action Network, Inc.
- Country: United States
- Based in: Norwalk, Connecticut
- Language: English
- Website: www.emagazine.com
- ISSN: 1046-8021
- OCLC: 476211858

E–The Environmental Magazine, or simply E, is an environmental magazine aimed at a readership concerned about the environment, and those who want to know what they can do to make a difference. It has won and been nominated for 13 Independent Press Awards. In print from 1990-2013, the archive of back issues is now available at emagazine.com, with new editorial content provided by its sister site, EarthTalk.org, the online home of the internationally syndicated EarthTalk Q&A column.

The nonprofit (501-c-3) organization Earth Action Network, Inc. maintains emagazine.com and publishes new content via EarthTalk.org and its network of 1,300+ media outlets across North America.

E: The Environmental Magazine and EarthTalk cover the following areas of interest:

- Air and water quality
- Forests and Waterways
- Biodiversity
- Oceans and fisheries
- Biotechnology
- Human population growth impacts
- Climate change
- Recycling and re-Use
- Endangered wildlife
- Toxic health threats
- Food safety
- Transportation and energy issues
