= Laurel Nannup =

Laurel Nannup is a Noongar artist who was born in Carrolup, in 1943, Western Australia. She is a member of the Stolen Generation. Born into a large family Nannup grew up in the bush around Pinjarra until she was taken at 8 years or age to the Wandering Mission where she lived until she was 16.

Laurel told her story in an art exhibition in 2012 with Art on the Move called A Story to Tell. A book was produced as part of the exhibition also called A Story to Tell.

She completed postgraduate studies at Curtin University of Technology, Perth in 2001 after graduating with a Bachelor of Arts (Fine Arts) in 2000.

She is a printmaker who works in woodcut and etchings. Her art is in the collections of the National Gallery of Australia, Queensland Art Gallery, Art Gallery of Western Australia, Berndt Museum of Anthropology and the Museum of Contemporary Aboriginal Art in the Netherlands.
