= Henry Salkauskas =

Henry Salkauskas (6 May 1925 – 31 August 1979) was an Australian printmaker and abstract artist in watercolors, a refugee from Lithuania.

== History ==
Henrikas Salkauskas was born in Kaunas (aka Kovno), Lithuania, the only child of Henrikas Salkauskas, an army officer, and his wife Ona-Anna Salkauskas, née Sidzikauskas.

He was aged 15 when, in the Soviet occupation Lithuania, his father was among those rounded up and taken away by the Russians, and was never seen again, later found to have died in the Vorkuta concentration camp in Siberia. German occupation followed, then in 1944 when the Russians again took over, Salkauskas and his mother fled to West Germany, settling in Freiburg. Salkauskas studied graphic arts at the University of Freiburg and L'École des Arts et Métiers, and his mother gained medical qualifications.

They applied for resettlement and found their way to Australia, arriving in Melbourne on 31 May 1949 by the Skaugum, a Norwegian liner chartered by the IRO. and Henry (his adopted name) worked under contract for two years at a stone quarry near Canberra. He began to exhibit his linocut prints.

He moved to Sydney in 1951 and went into business as a house painter, an occupation he followed, at least as a sideline for the rest of his life. In the early 1950s he worked for the NSW railways painting railway stations. Having a regular job gave him freedom to experiment with his linocuts and from 1958 silkscreen prints, without the need to create saleable works.

He was in 1953 a founding member of Six Directions, a Sydney art collective of six displaced persons from Eastern Europe.

He was a member (and from 1957 on the committee) of the Sydney branch of the Contemporary Art Society. He won the major prize at their 1967 interstate exhibition at the Argus Gallery, Melbourne. He often worked in black and shades of grey, a reaction, some say, to the treatment of his father and the harsh climate of his homeland. There is also the great tradition of Lithuanian black and white printmaking and the influence of Pierre Soulages and Hans Hartung.

In 1960 he met Eva Kubbos, also born in Lithuania, with similar interests. They worked and exhibited together and were, in 1961, founding members of Sydney Printmakers.

Salkauskas exhibited internationally, at São Paulo, Brazil in 1960; Tokyo in 1960 and 1962; South East Asia in 1962 and Ljubljana, Yugoslavia in 1963.

In 1965 he started working on large abstract paintings in watercolors, a novel approach. In 1963 he joined the Australian Watercolour Institute and created a minor revolution. Around this time he abandoned printmaking.

== Exhibitions ==
Salkauskas's first solo exhibition was mounted at the Macquarie Gallery in 1961. Other exhibitions were held at the Hungry Horse Gallery in 1964, Macquarie Gallery in 1970 and Holdsworth Galleries in 1971. He won prizes at local art competitions and his work was shown at exhibitions in Tokyo, Lugarno (Switzerland), Ljubljana (Yugoslavia) and Washington DC, USA.

== Recognition ==
Salkauskas won over sixty art awards, including the Perth prize in 1963, the Mirror-Waratah Festival prize in 1963, the Maude Vizard-Wholohan Prize (Adelaide) in 1964, and the Mosman Art Prize in 1963, 1964 and 1965. He was the subject of an article in Meanjin, (No.3 of 1961).

He is represented in several State and regional galleries in Australia.

In 1981 the Art Gallery of New South Wales held a retrospective exhibition of his work and, at the instigation of Kubbos, established the Henry Salkauskas Contemporary Art Purchase Fund, endowed by his mother.

== Personal ==
Salkauskas lived at Kirribilli, one of Sydney's most affluent suburbs, from 1954. His mother, Ona-Anna Salkauskas was living at 50 Jeffrey Street Kirribilli when she died on 28 August 1990.

He never married.
