= Sant'Ilario d'Enza =

Sant'Ilario d'Enza Sant'Ilâri (Emilian)
- Comune
- Comune di Sant'Ilario d'Enza
- Coat of arms

- Location within Italy Location within Emilia-Romagna
- Coordinates: 44°46′N 10°27′E
- Country: Italy
- Region: Emilia-Romagna
- Province: Reggio Emilia (RE)
- Frazioni: Cabianca, Calerno, Case Paterlini, Case Via Sabotino, Case Zinani, Castellana, Chiavicone, Ghiara, Partitore, Rampa d'Enza, Villa Spalletti

Government
  - Mayor: Marcello Moretti

Area
  - Total: 20.2 km^{2} (7.8 sq mi)

Population (31 December 2016)
  - Total: 11,261
  - Density: 557/km^{2} (1,440/sq mi)
- Demonym: Santilariesi
- Time zone: UTC+1 (CET)
  - Summer (DST): UTC+2 (CEST)
- Postal code: 42049
- Dialing code: 0522
- Patron saint: Eulalia of Mérida
- Saint day: February 12
- Website: Official website

Sant'Ilario d'Enza ("Saint Hilarius on the Enza"; Reggiano: Sant'Ilâri) is a comune (municipality) in the Province of Reggio Emilia in the Italian region of Emilia-Romagna, located about 80 kilometres (50 mi) northwest of Bologna and about 15 kilometres (9 mi) northwest of Reggio Emilia.

Sant'Ilario d'Enza borders the following municipalities: Campegine, Gattatico, Montecchio Emilia, Montechiarugolo, Parma, Reggio Emilia.

== Twin towns ==
Sant'Ilario d'Enza is twinned with:

- Melissa, Italy
- Zierenberg, Germany
