= Lists of artists =

Lists of artists, in the sense of people engaged in the visual arts, include lists by nationality, by location, by discipline, by period, by associated movement, by subject and by contribution.

== By nationality ==
- Algerian artists
- American artists
- Armenian artists
- Australian artists
- Austrian artists
- Azerbaijani artists
- Bangladeshi artists
- Barbadian artists
- Belarusian artists
- Belgian painters
- Bosnian painters
- Brazilian artists
- British artists
- Bulgarian artists
- Burmese visual artists
- Cambodian artists
- Cameroonian artists
- Canadian artists
- Chilean artists
- Chinese artists
- Colombian artists
- Croatian artists
- Cuban artists
- Cypriot painters
- Czech artists
- Dominican Republic artists
- Dutch artists
- Ecuadorian artists
- Egyptian artists
- Emirati artists
- French artists
- German artists
- Georgian painters
- Greek artists
- Greenlandic artists
- Guyanese artists
- Haitian artists
- Icelandic painters
- Indian artists
- Indonesian artists
- Iranian artists
- Iraqi artists
- Irish artists
- Isle of Man artists
- Israeli visual artists
- Italian artists
- Jamaican artists
- Japanese artists
- Kazakh artists
- Kenyan artists
- Korean painters
- Kuwaiti artists
- Latvian artists
- Lebanese artists
- Lithuanian artists
- Luxembourg artists
- Macedonian artists
- Maltese artists
- Malaysian artists
- Mexican artists
- Moldovan artists
- Mongolian artists
- New Zealand artists
- Northern Irish artists
- Norwegian artists
- Pakistani artists
- Peruvian artists
- Polish artists
- Portuguese artists
- Russian artists
- Saudi Arabian artists
- Scottish artists
- Senegalese artists
- Serbian artists
- Slovak painters
- Slovenian artists
- Spanish artists
- South African artists
- Syrian artists
- Swedish artists
- Taiwanese artists
- Trinidad and Tobago artists
- Turkish artists
- Ukrainian artists
- Uruguayan artists
- Venezuelan artists
- Welsh artists
- Yemeni artists
- Zambian artists
- Zimbabwean artists

== By location ==
- Aberdeen Artists Society
- Amsterdamse Joffers
- Boston Watercolor Club
- Brooklyn artists
- California Art Club
- Early Netherlandish painters
- Glasgow Society of Lady Artists
- Guernsey artists
- Water Colour Society of Ireland
- Art Students League of Los Angeles
- Maine painters
- Milanese painters
- New England Watercolor Society
- New Rochelle, New York artists
- Art Students League of New York
- New Zealand designers and artisans
- Ontario Society of Artists
- Portland, Oregon artists
- San Pedro, California artists
- Scandinavian textile artists
- Utah artists
- Venice painters and architects

== By discipline ==
- List of animators
- List of avant-garde artists
- List of calligraphers
- List of caricaturists
- List of cartoonists
- List of comics creators
- List of fashion designers
- List of female comics creators
- List of filmmakers
- List of footwear designers
- List of furniture designers
- List of glass artists
- List of grand couturiers
- List of graphic designers
- List of illustrators
- List of industrial designers
- List of interactive artists
- List of jewellery designers
- List of manga artists
- List of mathematical artists
- List of medallists
- List of minicomics creators
- List of minimalist artists
- List of mixed media artists
- List of modern artists
- List of new media artists
- List of Op artists
- List of Orientalist artists
- List of origamists
- List of painters
- List of performance artists
- List of photographers
- List of postminimalist artists
- List of pin-up artists
- List of photojournalists
- List of poster artists
- List of printmakers
- List of quilters
- List of role-playing game artists
- List of sculptors
- List of sound artists
- List of stencil artists
- List of stop motion artists
- List of street artists
- List of street photographers
- List of Stuckist artists
- List of studio potters
- List of tattoo artists
- List of type designers
- List of video artists
- List of watchmakers
- List of webcomic creators
- List of women photographers
- List of woodcarvers

== By period ==
- Artists of the Tudor court
- List of 18th-century British children's literature illustrators
- List of 19th-century British children's literature illustrators
- List of early-20th-century British children's literature illustrators
- List of 19th-century Russian painters
- List of 20th-century Russian painters
- List of American artists before 1900
- List of American artists 1900 and after
- List of contemporary artists
- List of Federal Art Projects artists
- List of Gothic artists
- List of Greek vase painters
- List of feminist avant-garde artists of the 1970s
- List of modern artists
- List of Romanesque artists
- List of Stone Age art

== By associated movement ==
- British Surrealist Group
- List of Dadaists
- List of feminist artists
- List of French artistic movements
- List of Hudson River School artists
- List of Indigenous Australian art movements and cooperatives
- List of Nihonga painters
- List of Orientalist artists
- List of Russian Avant-Garde artists
- List of Yōga painters
- Lyrical abstraction
- Women surrealists
- Young British Artists

== By teacher ==
- Students of Thomas Eakins
- List of Carlo Maratta pupils and assistants
- List of pupils of Jean-Léon Gérôme
- List of Rembrandt pupils
- List of Utagawa school members

== By alma mater ==
- ArtCenter College of Design people
- Byam Shaw School of Art alumni
- California College of the Arts people
- Courtauld Institute of Art alumni
- Julian Ashton Art School alumni
- Royal College of Art alumni
- Sir Jamsetjee Jeejebhoy School of Art alumni
- Rhode Island School of Design people
- San Francisco Art Institute people
- School of the Art Institute of Chicago people
- Slade School of Fine Art alumni
- St. Martin's School of Art alumni

== By subject ==
- List of American botanical illustrators
- List of Australian botanical illustrators
- List of Australian street artists
- List of BDSM artists
- List of BDSM photographers
- List of fetish artists
- List of Glitch Artists
- List of artists who painted Hawaii and its people
- List of artists who made prints of Hawaii and its people
- List of artists who sculpted Hawaii and its people
- List of Irish botanical illustrators
- List of mathematical artists
- List of photographers of the civil rights movement
- List of science fiction and fantasy artists
- List of Soviet poster artists
- List of space artists
- List of wildlife artists

== By contribution ==
- List of artists in the Armory Show
- List of artists in the Web Gallery of Art
- List of notable artists who have exhibited in Artomatic
- List of artists in the collection of the Mauritshuis
- List of artists who have created a Château Mouton Rothschild label
- List of artists from the MNAC collection
- List of artists in the Leuchtenberg Gallery
- List of artworks on stamps of the United States
- List of painters in the Art Institute of Chicago
- List of painters in the Los Angeles County Museum of Art collections
- List of painters in the National Gallery of Art
- List of painters in the Pinakothek
- List of painters in the collection of the Rijksmuseum
- List of painters of Saint Petersburg Union of Artists
- List of Académie des Beaux-Arts members: Painting
- List of New Museum Triennial Artists
- List of Vanity Fair artists
- List of artists represented in the National Museum of Western Art, Tokyo
- List of artists who created paintings and drawings for use in films
- List of members of the American Academy of Arts and Letters Department of Art
- American Academy of Arts and Letters
- Biennial of Hawaii Artists
- List of New Museum Triennial Artists
- Folio Society
- Art collection of Fondazione Cariplo
- Art collection of Fondazione Cassa di Risparmio di Cesena
- Art collection of Fondazione Cassa di Risparmio di Lucca
- Art collection of Fondazione Cassa di Risparmio di Perugia
- Art collection of Fondazione Manodori
- Catalog of paintings in the Louvre Museum
- Catalog of paintings in the National Gallery, London
- List of paintings on Soviet postage stamps
- List of artists who painted United States post office murals
- List of Lynx public art artists

== By exhibition ==
- List of women artists exhibited at the 1893 World's Columbian Exposition
- List of American painters exhibited at the 1893 World's Columbian Exposition
- List of American sculptors exhibited at the 1893 World's Columbian Exposition
- List of Whitney Biennial artists
- Catalog of Still life paintings from the Netherlands, 1550–1720
- Catalog of Pride and Joy: Children's Portraits in the Netherlands, 1500–1700
- Women Artists: 1550–1950

== By franchise ==
- List of Magic: The Gathering artists
- List of Star Wars artists

== By award ==
- Abd-el-Tif prize
- List of fellows of the American Academy in Rome 1896–1970
- List of fellows of the American Academy in Rome 1971–1990
- List of fellows of the American Academy in Rome 1991–2010
- List of fellows of the American Academy in Rome 2011–present
- List of Archibald Prize 1921 finalists
- List of Archibald Prize 1922 finalists
- List of Archibald Prize 1923 finalists
- List of Archibald Prize 1938 finalists
- List of Archibald Prize 1946 finalists
- List of Archibald Prize 1960 finalists
- List of Archibald Prize 1973 finalists
- List of Archibald Prize 1986 finalists
- List of Archibald Prize 1990 finalists
- List of Archibald Prize 1993 finalists
- List of Archibald Prize 1994 finalists
- List of Archibald Prize 1995 finalists
- List of Archibald Prize 1996 finalists
- List of Archibald Prize 1997 finalists
- List of Archibald Prize 1998 finalists
- List of Archibald Prize 1999 finalists
- List of Archibald Prize 2000 finalists
- List of Archibald Prize 2001 finalists
- List of Archibald Prize 2002 finalists
- List of Archibald Prize 2003 finalists
- List of Archibald Prize 2004 finalists
- List of Archibald Prize 2005 finalists
- List of Archibald Prize 2006 finalists
- List of Archibald Prize 2007 finalists
- List of Archibald Prize 2008 finalists
- List of Archibald Prize 2009 finalists
- List of Archibald Prize 2010 finalists
- List of Archibald Prize 2011 finalists
- List of Archibald Prize 2012 finalists
- List of Archibald Prize 2013 finalists
- List of Archibald Prize 2014 finalists
- List of Archibald Prize 2015 finalists
- List of Archibald Prize 2016 finalists
- List of Archibald Prize 2017 finalists
- List of Archibald Prize 2018 finalists
- List of Archibald Prize 2019 finalists
- List of Archibald Prize winners
- Lists of Archibald Prize finalists
- Anne Gould Hauberg Artist Images Award
- Ars Fennica Award
- Art Prize of the German Democratic Republic
- Bennett Prize for Women Figurative Realists
- Bonnie Bronson Fellowship
- Carnegie Prize
- Catharine E. B. Cox Award for Excellence in the Visual Arts
- Cherry Kearton Medal and Award
- Chesley Awards
- Cologne Fine Art Award
- Cresson Traveling Scholarship
- Leonardo da Vinci World Award of Arts
- Dorothea von Stetten Art Award
- Prix Fénéon
- Future Generation Art Prize
- Prix Godecharle
- Guggenheim International Award
- List of Hallgarten Prize-winning painters
- Imke Folkerts Prize for Fine Arts
- Jindřich Chalupecký Award
- Kazimierz Ostrowski Award
- List of Laureates of the Governor General's Award in Visual and Media Arts
- List of Lulu Award winners
- Logan Medal of the Arts
- National Prize for Plastic Arts (Chile)
- National Award for Plastic Arts (Spain)
- List of NATSIAA award winners
- List of Olympic medalists in art competitions
- Ordway Prize
- Prince Eugen Medal
- Prix Blumenthal
- Prix de Rome (Belgium)
- Prix Fondation d'entreprise Ricard
- Prix Grand-Duc Adolphe
- Sheikha Manal's Young Artist Award
- Szpilman Award
- Temple Gold Medal
- William Hodges Fellowship
- Women's Caucus for Art Lifetime Achievement Award
- World Fantasy Award—Artist
- Wynn Newhouse Award

== By book ==
- 120 Paintings from the Rijksmuseum
- Artists in biographies by Giovanni Baglione
- Artists in biographies by Filippo Baldinucci
- Benezit Dictionary of Artists
- English Female Artists
- The Great Theatre of Dutch Painters
- Great Women Masters of Art
- Het Gulden Cabinet
- Invisible Women: Forgotten Artists of Florence
- Lives of Flemish, German, and Dutch painters
- Lives of the Most Excellent Painters, Sculptors, and Architects
- List of artists in the Metropolitan Museum of Art Guide
- List of artists in the Philadelphia Museum of Art handbook of the collections
- Schilder-boeck
- An account of the lives and works of the most eminent Spanish painters, sculptors and architects
- Roger de Piles' artists from France
- Roger de Piles' artists from Germany and the Low Countries
- Roger de Piles' artists from Lombardy
- Teutsche Academie
- Geschiedenis der Vaderlandsche Schilderkunst
- Lives of the Most Excellent Painters, Sculptors, and Architects
- The Lives of Dutch painters and paintresses

== By organization ==
- Société des Artistes Français
- List of members of Aosdána
- Berlin Secession
- List of artists associated with The London Group
- List of presidents of The London Group
- List of members of the Académie Royale de Peinture et de Sculpture
- National Association of Women Artists
- National Cartoonist Society
- National Society of Mural Painters
- Royal Birmingham Society of Artists
- Royal Institute of Painters in Water Colours
- List of painters of Saint Petersburg Union of Artists
- Vienna Secession

== Other ==
- African-American architects
- List of African-American visual artists
- List of American architects
- Arti et Amicitiae
- List of artists featured on the show 100 Great Paintings
- List of artists who created paintings and drawings for use in films
- List of Black British artists
- List of Canadian women artists
- List of Catholic artists
- List of centenarians (artists, painters and sculptors)
- List of English women artists
- List of French stained glass manufacturers
- List of Indigenous Australian visual artists
- List of Jewish American cartoonists
- List of Korean ceramic artists and sculptors
- List of Latin American artists
- List of LGBT artists
- List of Muslim painters
- List of Native American artists
- List of Native American artists from Oklahoma
- List of Native American women artists
- List of outsider artists
- List of painters by name
- List of Russian landscape painters
- List of Scottish women artists
- List of women artists from Bangladesh
- Lists of women artists
- List of Azerbaijani sculptors
- List of Croatian sculptors
- List of Danish sculptors
- List of Hungarian sculptors
- List of Latvian sculptors
- List of Polish sculptors
- List of Slovenian sculptors
- List of Scandinavian textile artists
- List of women botanical illustrators

== See also ==
- Lists of painters by nationality
