= Trzebinski =

Trzebinski or Trzebiński (feminine: Trzebińska, plural: Trzebińscy) is a Polish surname. Notable people with the surname include:

- Alfred Trzebinski (1902–1946), German SS-physician at several Nazi concentration camps executed for war crimes
- Andrzej Trzebiński (1922–1943), Polish poet
- Errol Trzebinski (born 1936), British author, mother of Gabriela Trzebinski
- Gabriela Trzebinski (born 1962), Kenyan-American artist, daughter of Errol Trzebinski
