= List of San Pedro artists =

Works by artists from San Pedro, California, United States, are found in museums and galleries around the world.

- Elmer Albert Batters (1919–1997): fashion and glamour photographer
- Ray Carofano (born 1942): photographer and curator; his work has been exhibited in over 60 galleries and museums, and in photography books and journals in the US and abroad; has lectured and taught workshops at various colleges and universities
- Misty Copeland (born 1982): one of the first African-American female soloists with the American Ballet Theatre; has been described as the muse of popular musician Prince
- Eugene L. Daub (born 1942): contemporary figure sculptor; sculptor of the statue of Rosa Parks installed in the US Capitol building in 2013; attended and taught at the Pennsylvania Academy of the Fine Arts in Philadelphia, and taught there; instructor at the Scottsdale Artists' School; designer of the first Philadelphia Liberty Medal, awarded every year to a champion of world peace
- Eric Johnson (born 1949): sculptor. His composite resin and wood sculptures have been described as "sleek and smart"; they "curve and blossom, pulse and torque, mimicking the geometries underlying space, time and forms of life."
- Ron Linden (born 1940): abstract painter, independent curator, and college art instructor; lives and works in San Pedro
- Jay McCafferty (born 1948): creates art through a process of solar burning; has a massive body of work with exhibitions in museums and galleries across the U.S.
- Jay Meuser (1911–1963): painter who lived in San Pedro from 1944; a bronze plaque in his honor is mounted on a building in the heart of the art gallery district at 343 West Seventh Street
- Mister Cartoon (Mark Machado) (born 1970): Mexican-American artist of designs, sneakers, tattoos, Joker Brand clothing, album covers, video game atmospheres, and public works
- Scott Stantis (born 1959): editorial cartoonist for the Chicago Tribune and USA Today; created the comic strips The Buckets and Prickly City; resided in San Pedro 1977-1986
- Michael Jelenic (born 1977): American animator, Co-creator of Teen Titans Go!
- Allan Sekula (1951–2013): photographer, writer, filmmaker, theorist and critic.
