= List of artists in the Philadelphia Museum of Art handbook of the collections =

The List of artists in the Philadelphia Museum of Art handbook of the collections is a list of the artists indexed in the Philadelphia Museum of Art museum guide. The guide, with an introduction by Anne D'Harnencourt, was produced as a 25th anniversary gift by the Museum Associates in 1995. The museum's collections are spread throughout several locations in Fairmount Park in addition to The Rodin museum and the Neo-classical building at the end of the Benjamin Franklin Parkway. The entire collection houses over 70,000 objects, thousands of which are on view at any given time. The museum guide has been designed to highlight seven major sections. In the following list, the artist's name is followed by the location of one of their works and its page number in the guide. For artists with more than one work in the collection, or for works by artists not listed here, see the Philadelphia Museum of Art website or the corresponding Wikimedia Commons category. Of artists listed, only 9 are women. For the complete list of artists and their artworks in the collection, see the website.

- Alvar Aalto (1898-1976), European decorative arts and Arms & Armour : page 156
- Robert Adam (1728–1792), European decorative arts and Arms & Armour : page 143
- Ansel Adams (1902-1984), Prints, Drawings, and Photographs : page 247
- Adriano Fiorentino (ca. 1455–1499), European decorative arts and Arms & Armour : page 116
- Thomas Affleck (1740-1795), American Art : page 260
- Washington Allston (1779–1843), American Art : page 268
- Lawrence Alma-Tadema (1836–1912), European Painting and Sculpture : page 199
- Joseph Anthony Jr. (1762-1814), American Art : page 266
- Alexander Porfyrovych Archipenko (1887–1964), Twentieth-century Art : page 311
- Charles Aubry (1803-1883), Prints, Drawings, and Photographs : page 225
- Joseph B. Barry (1757-1838), American Art : page 275
- Pompeo Batoni (1708–1787), European Painting and Sculpture : page 182, 221
- Max Beckmann (1884–1950), Prints, Drawings, and Photographs : page 240
- Benedetto di Bindo (1380/1385-1417), European Painting and Sculpture : page 162
- Benjamin Bergey, American Art : page 273
- Christoffel van den Berghe (1590–1638), European Painting and Sculpture : page 173
- Antoine Berjon (1754–1843), European Painting and Sculpture : page 186
- John Bieber, American Art : page 264
- William Blake (1757–1827), Prints, Drawings, and Photographs : page 223
- Bill Blass (1922-2002), Costume and Textiles : page 101
- David Bomberg (1890–1957), Prints, Drawings, and Photographs : page 235
- Gerard ter Borch (1617–1681), European Painting and Sculpture : page 177
- Michael Botta, European decorative arts and Arms & Armour : page 131
- Dieric Bouts (1415–1475), European Painting and Sculpture : page 166
- Constantin Brâncuși (1876-1957), Twentieth-century Art : page 314, 320
- Jean Brandely, American Art : page 274
- Georges Braque (1882–1963), Prints, Drawings, and Photographs : page 237
- Bronzino (1503–1572), European Painting and Sculpture : page 170
- Edward Burne-Jones (1833–1898), Prints, Drawings, and Photographs : page 227
- Giuseppe Cades (1750–1799), Prints, Drawings, and Photographs : page 222
- Alexander Calder (1898–1976), Twentieth-century Art : page 337
- Julia Margaret Cameron (1815-1879), Prints, Drawings, and Photographs : page 228
- Arthur B. Carles (1882–1952), Twentieth-century Art : page 319
- Martin Carlin (ca. 1730–1785), European decorative arts and Arms & Armour : page 147
- Jean-Baptiste Carpeaux (1827–1875), European Painting and Sculpture : page 190
- Mary Cassatt (1844–1926), American Art : page 289
- Giovanni Benedetto Castiglione (1609–1664), Prints, Drawings, and Photographs : page 218
- Paul Cézanne (1839–1906), European Painting and Sculpture : page 208, 211, 230
- Marc Chagall (1887–1985), Twentieth-century Art : page 306
- Jean-Baptiste-Siméon Chardin (1699–1779), European Painting and Sculpture : page 180
- Eduard Charlemont (1848-1906), European Painting and Sculpture : page 198
- Simon Chaudron (1758-1846), American Art : page 271
- Thomas Chippendale (1718-1779), European decorative arts and Arms & Armour : page 139
- Giorgio de Chirico (1888–1978), Twentieth-century Art : page 309
- Giovanni Battista Cipriani (1727-1785), European decorative arts and Arms & Armour : page 143
- Francesco Clemente (b.1952), Twentieth-century Art : page 338
- Joos van Cleve (1485–1541), European Painting and Sculpture : page 170
- Clodion (1738–1814), European decorative arts and Arms & Armour : page 144
- Chuck Close (b.1940), Twentieth-century Art : page 342
- Charles-Nicolas Cochin (1688–1754), Prints, Drawings, and Photographs : page 221
- Comans-La Planche manufactory, European decorative arts and Arms & Armour : page 130
- John Constable (1776–1837), European Painting and Sculpture : page 187
- Samuel Cooper (1609–1672), European Painting and Sculpture : page 178
- Dirck Volckertszoon Coornhert (1522–1590), European decorative arts and Arms & Armour : page 128
- Jean-Baptiste-Camille Corot (1796–1875), European Painting and Sculpture : page 188
- Gustave Courbet (1819–1877), European Painting and Sculpture : page 192
- Charles-Antoine Coypel (1694–1752), European decorative arts and Arms & Armour : page 145
- Noël-Nicolas Coypel (1690–1734), European Painting and Sculpture : page 179
- Carlo Crivelli (1430/35–1495), European Painting and Sculpture : page 166
- Salvador Dalí (1904–1989), Twentieth-century Art : page 323
- Gerard David (1460–1523), European Painting and Sculpture : page 165
- Thomas J. Davies (active 1862–1870), American Art : page 285
- Edgar Degas (1834–1917), European Painting and Sculpture : page 195, 204, 231
- Willem de Kooning (1904–1997), Twentieth-century Art : page 326
- Eugène Delacroix (1798–1863), European Painting and Sculpture : page 190
- Charles Demuth (1883–1935), Prints, Drawings, and Photographs : page 239
- Dentzel Carousel Co., American Art : page 296
- Derby porcelain, European decorative arts and Arms & Armour : page 141
- Jules Desfossé (1816-1890), European decorative arts and Arms & Armour : page 152
- Desiderio da Settignano (1428–1464), European decorative arts and Arms & Armour : page 115
- Mark di Suvero (b. 1933), Twentieth-century Art : page 336
- Christian Dorflinger (1828–1915), American Art : page 287
- Brothers Dosso (1469–1542), European Painting and Sculpture : page 171
- Marcel Duchamp (1887–1968), Twentieth-century Art : page 307, 316, 317
- Raymond Duchamp-Villon (1876-1918), Twentieth-century Art : page 314
- Raoul Dufy (1877–1953), Costume and Textiles : page 99
- Thomas Eakins (1844–1916), American Art : page 228, 285, 287, 292
- Wharton Esherick (1887-1970), American Art : page 298
- Frederick H. Evans (1853-1943), Prints, Drawings, and Photographs : page 233
- Jan van Eyck (1370–1441), European Painting and Sculpture : page 164
- Jean-Jacques Feuchère (1807-1852), European decorative arts and Arms & Armour : page 154
- Jacobus Fiamengo, European decorative arts and Arms & Armour : page 128
- Alexander Fisher (painter) (1864–1936), Costume and Textiles : page 95
- John Flaxman (1755–1826), European decorative arts and Arms & Armour : page 148
- Jean Jacques Flipart (1724–1793), Prints, Drawings, and Photographs : page 221
- Orazio Fontana (1510-1571), European decorative arts and Arms & Armour : page 122
- Manuel Joachim de Franca (1808–1865), American Art : page 274
- P.H. Emile Froment-Meurice (1802-1855), European decorative arts and Arms & Armour : page 154
- Frank Furness (1839-1912), American Art : page 284
- Thomas Gainsborough (1727–1788), European Painting and Sculpture : page 183
- Émile Gallé (1846-1904), European decorative arts and Arms & Armour : page 155
- Paul Gauguin (1848–1903), European Painting and Sculpture : page 208
- Jacques-Fabien Gautier-Dagoty (1716–1785), Prints, Drawings, and Photographs : page 219
- François-Thomas Germain (1726–1791), European decorative arts and Arms & Armour : page 141
- Giorgio Ghisi (1520–1582), Prints, Drawings, and Photographs : page 217
- Teodoro Ghisi (1536-1601), Prints, Drawings, and Photographs : page 217
- Giovanni di Paolo (1403–1482), European Painting and Sculpture : page 164
- François Girardon (1628–1715), European decorative arts and Arms & Armour : page 136
- Girolamo da Treviso the Younger (ca. 1497–1544), European decorative arts and Arms & Armour : page 121
- Gobelins Manufactory, European decorative arts and Arms & Armour : page 145
- Vincent van Gogh (1853–1890), European Painting and Sculpture : page 203, 207
- Hendrik Goltzius (1558–1617), European Painting and Sculpture : page 172, 218
- Sidney Goodman (1936-2013), Twentieth-century Art : page 339
- Pierre Gouthière (1732–1813), European decorative arts and Arms & Armour : page 146
- Juan Gris (1887–1927), Twentieth-century Art : page 313
- Benjamin Harbeson, American Art : page 259
- Marsden Hartley (1877–1943), Twentieth-century Art : page 311
- Maarten van Heemskerck (1498–1574), European decorative arts and Arms & Armour : page 128
- Lorenz Helmschmid (1449-1514), European decorative arts and Arms & Armour : page 119
- Herculaneum pottery, European decorative arts and Arms & Armour : page 150
- Albert Herter (1871–1950), American Art : page 288
- Eva Hesse (1936-1970), Twentieth-century Art : page 335
- John Hewson (artist) (1744–1821), Costume and Textiles : page 86
- Edward Hicks (1780–1849), American Art : page 281
- Peter Holl III, American Art : page 265
- Josef Hoffmann (1870-1956), Special Collections : page 464
- Winslow Homer (1836–1910), American Art : page 291
- Hon'ami Koetsu (1558-1637), Asian art : page 43, 44
- Hsia Ch'ang (1388-1470), Asian art : page 29
- Xu Wei (1521-1593), Asian art : page 31
- Christian Huber (b. 1984), American Art : page 265
- Richard Humphreys (philanthropist) (1750–1832), American Art : page 262
- Huonekalu-ja Rakennustyötehdas Oy, European decorative arts and Arms & Armour : page 156
- Ike no Taiga (1723-1776), Asian art : page 46
- Jean-Auguste-Dominique Ingres (1780–1867), European Painting and Sculpture : page 185
- George Washington Jack (1855-1931), European decorative arts and Arms & Armour : page 151
- François-Honoré-Georges Jacob-Desmalter (1770–1841), European decorative arts and Arms & Armour : page 149
- Georges Jacob (1739–1814), European decorative arts and Arms & Armour : page 149
- Jacob-Desmalter (1770-1841), European decorative arts and Arms & Armour : page 149
- Jean de Court (1555–1585), European decorative arts and Arms & Armour : page 126
- Jasper Johns (b.1930), Prints, Drawings, and Photographs : page 250, 335
- Thomas Johnson (designer) (1714–1778), European decorative arts and Arms & Armour : page 140
- Johann Joachim Kändler (1706-1775), European decorative arts and Arms & Armour : page 137
- Wassily Kandinsky (1866–1944), Twentieth-century Art : page 312
- Eliza M. Kandle (1822-1892), Costume and Textiles : page 90
- Kano Hogai (1828-1888), Asian art : page 47
- Kitagawa Utamaro (1753-1806), Prints, Drawings, and Photographs : page 225
- Paul Klee (1879–1940), Prints, Drawings, and Photographs : page 245, 321
- Yves Klein (1928-1962), Twentieth-century Art : page 332
- Franz Kline (1910–1962), Twentieth-century Art : page 333
- Knoll International, American Art : page 300
- Gaston Lachaise (1882–1935), Twentieth-century Art : page 309
- John La Farge (1835–1910), American Art : page 297
- Paul de Lamerie (1688-1751), European decorative arts and Arms & Armour : page 139
- Sir Edwin Henry Landseer (1802–1873), European Painting and Sculpture : page 188
- Benjamin Henry Latrobe (1764-1820), American Art : page 269
- Hippolyte Le Bas (1782-1867), Costume and Textiles : page 90
- Fernand Léger (1881–1955), Twentieth-century Art : page 315
- Charles Le Roux (1814-1895), American Art : page 256
- Karl Friedrich Lessing (1808–1880), European Painting and Sculpture : page 186
- Sol LeWitt (1928-2007), Twentieth-century Art : page 343
- Lucas van Leyden (1494–1533), Prints, Drawings, and Photographs : page 216
- Liberty & Co., Costume and Textiles : page 96
- Josse Lieferinxe (1493–1508), European Painting and Sculpture : page 169
- Jacques Lipchitz (1891–1973), Twentieth-century Art : page 330
- El Lissitzky (1890-1941), Prints, Drawings, and Photographs : page 240
- Richard Long (artist) (b.1945), Prints, Drawings, and Photographs : page 251
- José Delores Lopez (1868-1937), American Art : page 299
- Pietro Lorenzetti (1280–1348), European Painting and Sculpture : page 162
- Filippe Maecht, European decorative arts and Arms & Armour : page 130
- Man Ray (1890–1976), Prints, Drawings, and Photographs : page 241
- Édouard Manet (1832–1883), European Painting and Sculpture : page 193, 194
- Marcello (Duchesse de Castiglione-Colonna) (1836-1879), European Painting and Sculpture : page 194
- John Marin (1870–1953), Prints, Drawings, and Photographs : page 235
- Masaccio (1401–1428), European Painting and Sculpture : page 163
- Masolino da Panicale (1383–1447), European Painting and Sculpture : page 163
- Alice Trumbull Mason (1904-1971), Twentieth-century Art : page 326
- Henri Matisse (1869–1954), European Painting and Sculpture : page 310, 325
- Anton Mauve (1838–1888), European Painting and Sculpture : page 201
- Meissen porcelain, European decorative arts and Arms & Armour : page 137
- Memphis Group, European decorative arts and Arms & Armour : page 157
- Ray K. Metzker (1931-2014), Prints, Drawings, and Photographs : page 248
- Clodion (1738–1814), European decorative arts and Arms & Armour : page 144
- Sigisbert Michel (1728-1811), European decorative arts and Arms & Armour : page 148
- Jean-François Millet (1814–1875), European Painting and Sculpture : page 197
- Mintons Ltd., European decorative arts and Arms & Armour : page 153
- Joan Miró (1893–1983), Prints, Drawings, and Photographs : page 244, 321
- Issey Miyake (b. 1938), Costume and Textiles : page 102
- Amedeo Modigliani (1884–1920), Twentieth-century Art : page 319
- Piet Mondrian (1872–1944), Twentieth-century Art : page 317
- Claude Monet (1840–1926), European Painting and Sculpture : page 196, 209
- Thomas Moran (1837–1926), American Art : page 290
- James Morisset (1780-1852), European decorative arts and Arms & Armour : page 146
- Morris & Co., European decorative arts and Arms & Armour : page 151
- Robert Motherwell (1915–1991), Prints, Drawings, and Photographs : page 247
- Edouard Muller (painter) (1823–1876), European decorative arts and Arms & Armour : page 152
- Munakata Shiko (1903-1975), Asian art : page 47
- Elizabeth Murray (artist) (1940–2007), Twentieth-century Art : page 341
- Jacques Neilson (1714-1788), European decorative arts and Arms & Armour : page 145
- Violet Oakley (1874-1961), Prints, Drawings, and Photographs : page 238
- Ōgi Rodō (1863–1941), Asian art : page 48
- Ohio Valley China Co., American Art : page 291
- Georgia O'Keeffe (1887–1986), Twentieth-century Art : page 329
- Claes Oldenburg (b. 1929), Twentieth-century Art : page 338
- Orosius master, Prints, Drawings, and Photographs : page 216
- Daniel Pabst (1826-1910), American Art : page 284
- Elie Pacot (1657-1721), European decorative arts and Arms & Armour : page 135
- Maxfield Parrish (1870-1966), Prints, Drawings, and Photographs : page 232
- Joachim Patinir (1480–1524), European Painting and Sculpture : page 168
- Charles Willson Peale (1741–1827), American Art : page 261, 267
- Anton Peffenhauser (1525-1603), European decorative arts and Arms & Armour : page 126
- Joseph Perfetti, European decorative arts and Arms & Armour : page 143
- Pablo Picasso (1881–1973), Prints, Drawings, and Photographs : page 236, 245, 306, 308, 318
- Horace Pippin (1888–1946), Twentieth-century Art : page 329
- Giovanni Battista Piranesi (1720–1778), Prints, Drawings, and Photographs : page 220
- Camille Pissarro (1830–1903), European Painting and Sculpture : page 203
- Paul Poiret (1879-1944), Costume and Textiles : page 97
- Jackson Pollock (1912–1956), Twentieth-century Art : page 327
- Paulus Potter (1625–1654), European Painting and Sculpture : page 176
- Nicolas Poussin (1594–1665), European Painting and Sculpture : page 175
- Michael Powolny (1871-1954), European decorative arts and Arms & Armour : page 155
- Martin Puryear (b. 1941), Twentieth-century Art : page 340
- Pierre-Cécile Puvis De Chavannes (1824–1898), European Painting and Sculpture : page 191
- Robert Rauschenberg (1925–2008), Twentieth-century Art : page 334
- Osmon Reed, American Art : page 280
- Pierre-Auguste Renoir (1841–1919), European Painting and Sculpture : page 196, 200
- Joshua Reynolds (1723–1792), European Painting and Sculpture : page 184
- Faith Ringgold (b. 1930), Costume and Textiles : page 103
- Diego Rivera (1886–1957), Prints, Drawings, and Photographs : page 242, 322
- Francesco Maria Rivolta, European decorative arts and Arms & Armour : page 137
- Luca della Robbia (1399-1482), European decorative arts and Arms & Armour : page 113
- Howard Roberts (1843-1900), American Art : page 286
- Auguste Rodin (1840–1917), European Painting and Sculpture : page 199, 201, 210
- Rookwood pottery, American Art : page 294
- Helen Rose (1904-1985), Costume and Textiles : page 100
- James Rosenquist (1933–2017), Twentieth-century Art : page 332
- Georges Rouault (1871–1958), Twentieth-century Art : page 323
- Henri Rousseau (1844–1910), European Painting and Sculpture : page 202
- Peter Paul Rubens (1577–1640), European Painting and Sculpture : page 130, 174
- William Rush (1756-1833), American Art : page 276
- Santiago Rusiñol (1861-1931), European Painting and Sculpture : page 205
- Pieter Jansz Saenredam (1597–1665), European Painting and Sculpture : page 173
- Augustus Saint-Gaudens (1848–1907), American Art : page 293
- Roberto Sambonet (1924-1995), European decorative arts and Arms & Armour : page 156
- John Singer Sargent (1856–1925), American Art : page 289
- Rebecca Scattergood Savery (1770-1855), Costume and Textiles : page 91
- Savonnerie manufactory, European decorative arts and Arms & Armour : page 134
- Elsa Schiaparelli (1890-1973), Costume and Textiles : page 98
- Emilio Schuberth (1904-1972), Costume and Textiles : page 101
- Georges Seurat (1859–1891), Prints, Drawings, and Photographs : page 229
- Sèvres porcelain, European decorative arts and Arms & Armour : page 142
- Ben Shahn (1898–1969), Twentieth-century Art : page 328
- Charles Sheeler (1883–1965), Prints, Drawings, and Photographs : page 243, 324
- Kataro Shirayamadani (1865-1948), American Art : page 294
- William Sinclair (furniture maker), American Art : page 270
- Olaf Skoogfors (1930-1975), American Art : page 299
- John French Sloan (1871–1951), American Art : page 233, 294
- Frans Snyders (1579–1657), European Painting and Sculpture : page 174
- Marc-Louis-Emmanuel Solon (1835-1913), European decorative arts and Arms & Armour : page 153
- Ettore Sottsass Jr. (1917-2007), European decorative arts and Arms & Armour : page 157
- Rudolf Staffel (1911-2002), American Art : page 300
- Jan Steen (1626–1679), European Painting and Sculpture : page 178
- Alfred Stieglitz (1864–1946), Prints, Drawings, and Photographs : page 234, 242
- Paul Strand (1890–1976), Prints, Drawings, and Photographs : page 238
- George Stubbs (1724–1806), European Painting and Sculpture : page 181
- Philip Syng Jr. (1703-1789), American Art : page 262
- Henry Ossawa Tanner (1859–1937), American Art : page 295
- Hans Taye, European decorative arts and Arms & Armour : page 130
- Thonet Brothers (1796—1871), European decorative arts and Arms & Armour : page 153
- Bertel Thorvaldsen (1770—1844), European decorative arts and Arms & Armour : page 148
- Dox Thrash (1893-1965), Prints, Drawings, and Photographs : page 246
- Ellen Powell Tiberino (1937-1992), Prints, Drawings, and Photographs : page 249
- Giovanni Battista Tiepolo (1696–1770), European Painting and Sculpture : page 182
- Louis Comfort Tiffany (1848–1933), American Art : page 296
- Tiffany Glass and Decorating Co., American Art : page 296
- Johann Heinrich Wilhelm Tischbein (1751-1829), Prints, Drawings, and Photographs : page 224
- Shomei Tomatsu (1930-2012), Prints, Drawings, and Photographs : page 249
- Henri de Toulouse-Lautrec (1864–1901), European Painting and Sculpture : page 206
- William Ellis Tucker (d. 1832), American Art : page 277
- Tucker porcelain, American Art : page 277
- J. M. W. Turner (1775–1851), European Painting and Sculpture : page 189
- Cy Twombly (1928–2011), Twentieth-century Art : page 340
- Robert Venturi (1925-2018), American Art : page 300
- Scott Brown Venturi, American Art : page 300
- Claude Joseph Vernet (1714–1789), European Painting and Sculpture : page 180
- Édouard Vuillard (1868–1940), European Painting and Sculpture : page 205, 230
- Josiah Wedgwood (1730-1795), European decorative arts and Arms & Armour : page 148
- Robert Wellford, American Art : page 266
- Adolf Ulrik Wertmüller (1751-1811), American Art : page 269
- Benjamin West (1738–1820), European Painting and Sculpture : page 184
- Rogier van der Weyden (1400–1464), European Painting and Sculpture : page 167
- James Abbott McNeill Whistler (1834–1903), American Art : page 283
- David Wiand, Costume and Textiles : page 93
- Wiener Keramik, European decorative arts and Arms & Armour : page 155
- Charles Frederick Worth (1825-1895), Costume and Textiles : page 94
- Andrew Wyeth (1917–2009), Twentieth-century Art : page 331
- Juan Ximenez (1470-1510), European Painting and Sculpture : page 168
- Yi Am (1499-?), Asian art : page 36
- Claire Zeisler (1903-1991), American Art : page 301
- Antonio Zucchi (1726–1796), European decorative arts and Arms & Armour : page 143
- Francisco de Zurbarán (1598–1664), European Painting and Sculpture : page 176
