= List of Moldovan artists =

This is a list of notable visual artists from, or associated with, Moldova.

== A ==
- Vasile Adam (born 1956), woodwork artist

== B ==
- Ilya Bogdesko (1923–2010), painter
- Grigoriy Bronza (1927–2010), artist and stamp designer

== C ==
- Tudor Cataraga (1956–2010), sculptor

== G ==
- Mihai Grecu (1916–1998), painter

== M ==
- Grégoire Michonze (1902–1982), painter

== P ==
- Mihai Petric (1923–2005), painter
- Alexandru Plămădeală (1888–1940), sculptor

== S ==
- Andrei Sârbu (1950–2000), painter
- Ion Severin, illustrator

== T ==
- Alexander Tinei (born 1967), painter

== V ==
- Igor Vieru (1923–1988), painter
- Gheorghe Vrabie (1939–2016), artist

== Z ==
- Victor Zâmbrea (1924–2000), painter
