= List of Julian Ashton Art School alumni =

This is a list of notable people who have attended the Julian Ashton Art School.

== A ==
- Harold Abbott (1906–1986)
- John E. C. Appleton (1905–1990)
- Julian Howard Ashton (1877–1964)
- Yvonne Audette (born 1930)

== B ==
- Herbert Badham (1899–1961), 1925 to 1938
- Laurie Scott Baker (born 1943), commenced 1958
- Jean Bellette (1908–1991), finished 1936
- Portia Mary Bennett (1898–1989)
- Karna Maria Birmingham (1900–1987), 1914 to 1920
- Dorrit Black (1891–1951), 1915
- Florence Turner Blake (1873–1959), commenced 1890
- Viola Macmillan Brown (1897–1981), 1919 to 1922

== C ==
- Leon Coward (born 1991)
- Max Cullen (born 1940), 1959
- [(Julia Cleary)] (born 1960)

== D ==
- Anne Dangar (1885–1951)
- Una Deerbon (1882–1972)
- Paul Delprat (born 1942)
- William Dobell (1899–1970), commenced 1925

== F ==
- Adrian Feint (1894–1971), commenced 1911
- Roger Fletcher (born 1949)

== G ==
- Jules de Goede (1937–2007)
- Geoffrey de Groen (born 1938)
- Elioth Gruner (1882–1939)

== H ==
- Paul Haefliger (1914–1982), finished 1936
- Edmund Arthur Harvey (1907–1994), 1922 to 1925
- Edwin James Hayes (1918–1997), 1935
- Ralph Heimans
- Nora Heysen (1911–2003), 1931
- J. J. Hilder (1881–1916), 1906

== J ==
- Lionel Jago (1882–1953)
- Charles Lloyd Jones (1878–1958), commenced 1895

== L ==
- George Washington Lambert (1873–1930), finished 1900
- George Lawrence (1901–1981)
- Bill Leak (1956–2017), 1974 to 1975
- Fred Leist (1873–1945)
- Norman Lloyd (1895–1983), commenced 1911

== M ==
- Roy De Maistre (1894–1968)
- Jeffrey Makin, 1961
- Alexander McKenzie (born 1971), finished 1994
- Emile Mercier (1901–1981)

== N ==
- Kim Nelson (1958–2015), 1976
- Paul Newton
- Deborah Niland (born 1950)
- Kilmeny Niland (1950–2009)

== O ==
- John Olsen (1928–2023), 1950 to 1953
- Margaret Oppen (1890–1975), artist and embroiderer

== P ==
- Wendy Paramor (1938–1975)
- John Passmore (1904–1984)
- Don Peebles (1922–2010)
- Olive Pink (1884–1975)
- Thea Proctor (1879–1966), commenced 1896

== R ==
- Alison Rehfisch (1900–1974), 1916 to 1919
- Lola Ridge (1873–1941)
- Florence Aline Rodway (1881–1971)
- Dan Russell (1906–1999)
- Jim Russell (1909–2001)

== S ==
- Joshua Smith (1905–1995)
- Sydney Ure Smith (1887–1949), 1902 to 1907
- Helen Stewart (1900–1983), commenced 1930

== T ==
- Madge Tennent (1889–1972)
- Nigel Thomson (1945–1999)
- Graeme Townsend (1973–1974)

== W ==
- Susan Dorothea White (born 1941)
- Brett Whiteley (1939–1992)
- Wendy Whiteley (born 1941)

== Z ==
- Salvatore Zofrea (born 1946)
