= List of alumni of the Byam Shaw School of Art =

This is a list of notable people who studied at the Byam Shaw School of Art from its foundation in 1910 until it was absorbed by Central Saint Martins College of Arts and Design in 2003.

- Eileen Agar
- George Warner Allen
- Jananne Al-Ani
- Bernadette Ash
- Beezy Bailey
- Nicola Bealing
- Maria Björnson
- Vhils
- Manuel Botelho
- Dorothy Braddell
- Matthew Collings
- Simon Chambers
- Janet Cree
- Bernard Dunstan
- James Dyson
- Theo Fennell
- Franko B
- Elsie Gledstanes
- Stephanie Godwin
- Francesca Gonshaw
- Xanthos Hadjisoteriou
- Mona Hatoum
- Cecil Higgs
- Eliot Hodgkin
- Evie Hone
- Anna Hornby
- Blair Hughes-Stanton
- Ibrahim Hussein (artist)
- Naz Ikramullah
- Laurence Irving (set designer)
- Lucy Jones (artist)
- Peter Kennard
- Henry Kondracki
- Danny Lane
- Stefanos Lazaridis
- John Long (artist)
- Robert Medley
- Liz Miller
- Winifred Nicholson
- Conrad O'Brien-ffrench
- Nuha al-Radi
- Sydney Robertson-Rodger
- Hassan Sharif
- Yinka Shonibare
- Paul Simonon
- Kenneth Snowman
- Clodagh Hope Knox Sparrow
- John Standing
- Madeleine Strindberg
- Gilly Szego
- Valerie Thornton
- Mackenzie Thorpe
- Gabriela Trzebinski
- Rachel Ward
- Valentine Warner
- O Zhang
- Osbert Lancaster
- Gordana Stanisic
