= Victoria Blyth Hill =

American art conservator

Blyth Hill in 2012

Victoria Blyth Hill (November 17, 1945 – April 20, 2013) was an American art conservator who lived and worked in the Venice area of Los Angeles. She retired from the Los Angeles County Museum of Art as the Director, Conservation Center in June 2005 when she was honored with an appointment as Senior Conservator Emeritus at the Los Angeles County Museum of Art (LACMA). Subsequently she worked with private clients, including artists, individuals, and museums, and operated an art conservation studio near her home. She was a past president of the Western Association for Art Conservation (1979). Blyth-Hill was elected Fellow of the American Institute for Conservation of Historic and Artistic Works (AIC) in 1990.

== Career ==
Born in Los Angeles, Blyth-Hill began her museum career at the Museum of Modern Art, New York, as assistant to the traveling manager working on the museum's national and international traveling exhibitions in 1966. She returned to California, and joined the J. Paul Getty Museum where she was an assistant painting conservator, 1973; Blyth-Hill became an assistant paper conservator in 1974 at LACMA, where she held number of positions until being named director of the Conservation Center in 1999. She was one of the founding conservators at the LACMA Conservation Center, the first art conservation center on the West Coast.

In 1976, Blyth-Hill began research on the stabilization for pastels in the course of preservation work on a Mary Cassatt pastel Mother and Child drawing from the collection of Dr. Armand Hammer (now in the collection at the Hammer Museum, Los Angeles, CA). She presented a scientific paper on the topic at the American Institute for Conservation's annual meeting in June 1978. Later, in 1980 she obtained U.S. Patent No. 4257083 for the invention of a prototype of the "Electrostatic Stabilizing Plate." In 1982, Blyth-Hill restored the Codex Leicester (a Leonardo "notebook" on the nature of water), owned by Dr. Armand Hammer (now owned by Bill Gates).

In addition to working extensively with modern and contemporary western art, she had specialized training and experience with Asian, East and South Asian art, including Indian Miniatures, Japanese prints, Japanese screens and Tibetan thangka. In 1984, Hill was chosen to study Japanese screen mounting with Sigura, one of the Living National Treasures of Japan and a former mounter at the Freer Gallery in Washington, D.C. The three-month intensive program for 10 professional international art conservators was held at the Bishop Museum, Honolulu, Hawaii.

Beginning in 1994 she studied Henri Matisse cut-outs and their preservation treatments in Europe (Netherlands, France, Switzerland and Italy), interviewing museum and independent art conservationists. She toured European and Japanese paper mills in 1983 and beyond throughout her career. She studied paper-making, production and conservation extensively in Europe and Asia. Blyth-Hill was a frequent contributor (1985–1995) to the Paper Conservation Catalog, published by the Book and Paper Group, American Institute for Conservation, Washington, D.C.

She published many articles on paper and Asian art preservation, and was the author of a guidebook, Care and Handling of Thangkas: A Guide for Caretakers, which has been distributed to monasteries throughout India, China, Tibet, Nepal, Bhutan and Japan. The book was not copyright-protected to ease its distribution to monasteries in the remote regions of Southeast Asia. She attended the Nyingmas Menlom gathering as a special guest to recognize her work in the preservation of thangkas. She conducted surveys of public and private thangka collections in Rome, Tibet, the Nelson-Atkins Museum of Art in Kansas City, Missouri, and the Virginia Museum of Fine Arts in Richmond, Virginia. In an interview with the L.A Times, Blyth-Hill spoke about conservation:

Conservation as a field is holistic and encompasses restoration as well as examination, documentation, preventative care and treatment and is supported by research. With us, less is more. We stabilize the object and present it in its original state as much as possible.

Among the artworks Blyth-Hill worked on are those by Leonardo da Vinci, Rembrandt van Rijn, Auguste Renoir, Mary Cassatt, Henri Matisse, Marcel Duchamp, Larry Bell, Ed Ruscha, David Hockney, Marc Chagall, Robert Motherwell, Pablo Picasso, Alexander Calder, Isami Noguchi, Frank Stella, Craig Kauffman, and Wallace Berman.

== Personal life ==
Victoria Blyth Hill was married to Charles Christopher Hill, a painter and printmaker.

== Works ==
=== Books and articles ===
- Blyth-Hill, Victoria (June 1978). "Electrostatic Stabiliizing Plate (ESP): An Alternative Method for stabilizing the flaking tendencies of works of art on paper". Journal of the American Institute for Conservation. Washington, D.C.
- Blyth-Hill, Victoria (June 1982). "The research and treatment of Leonardo da Vinci's manuscript on the nature of water". Codex Hammer. Washington D.C.: American Institute for Conservation: 113–123.
- Blyth-Hill, Victoria (May 1993). "A history of thanka conservation in Western Collections". Western Association of Art Conservators Newsletter. Los Angeles.
- Blyth-Hill, Victoria; Schaeffer, T. T.; Druzki, J. R. (1996). "Aqueous light bleaching paper: Comparison of hydroxide and magnesium bicarbonate bathing solutions". Journal of the American Institute for Conservation. 35 (3). Washington, D.C.
- Blyth-Hill, Victoria; Kyentse, Jamyang; Chan, Elsie; Phuntso, Sonam (2008). Care and handling of thangks: A guide for caretakers. San Francisco: Khyentse Foundation. (Trans. Chinese, English, Tibetan). Second edition, 2010.

=== Patents ===
- US 4257083 for the Electrostatic Stabilizing Plate, 1981.
