= List of early-20th-century British children's literature illustrators =

This is a list of early-20th-century British children's literature illustrators. It is organised by order of date of birth where shown, then alphabetically by surname.

- W. Graham Robertson (1866–1948)
- Arthur Rackham (1867–1939)
- H. R. Millar (1869–1940)
- Charles Robinson (1870–1937)
- W. Heath Robinson (1872–1944)
- Steven Spurrier (1878–1961)
- E. H. Shepherd (1879–1976)
- Thomas Henry Fisher (1879–1962)
- Gerald Spencer Pryse (1882–1956)
- Evelyn Paul (1883–1963)
- Arthur Ransome (1884–1967)
- Clifford Webb (1895–1972)
- Joyce Lankester Brisley (1896–1978)
- Norah Montgomerie (1909–1998)
