= Jay McCafferty =

American painter (1948–2021)

- Born: February 21, 1948
- Died: March 21, 2021; Santa Barbara, California, United States of America
- Education: California State University, Los Angeles (BA) University of California, Irvine (MFA)
- Occupations: Artist, painter, filmmaker
- Employer: Harbor College
- Spouse: Ellen Montgomery
- Website: https://www.jaymccafferty.com/

Jay McCafferty

Jay McCafferty (February 21, 1948 – March 21, 2021) was a California painter, video artist, and filmmaker.

== Background ==
McCafferty was a student at the Los Angeles Harbor College, Wilmington, California, for a brief time following high school. He attended Chapman College where he also studied on the World Campus Afloat before attending California State University, Los Angeles, where he earned a Bachelor of Arts degree in art. In 1973 he earned an MFA degree from the University of California, Irvine (UCI) where he studied with classmates Charles Christopher Hill, John Knight, Richard Newton, and Alexis Smith.

McCafferty was an associate professor of art and head of the art department at Los Angeles Harbor College, Wilmington. He has also worked as a lifeguard for the County of Los Angeles part-time from 1966 through retirement in 1996; he worked at Southern California beaches from Ventura County to San Pedro, California.

At UCI McCafferty studied with artists, such as Craig Kauffman, Ed Moses and Tony DeLap and was influenced by figures such as Phil Leider, founder of Artforum magazine. McCafferty presented his first video exhibition, solo, in 1974 at the Long Beach Museum of Art. It was described as "a suite of truly humorous and poetic single-channel videos." During this period, he began filming Self Portrait, Every Year (1972 - ongoing), a project that "encompasses thirty-five years of daily grooming compiled into a moving self-portrait that traces the artist through time." At about the same time, McCafferty started Autobiography, which he described to Glenn Phillips, curator of the Getty Research Institute:

I had a new piece of equipment, and people didn't know what it was. So I put it in their face and ask them, "What do you think of Jay McCafferty?" And they'd give me an answer, and the answer was usually more about them than me, which is obvious because nobody can know you as you are. 'they know you from the context of where you're meeting them and how you've interacted. In the context, it was usually pretty fresh, and I'd get really candid things out of the subjects.

In 1973, McCaffferty showed the solar burn paintings in a solo show curated by Charles Christopher Hill at Gallery TJB in Newport Beach, California, an early Orange County alternative gallery and at the Cirrus Gallery in Los Angeles. The show is described:

Discouraged by art dealers' lack of interest in showing video, McCafferty switched his focus to a solar burn 'painting' technique he devised. Working outdoors, using a magnifying glass and the sun's heat and l light, he burns holes of various sizes into stacked sheets of gridded vellum paper. Depending on the intensity of the sun and other atmospheric conditions, McCafferty can create a variety of effects. The burns in the paper also leave behind a smoky residue which adds a painterly quality.

James Bravin in the LA Times described the paintings: "McCafferty's burn paintings, which have been exhibited at the Los Angeles County Museum of Art and the Long Beach Museum of Art, consist of several layers of paper that the artist prepares with different pigments. Placed atop his roof, McCafferty chooses a pattern, often based on a grid, then focuses a magnifying glass on a particular area." Sandy Ballatore in Art in America writes that the works are "the gridded, singed, skeletal remains of his own peculiar art-making ritual: sitting on his studio roof, magnifying lens in hand and sun overhead, he ignites papers, plastic, wood, cardboard... in a mechanical meditative rite. " The New Art Examiner notes: "Jay McCafferty's wall hangings are extremely delicate and lace-like. He has converted large pieces of grid paper into a fragile network of tiny holes by a process of solar burning. With a magnifying glass, he laboriously burns holes into the framework provided by the grid. His use of repetitive elements is a recording activity of his creative process."

== Awards ==
- 1974 New Talent Award, Los Angeles County Museum of Art (Contemporary Arts Council), Los Angeles
- 1976 Grant Recipient, National Endowment for the Arts

== Selected collections ==
- The Capital Group
- Century Plaza Hotel
- Coca-Cola Company, Atlanta, GA
- Fairmont Hotel Group
- Federal Reserve Bank, San Francisco
- The Getty Museum, Los Angeles
- IBM Corporation
- International Paper Company
- Los Angeles County Museum of Art
- Museum of Modern Art, New York
- Newport Harbor Art Museum
- O'Melveny & Meyers, Los Angeles
- Progressive Corporation, Pepper Pike, OH
- Scripps Clinic & Research Foundation
- Security Pacific National Bank, Los Angeles
- Sheraton Grand Hotel, Tokyo, Japan
