= List of French stained glass manufacturers =

This is an alphabetical list of French Ateliers producing stained polychrome Glass.

== List ==
Name	City	Dates active	Notes
Auguste Alleaume			
Jean-Baptiste Anglade			
Gabriel Argy-Rousseau			
Guillaume Barbe		15th Century	
Louis Barillet	Paris		
Jean René Bazaine		20th Century	
Berthier-Bessac			
Lucien Bégule			
Philippe-Joseph Brocard			
Richard Burgsthal			
Romain Buron			
Amédée de Caranza			
Henri Carot			
Lecomte & Colin	Rennes	19th Century	Works in Saintes
Marie-Alain Couturier			
Édouard Didron			
Félix Gaudin			
Michel Gigon			
Linard Gonthier			
Peter Hemmel of Andlau			
Emile Hirsch (painter)			
Marguerite Huré			
Jacques Le Chevallier			
Gabriel Loire			
Alfred Manessier			
Brigitte Nogaro			
Guillaume de Marcillat			
Joseph Villiet			
Amalric Walter			
Gaston Watkin			
