= William Ellis Tucker =

American porcelain maker (1800–1832)

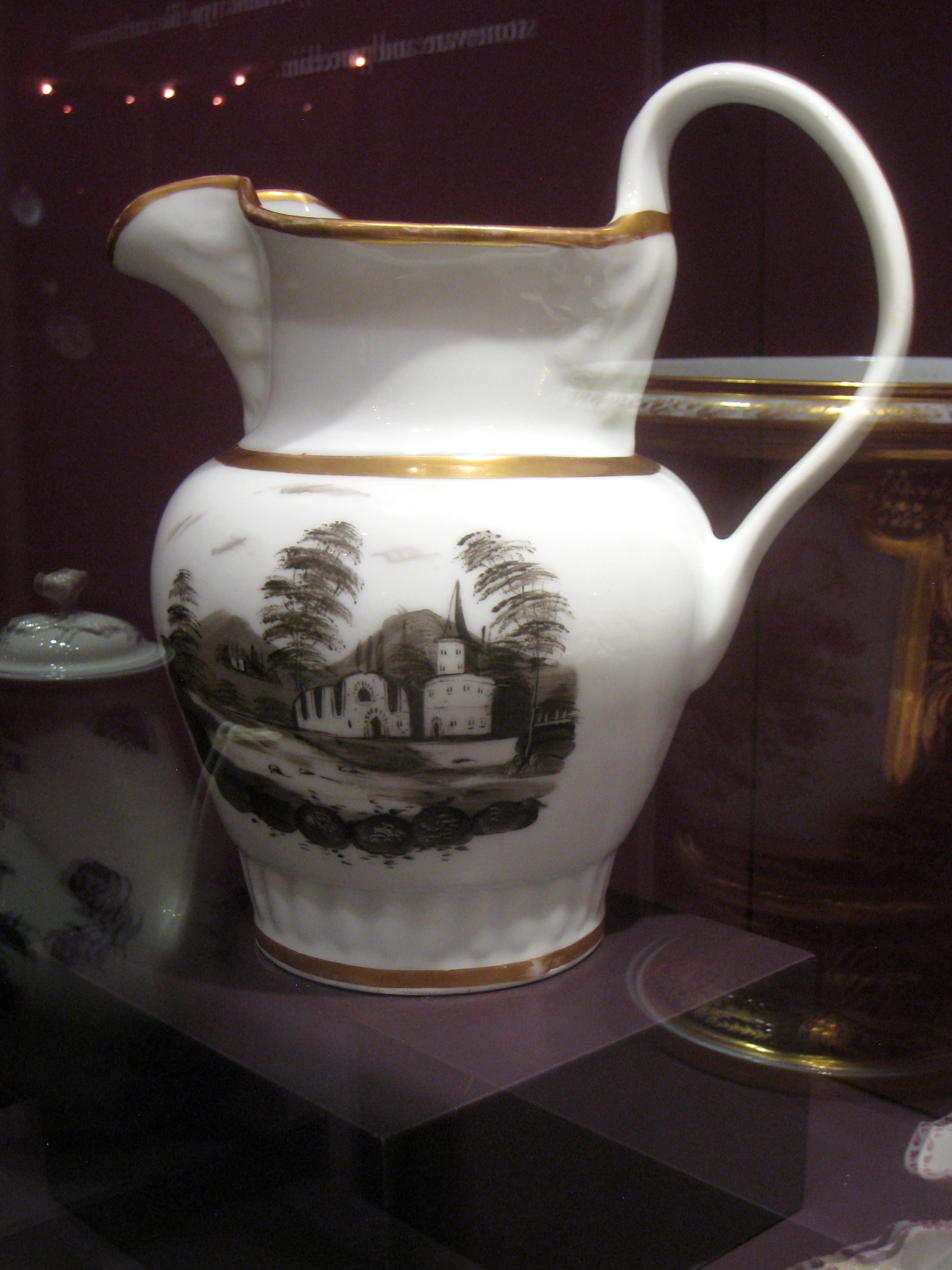
Tucker porcelain pitcher

William Ellis Tucker (1800–1832) was an American craftsman who became the first person to successfully produce hard paste porcelain for the home market made entirely in the United States of purely domestic materials.

There had been several previous attempts at the craft by progressive American potters prior to 1825, some of which had been partially successful. However, all porcelain products sold or used in the young country were imported from Europe.

In 1826, Tucker established the first hard paste porcelain factory in the United States in Philadelphia . Tucker formed a partnership with potter Thomas Hulme in 1828 that allowed him to greatly expand production. Even though Tucker and Hulme worked together for less than one year, there are some pieces surviving bearing their mark.

In 1831, Tucker formed a second partnership with Alexander Hemphill.

Tucker died in 1832.

After Tucker's death, the firm was joined by Hemphill's father (Judge Joseph Hemphill) and brother (Thomas Hemphill). The factory continued production under the Hemphill name until it closed in 1838.

The Tucker porcelains included dinner services, coffee and tea services and pitchers as well as ornamental wear such as urns and baskets. Some items were pure white and gilt, but most were hand painted and decorated with gold leaf. Surviving examples of Tucker porcelain are extremely rare and very valuable today.
