= Norah Montgomerie =

British folklorist, illustrator and writer (1909–1998)

- Born: Norah Mary Shargool; 6 April 1909; West Dulwich, London
- Died: 19 February 1998 (aged 88); Edinburgh
- Occupations: Folklorist, illustrator, writer

Norah Montgomerie (6 April 1909 – 19 February 1998), born Norah Mary Shargool, was a British folklorist, illustrator and writer.

== Early life ==
Norah Shargool was born in West Dulwich, London, the daughter of Letitia Alexander Shirley Shargool (nee Sawyer), a seamstress, and John Shargool, an accountant. She was educated at a boarding school in Folkestone and then at art school in London. Montgomerie told a newspaper that she learned songs, stories and rhymes from her great-grandmother, and carried her foremother's advice, "Don't give children paps, give them something they can chew!" into her own work.

== Career ==
Norah Montgomerie moved to Dundee where she worked for the Scottish publishing company DC Thomson. She also worked in London as a magazine illustrator. In her work she promoted Scots language, traditional tales and poetry in general. With her husband, Montgomerie collected Scottish folk songs and nursery rhymes, and edited and illustrated collections of Scottish folk songs and rhymes for children, including these titles:

- Sandy Candy and other Scottish Nursery Rhymes (1948)
- The Well at the World's End (1956)
- The Hogarth book of Scottish nursery rhymes (1964)
- From Time to Time: Selected Poems (1985)

In addition, she wrote and illustrated her own books, including The Merry Little Fox and Other Animal Tales (1959), Twenty-five Fables (1962), To Read and to Tell (1964), This Little Pig Went to Market: Play rhymes for infants and young children (1966, with illustrator Margery Gill), and One, Two, Three: A Little Book of Counting Rhymes (1967). In 2009, a collection of her manuscripts titled The Fantastical Feats of Finn MacCoul was published by her grandson Julian Brooks.

== Personal life ==
In 1934, Norah Shargool married William Montgomerie, a Scottish poet and folklorist. They had two children, Dian and Ian. Norah Montgomerie was widowed in 1994, and died in 1998, aged 88 years, in Edinburgh.
