= List of postminimalist artists =

Artists who are frequently considered postminimalist include:

- Vito Acconci (1940–2017)
- Rodney Carswell (born 1946)
- Christine Corday (born 1970)
- Tom Friedman (born 1965)
- Felix Gonzalez-Torres (1957–1996)
- Robert Grosvenor
- Mona Hatoum (born 1952)
- Eva Hesse (1936–1970)
- Damien Hirst (born 1965)
- Anish Kapoor (born 1954)
- Gary Kuehn (born 1939)
- Wolfgang Laib (born 1950)
- Robert Morris (1931–2018)
- Keith Milow (born 1945)
- Bruce Nauman (born 1941)
- Joseph Nechvatal (born 1951)
- Gabriel Orozco (born 1962)
- Martin Puryear (born 1941)
- Charles Ray (born 1953)
- Alan Saret (born 1944)
- Satyendra Pakhalé (born 1967)
- Joel Shapiro (1941–2025)
- Santiago Sierra (born 1966)
- Robert Smithson (1938–1973)
- Keith Sonnier (1941–2020)
- Cecil Touchon (born 1956)
- Richard Tuttle (born 1941)
- Richard Wentworth (born 1947)
- Rachel Whiteread (born 1963)
- Hannah Wilke (1940–1993)
- Anne Wilson (born 1949)
- Jackie Winsor (1941-2024)
- Xurban collective
