= Alexander Tinei =

Hungarian painter

Alexander Tinei (born 1967 in Căuşeni, Moldova) is a painter based in Budapest, Hungary. He has had solo exhibitions in New York City, Vienna, and Budapest and has been included in group exhibitions in London, Berlin, Frankfurt, Amsterdam, Basel, Prague, and Athens. In 2010, Ana Cristea Gallery presented Tinei's work at VOLTA NY. In 2009, he was one of twelve Romanian and Hungarian painters included in a curated exhibition at the Prague Biennale.
