= Charles Christopher Hill =

American artist and printmaker (born 1948)

Charles Christopher Hill, Paris, 2010

Charles Christopher Hill (born March 4, 1948, in Greensburg, Pennsylvania) is an American artist and printmaker. Hill lives and works in Los Angeles, California and was married to the late Victoria Blyth Hill, an art conservator. He has been artist in residence at Cité International Des Arts, Paris, France, at Chateau de La Napoule, La Napoule, France and at Eklisia, Gümüslük, Turkey (1994).

== Background ==
At the University of California, Irvine (UCI), Hill studied with Ed Moses, Billy Al Bengston, and Vija Celmins, with classmates Chris Burden, Alexis Smith, Ned Evans, and Richard Newton. He earned an MFA degree from UCI in 1973.

== Early work ==
For Connie by Charles Christopher Hill, 1974, Honolulu Museum of Art

Hill had his first solo exhibitions in 1972 at Newspace Gallery and at Jack Glenn Gallery, both in Newport Beach, California, and has since established himself as a Southern California painter. Hill has had solo exhibitions worldwide including exhibitions at the Galerie Krebs and the Galerie Maurer in Switzerland, at the Richard Demarco Gallery in Scotland; at the Galleria Del Cavalinoi in Italy; at the Galerie Baudoin Lebon in Paris; at the Rocket Gallery in London, and throughout the United States.

Describing Hill's early works from the 1970s in the Los Angeles Times, critic Sharon Mizota writes that the works are "large, torn paper collages shot through with stitching. With their vibrant hues, and rough, distressed surfaces, they are at once sublime and down-home, flickering somewhere between Color Field painting and well-loved, homemade quilts." Susan C. Larsen, writing about Hill's earlier newspaper-based work in ARTnews describes:"work [that] presents crumbling, brightly colored, sensuous layers of weathered paper and canvas, which have been pasted and sewn together and then weathered, buried in the ground, soaked and otherwise endangered and enriched by processes of decay." Colin Gardner writes in February 1987, of Hill's transition to more formal painting: "the artist has dabbled in paint and introduced a trademark vocabulary of crosses, X-shapes, fragmented checkerboards and grid patterns alluding to mathematical systems, patchwork quilts and modernist formalism." For Connie, from 1974, in the collection of the Honolulu Museum of Art is an example of Hill's early collages. It is made from paper, pigment, thread, dirt and gold leaf.

== Recent work ==
"In recent work, Hill has created paintings related to the sculptural works of Finish Fetish artist, Larry Bell [and Peter Alexander]." Hill paints bands across the canvas with perhaps fifty layers. He uses a full color palette with a final application of red or black; between each layer of paint he applies an acrylic varnish.

The built-up layers of the two acrylic materials (the varnish and the paint) create a saturated, lustrous, glossy surface. Echoing the ideas behind the light and space / finish fetish movement the paintings play with light, environment, and special relationships.

Showing new paintings at Leslie Sacks Contemporary in Santa Monica, August 2012, critic Peter Frank writes about Hill's work in the Huffington Post: "His current stripe paintings, as raw and obdurate as they are contained and minimized, inherited their stark contracts and slick but alluring surfaces from a twenty-year-old series engaging eccentric shapes."

In 2011, Hill's paintings were included in two significant museum exhibitions: Under the Big Black Sun: California Art, 1974-1981, at the Museum of Contemporary Art, Los Angeles, and Best Kept Secret: UCI and the Development of Contemporary Art in Southern California 1964-1971, at the Laguna Art Museum, Laguna, California, which were organized for the Getty Research Institute initiative: Pacific Standard Time (PST). The Getty's PST efforts encouraged Southern California art institutions to document and exhibit works significant in Los Angeles art history, 1945-1980.

== Selected collections ==
Hill's work is included in many museum collections including: The Albright–Knox Art Gallery (Buffalo, New York), the Centre Georges Pompidou (Paris), the Honolulu Museum of Art, the Los Angeles County Museum of Art, the Musée des Beaux-Arts d'Angers (Angers, France), the Museum of Modern Art (New York), the Solomon R. Guggenheim Museum (New York), and the Total Museum of Contemporary Art (Seoul, Korea) are among the public collections holding works by Charles Christopher Hill.

== Selected exhibitions ==
- 2012 Charles Christopher Hill, Leslie Sacks Contemporary, Bergamot Station, Santa Monica, California

Charles Christopher Hill, Galerie Baudoin Lebon, Paris
California Abstract Painting 1952-2011, Woodbury University, Burbank, California

- 2011 Charles Christopher Hill-Francis Limerat, Galerie Kandler, Toulouse, France

"Under the Big Black Sun," California Art 1974-1981, MOCA, Los Angeles, California, Pacific Standard Time exhibition
"Best Kept Secret: UCI and the Development of Contemporary Art in Southern California 1964-1971," Laguna Art Museum, Laguna Beach, California, Pacific Standard Time exhibition
"Framing Abstraction: Mark, Symbol, Signifier," Los Angeles Municipal Art Gallery, Barnsdall Park
"Proof: The Rise of Printmaking in Southern California," Norton Simon Museum of Art, Pasadena, California

- 2010 “Outside the Box," Edition Jacob Samuel, Hammer Museum, Los Angeles, California
- 2009 “Suivez la Ligne,” Charles Christopher Hill-Francis Limerat, 212 Gallery Aspen, Colorado
- 2008 "Over the edge", Charles Christopher Hill, Rocket Gallery, London, UK

== Artist books ==
- Hill, Charles Christopher and John Yau, Mon Alias Mona Lisa, published by Collectif Génération, Colombes, France, 1989
- Hill, Charles Christopher and Kristine McKenna, The Smells of Summer, published by Jacob Samuel, Santa Monica, California, 1994

== Awards ==
- 1976 New Talent Award, Los Angeles County Museum of Art (Contemporary Arts Council), Los Angeles

Grant Recipient, National Endowment for the Arts, Washington, D.C.

- 1992 Grant Recipient, National Endowment for the Arts
