= Ion Severin =

Ion Severin is a Moldavian illustrator. He exhibited in Riga, Latvia in 1994, in Lubeck, Germany in 1995 and in Paris, France in 1997, 1998 and 2000 and then again in Strasbourg, France in 2009. He has illustrated more than one hundred books. In 2000, one of Severin's works was selected to be the cover of the first 2000 issue of the Journal of International Children's Literature “Book Bird”. He works primarily with pen and ink but also works with pastels, and paints in oils. During French President Jacques Chirac’s official visit to Chisinau, Republic of Moldova, in 1998, Moldova’s President selected one of Severin's works to be presented as a gift to President Chirac.
