= Manuel Joachim de Franca =

American painter

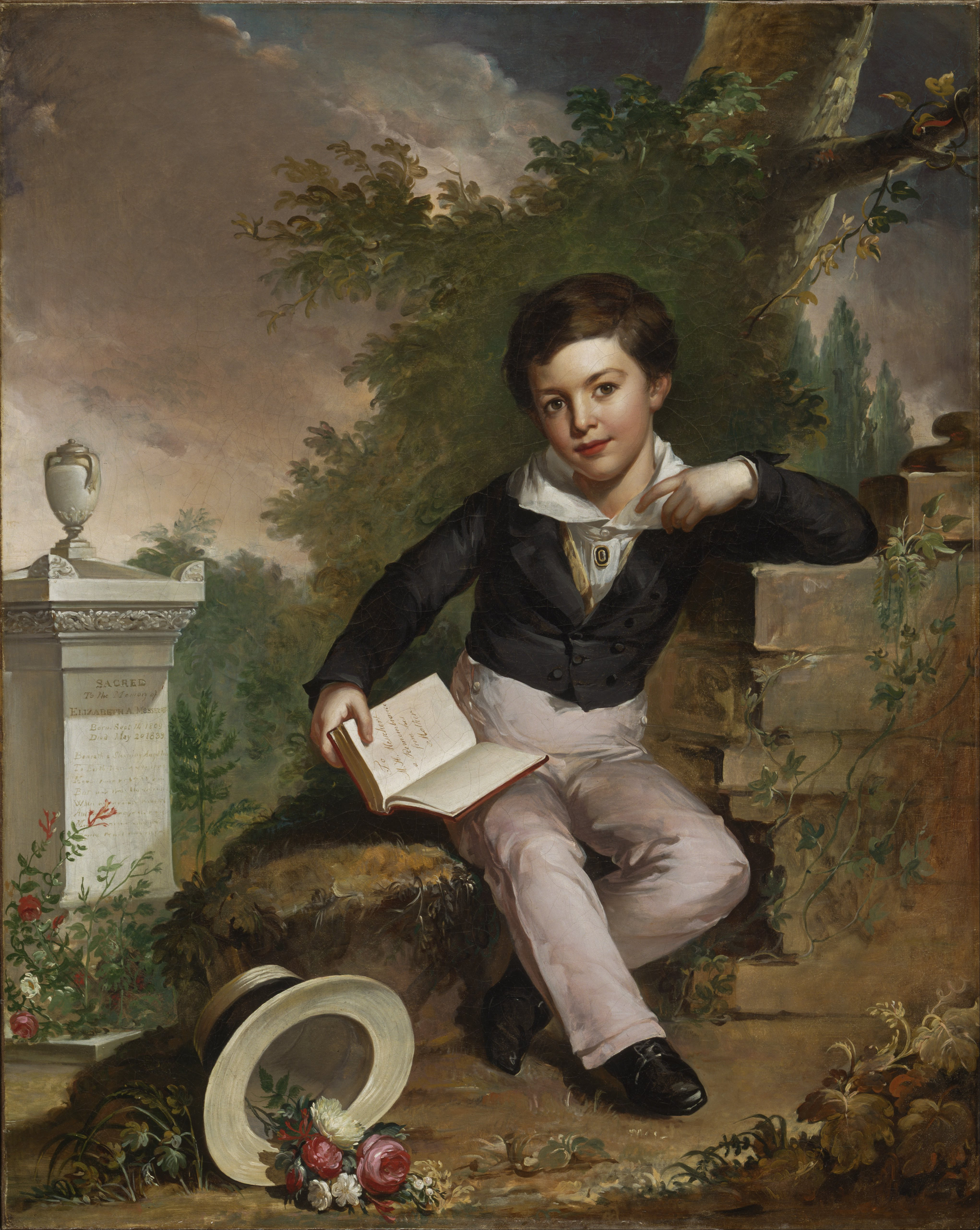
Portrait of Matthew Huizinga Messchert

Manuel Joachim de Franca (1808 – August 22, 1865), was a Portuguese-American painter.

He was born in Porto, Portugal and emigrated to Philadelphia where he lived and worked until 1842 before moving to St. Louis. Whilst in St. Louis, he befriended William J. Hinchey and allowed for Hinchey to establish himself there.

He died in St. Louis, Missouri on August 22, 1865.
