= Errol Trzebinski =

British writer (1936–2025)

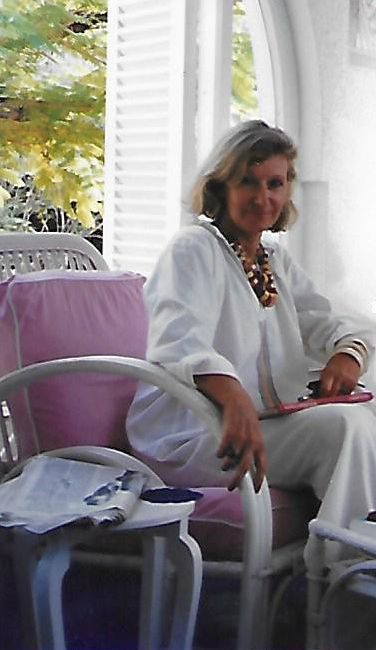
- Trzebinski in 2017
- Born: Eryl Jones; 24 June 1936 Brockworth, Gloucestershire, England
- Died: 12 July 2025 (aged 89) Lamu, Lamu County, Kenya
- Occupation: Writer
- Period: 1977–2000
- Subject: Cookery; Non-fiction
- Spouse: Sbish Trzebinski (died 2005)
- Children: 3, including Tonio and Gabriela (Note: 2 deceased)

Signature
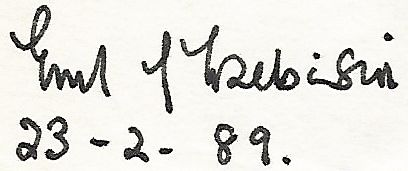

Errol Georgia Trzebinski (born Eryl Jones; 24 June 1936 – 12 July 2025) was a British writer.

== Early life and education ==
Trzebinski was born Eryl Jones on 24 June 1936 in Brockworth, Gloucester, the elder of two daughters of Kathleen and Fred Jones, a BOAC engineer. She was educated at a convent in Wimbourne, Dorset. Her parents separated and at the age of 16 she followed her mother to Nairobi, where she trained as a nurse. She married young, had a son and divorced. She met and married a Polish architect, Sbish Trzebinski and they had two children, Tonio and Gabriela.

== Career ==
Trzebinski wrote and published cookery books in Kenya and Australia, She worked as an advertising manager and interior designer, and designed the interiors of a hotel in Dar es Salaam. She wrote a series of books on the Happy Valley set of colonial Kenya. Her first book, Silence Will Speak (1977), was a source for the script of the 1985 Hollywood movie Out of Africa. Her late husband, Sbish Trzebinski, appeared as a drunkard in the film who is slapped by Karen (Meryl Streep) when he insults her.

In 1993, Trzebinski disputed Beryl Markham's status as the author of her memoir West with the Night and claimed that it was a collaboration between Markham and her third husband Raoul Schumacher, the primary author of the work as a ghostwriter, where he assisted her with the book's form, organization and prose.

== Personal life and death ==
Trzebinski lived and worked in Lamu Island, Kenya. Her daughter is the artist Gabriela Trzebinski. One of her children was the painter Tonio Trzebinski, who was murdered in Kenya in 2001. Her other son Bruce died from a long illness in 2023.

Trzebinski died in Lamu on 12 July 2025, at the age of 89.

== Works ==
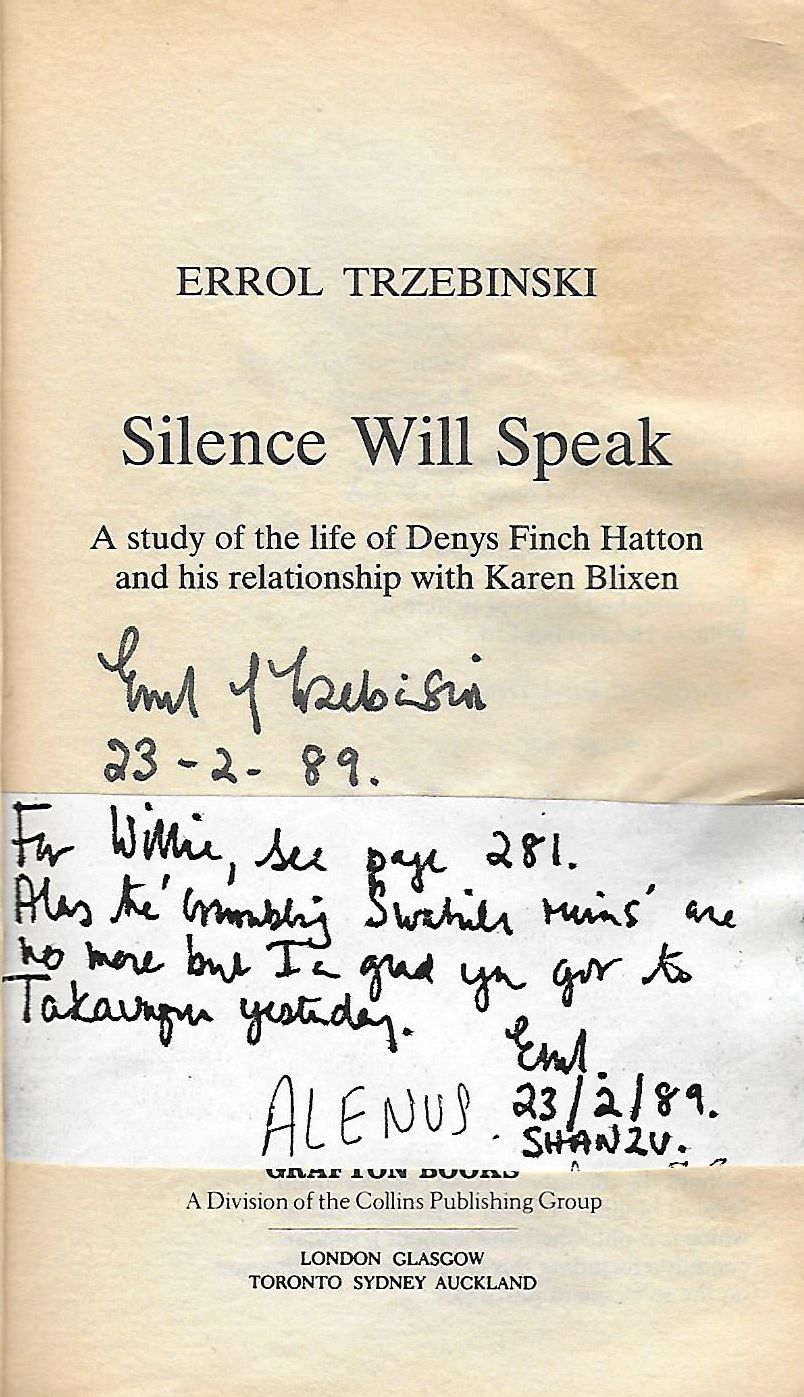
The title page of Silence Will Speak. Accompanied by an autograph, the note dated 23 February 1989 reads: "For Willie, see page 281. Alas the 'mambrui Swahili ruins' are no more but I'm glad you got to Takaungu yesterday." Written for "Alenus" in Shanzu.

- Silence Will Speak: A Study of the Life of Denys Finch Hatton and His Relationship With Karen Blixen (1977);
- The Kenya Pioneers: The Frontiersmen of an Adopted Land (1985);
- The Lives of Beryl Markham: Out of Africa's Hidden Free Spirit and Denys Finch Hatton's Last Great Love (1993);
- The Life and Death of Lord Erroll: The Truth Behind the Happy Valley Murder (2000).

== See also ==
- Karen Blixen
- Denys Finch Hatton
- Beryl Markham
- Josslyn Hay, 22nd Earl of Erroll
