= Una Deerbon =

Australian studio potter (1882–1972)

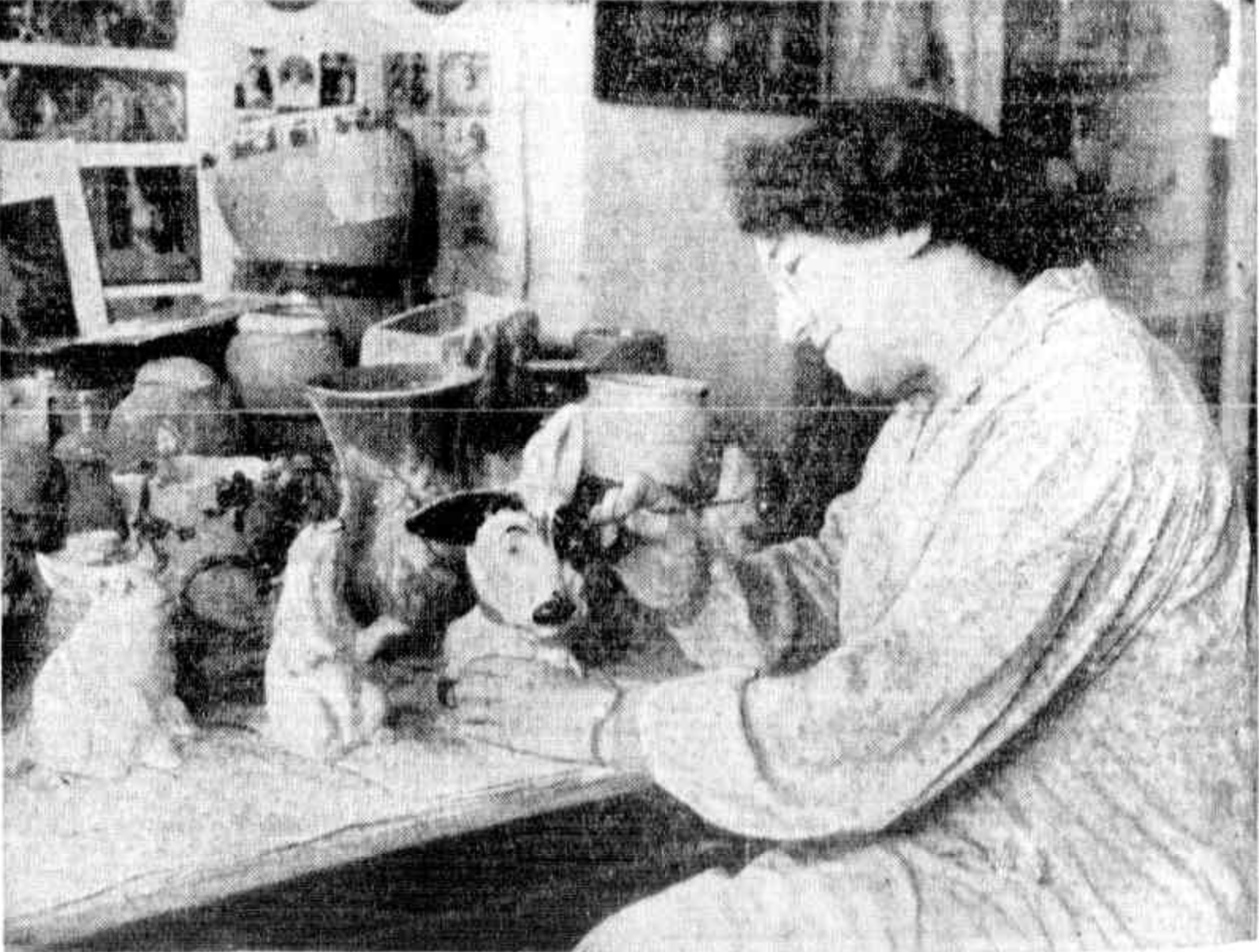
- Born: 1882; Woollahra
- Died: 12 July 1972
- Education: Slade School of Fine Art, Julian Ashton Art School
- Occupations: Potter, ceramist

Una Deerbon (1882–1972) was an Australian studio potter in the early twentieth century. She was uniquely able as a woman potter in that period to support herself and her family.

== Personal ==
Deerbon was born Una Clare Eden Deane in Woollahra, New South Wales on 16 February 1882. She married in 1904 Northumberland-born businessman George Percival Darlow alias Richard Relton Wise (1877–1955) who, as Lieutenant Darlow, was wounded in France in 1918. As a married woman Una studied at the Sydney Art School under Julian Ashton and Rayner Hoff at East Sydney Technical College.

From 1913 to 1915 she reportedly studied in New York, Chicago, Paris and in London at the Slade School.

In England she had a daughter, Joan Diana Cynthia Darlow, known as Diana Wise-Darlow (1915–2001). Una returned to Sydney to work as an artist and fashion designer for David Jones. She subsequently started her own fashion studio, exhibiting at David Jones and Anthony Hordern under the name Una Darlow (sometimes Darlot). She also published humorous postcards. The Darlows divorced in 1920.

In the early 1920s Una moved to Brisbane and started to train as a potter. She met Czech economist Karel Jelinek there in 1922 and they married in 1924 after he had changed his name to Charles Francis Deerbon. They had a son in Sydney, Murray Karel Francis Deerbon (1925–2005). This marriage also collapsed: Deerbon moved to the United States, leaving Una a single mother of two children having to make a living teaching pottery.

== Pottery ==
Una, as Mrs Una Deerbon, showed her own pots in 1931 at the annual exhibition of the New South Wales Society of Arts and Crafts. In 1933 she showed over 200 pieces of pottery at Anthony Hordern's gallery. The Sydney Morning Herald found that

The variety both of the forms and of the surface decorations is remarkable. It is only to be expected that the quality of the work done by so adventurous a craftswoman should be uneven. Some of the pieces display admirable delicacy of form, and are decorated in an amusing style. In some pieces there has been less success, particularly in the colour schemes, but all of them are patently the work of an exceedingly enterprising and vigorous potter.

In the same year she brought a collection of 100 ceramics to Melbourne for an exhibition at the Myer Emporium. Typically her pieces consisted of basic bowls, vases or jugs carrying a decoration of hard-glazed earthenware flora or fauna: leaves, daisies, frogs, polar bears … in great variety and profusion.

In 1934 she moved with her children to Melbourne and established the Una Deerbon School of Pottery in Collins Street. In 1937 she moved from the city to South Yarra and took her school with her; a "small factory" called Deerbon Pottery was set up there by Una and her daughter Diana in 1938. In 1939 she was principal of the Home Industries School of Design, also in Collins Street. She stayed in Melbourne for the rest of her career, still showing her work into the 1960s. She exhibited frequently at Myer, at Georges and at the Ridell Gallery.

She died at ninety on 12 July 1972 at Boronia, Victoria.

== Legacy ==
Among potters who attended her school were John Castle-Harris (a cousin) and Eric Juckert.

Her work is held in various public collections: the Australian National Gallery, the Powerhouse Museum in Sydney, the National Gallery of Victoria, the Shepparton Art Museum, the Ballarat Art Gallery and the Melbourne College of the Arts.

Since 2010 her work has fetched high prices at auction.

Colour photos of Deerbon's work can be seen here: "A name to remember — Una Deerbon". The Accidental Collector. 22 May 2016.
