= Ray Carofano =

American photographer

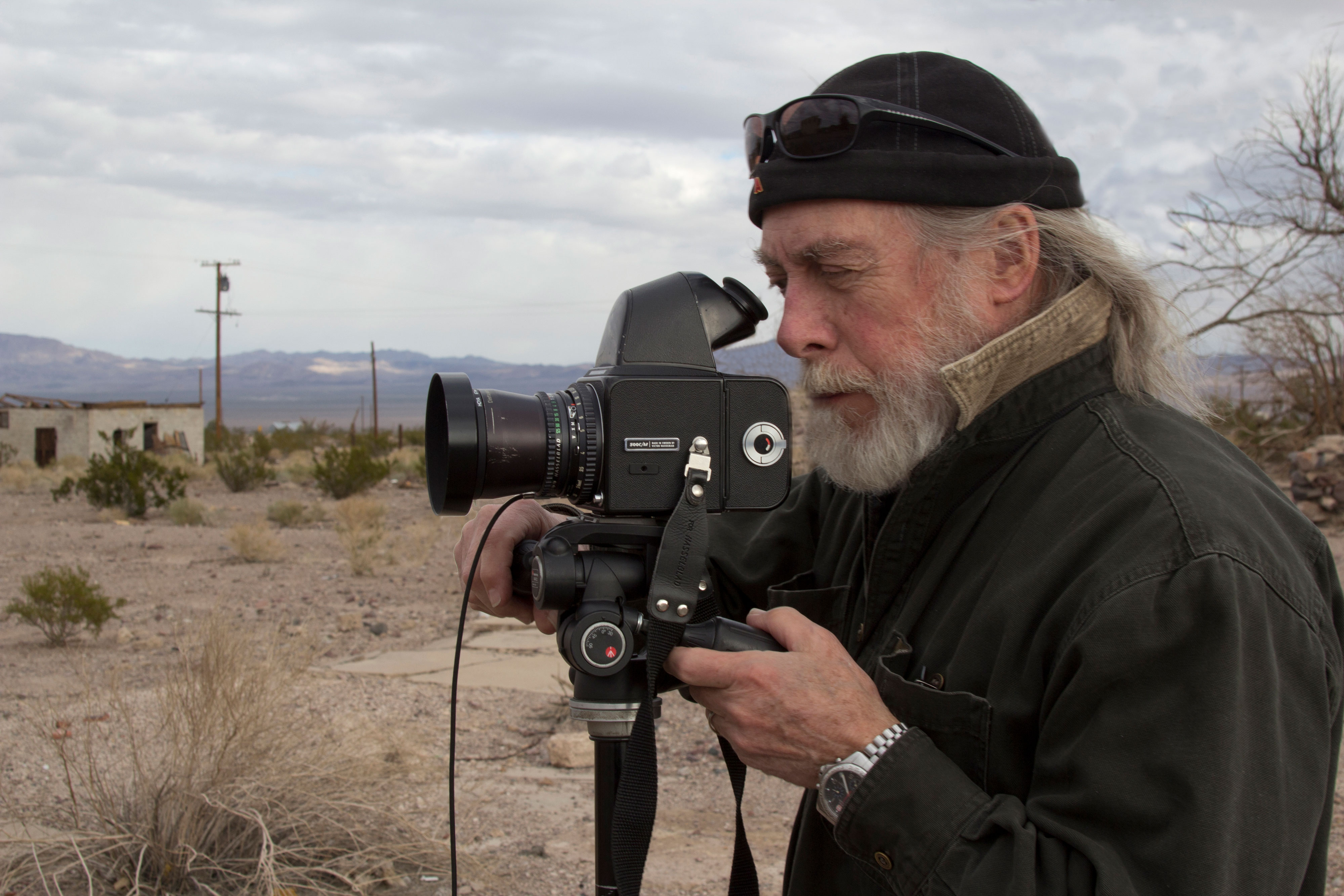
- Born: December 7, 1942; New Haven, Connecticut
- Known for: Art photography
- Spouse: Arnée Carofano
- Website: http://carofano.com/

Ray Carofano (born December 7, 1942) is an American photographer who lives and works in the Los Angeles port town of San Pedro.

== Life and work ==
Carofano was born on December 7, 1942 in New Haven, Connecticut.

Carofano's career in photography spans over fifty years. It was first a hobby, then a passion and finally a profession. His self-education in photography began at an early age when his parents gave him the complete set of The Encyclopedia of Photography. He studied at Quinnipiac College, Southern Connecticut State College and Paier School of Art.

In 1969 he started Ray Carofano Photography Inc., specializing in product photography with special effects. When he wasn't shooting ads and brochures for clients he was doing his own personal work. In 1991 he began focusing more on fine art work and less on commercial work.

Carofano's early work was mostly street photography - marginalized people on the fringes of society inspired by the sight of railroad "hobos" he had witnessed as a boy. In 1998 he began Faces of Pedro, formal studio portraits of local "characters". Bill Kouwenhoven, contributing editor to HotShoe Magazine, wrote; "Ray’s portraits are haunted by the haggard visages and dark shadings that speak of those moving through long nights looking for something that was, and might never be again." Carofano's decades-long Faces of Pedro reflects his ongoing engagement with this early passion.

Carofano's subjects have shifted during his career, beginning with figurative subjects - even human feet - and moving towards landscapes and the Mojave Desert. The desert, and the detritus left by inhabitants long gone, started in 1993 and is on going. Broken Dreams, the 23-year project, examines the disconnect between the American dream of independence and the realities of social isolation. These subjects were further explored in his series Terrene and High Tension. The Terrene photographs reveal Carofano's penchant for documenting the environment as it cycles from life to death, desolation to renewal. His most recent work, riverrun, shot entirely in color, documents the Los Angeles River.

== Criticism and commentary ==
In 2014, in Looking at Images, Brooks Jensen wrote about Carofano's Mystical Transformation photo series: "His highlights are sharp and precise, while the shadows are diffused. He combines the fully conscious and the deeply subconscious in his graphical images."

Karen Sinsheimer, curator of the Santa Barbara Museum of Art, described Carofano's work this way: "Whether the subject matter is of the human body, man-made structures or nature, Ray Carofano’s images are anything but commonplace. An artist who works solely with the camera, his subjects are reality-based yet he renders them with fresh vision. His indeterminate, desolate landscapes of matter mostly burnt, dying or dead are profoundly evocative, depending on the “psyche” of the viewer. To some, they suggest tranquil beauty, to others mystery and death. Carofano's landscapes seem infused with metaphysical meaning."

Carol McCusker, curator of the Harn Museum of Art, wrote: "In Carofano’s photography is a sense of deep time, history, erosion, decay, passage and renewal. He takes these abstract ideas and literally allows them to abstract the things he is drawn to. The edges of his world blur, creating images at once literal and metaphoric, apocalyptic and expectant. They are transcendent, reconciling the forces of nature with man’s optimistic attempt at permanence; within each a recurring cycle of cultural death and exultant rebirth."

Sheridan V. Merritt, Professor Emeritus, University of La Verne, in his catalog essay for riverrun at the Irene Carlson Gallery of Photography, wrote: "I must admit, when I began viewing Ray Carofano’s images of the Los Angeles Flood Channel I did not expect—did not intend—to find beauty, tenderness, resilience, or reason for optimism there. I was pleasantly surprised. For example, using the concrete channel walls and floor as backdrop and reflective sheets of water as mirrors, Carofano captures haunting kaleidoscopic images that lift the virtual conversation above the mundane coarseness of rebar, concrete slabs, and engineering genius to the possibility of transformation, even restoration."

== Publications ==
- Chronicle Books, Two of a Kind, 2016
- Looking at Images, 2014
- LensWork, 2013
- Photography and the Art of Digital Printing, 2006
- Creative Visions, 2005
- Photographer’s Forum, 2004
- Black & White Magazine, 2002
- Museum Portfolio, SBMA, 2001
- Photo Metro News, 1999
- Photo Metro News, 1998
- Camera Arts, 1998
- LensWork, 1997
- Studio Photography, 1985
- Photography Annual, 1973
- 35mm Photography, 1973
- Camera, 1972
- Photography Annual, 1972

== Collections ==
- Museum of Photographic Arts, San Diego, CA
- Fototeca de Cuba, Nat’l Archives, Havana, Cuba
- Santa Barbara Museum of Art, Santa Barbara, CA
- Museum of Fine Arts, Houston, TX
- University of Texas at Austin, Austin, TX
- Private and corporate collections throughout the U.S. and abroad

== Exhibitions ==
=== Solo exhibitions ===
- 2016: riverrun, Irene Carlson Gallery of Photography, ULV, La Verne, CA
- 2015: riverrun, Warschaw Gallery, San Pedro, CA2012
- 2012: Time Out of Mind, LAHC Fine Arts Gallery, Wilmington, CA
- 2006: Terrene, Couturier Gallery, Los Angeles, CA
- 2006: Terrene, Warschaw Gallery, San Pedro, CA
- 2006: Ray Carofano, Medea Gallery, San Pedro, CA
- 2004: Ray Carofano, Fototeca de Cuba, Havana, Cuba
- 2004: Ray Carofano /10 years, El Camino Collage, Torrance, CA
- 2003: Ray Carofano, Gallery Saintonage, Missoula, MT
- 2003: Personal Alchemies, Photographic Image Gallery, Portland, OR
- 2003: Faces of Pedro, Cypress College Gallery, Cypress, CA
- 2003: Personal Alchemies Couturier Gallery, Los Angeles, CA
- 2002: terra phantasma, Museum of Photographic Art, San Diego, CA
- 2002: Ray Carofano, Photographic Image Gallery, Portland, OR
- 2001: X-Section, Couturier Gallery, Los Angeles, CA
- 2001: Mystical Transformations, Benham Gallery, Seattle, WA
- 2000: X-Section, LA Harbor College, Los Angeles, CA
- 1999: Ray Carofano, Irene Carlson Gallery, Miller Hall, ULV, La Verne, CA
- 1999: Mystical Transformations, Galera de Arde Fotografo, San Miguel Allende, MX
- 1999: Ray Carofano, Gallery 215, Santa Ana, CA
- 1997: Mystical Transformation, Lallak + Tom Gallery, Chicago, IL
- 1997: Ray Carofano, Photographic Image Gallery, Portland, OR
- 1996: Ray Carofano, Level 3 Gallery, Huntsville, TX
- 1996: Ray Carofano, Southern Light Gallery, Amarillo, TX

=== Group exhibitions ===
- 2015: 2016 Warschaw / Winter II, Warschaw Gallery, San Pedro, CA
- 2014: Warschaw / Winter, Warschaw Gallery, San Pedro, CA.
- 2012: PSST: Art in San Pedro 2000 – 2012, Warschaw Gallery, San Pedro, CA.
- 2011: Peripheral Visions, John Wayne Airport, Santa Ana, CA
- 2008: Sea Change Redux, Board Room Gallery, San Pedro, CA
- 2007: Sampler, Warschaw Gallery, San Pedro, CA
- 2005: Ray Carofano, Istanbul Int. Contemporary Art Expo., Istanbul, Turkey
- 2005: Golden States, Staton-Greenberg Gallery, Santa Barbara, CA
- 2004: New Directions, Santa Ana College, Santa Ana, CA
- 2004: Incognito, Santa Monica Museum of Art, Santa Monica, CA
- 2003: Coasts, Staton-Greenberg Gallery, Santa Barbara, CA
- 2003: P.O.V.- Two Photographers, LAHC Fine Arts Gallery, Wilmington, CA
- 2002: Land, Staton-Greenberg, Santa Barbara, CA
- 2002: Ray Carofano, Photographic Image Gallery, Portland, OR
- 2001: Friends of the West, Santa Barbara Museum of Art, Santa Barbara, CA
- 2001: Present Art VII, Couturier Gallery, Los Angeles, CA
- 2000: Ray Carofano, SRO Photo Gallery, Lubbock, TX
- 2000: Director’s Choice, Portland State Univ., Portland, OR
- 2000: The New Pictorialist, Photographic Image Gallery, Portland, OR
- 2000: Director’s Choice, Art Center of the Ozarks, Springdale, AR
- 2000: The Salton Sea, Gallery 215, Santa Ana, CA
- 1999: Ray Carofano, Studio 202, Redondo Beach, CA
- 1999: Present Art VII, Couturier Gallery, Los Angeles, CA
- 1999: First Anniversary, Gallery 215, Santa Ana, CA
- 1999: Ray Carofano, Couturier Gallery, Los Angeles, CA
- 1999: New Definitions in Photography, Photographic Image Gallery, Portland, OR
- 1998: Ray Carofano, Patricia Owens Gallery, Montecito, CA
- 1998: Tales of Los Angeles, Couturier Gallery, Los Angeles, CA
- 1997: Ray Carofano, Photo Americas, Tulsa, OK
- 1997: Images of Emilio, Studio 202, Redondo Beach, CA
- 1997: New Voices, Photographic Image Gallery, Portland, OR
- 1997: Ray Carofano, Tulsa Performing Arts Gallery, Tulsa, OK
- 1997: New Acquisitions, Photographs Do Not Bend, Dallas, TX
- 1997: Nature Redux, Harris Art Gallery, La Verne, CA
- 1997: Ray Carofano, M.A. Doran Gallery, Tulsa, OK
- 1996: Ray Carofano, Photo Metro Gallery, San Francisco, CA
- 1996: Ray Carofano, Channing Peak Gallery, Santa Barbara, CA
- 1996: Ray Carofano, Photographic Image Gallery, Portland, OR
- 1995: Ray Carofano, G. Ray Hawkins Gallery, Santa Monica, CA
