= Great Women Masters of Art =

Reference work first published in 2003

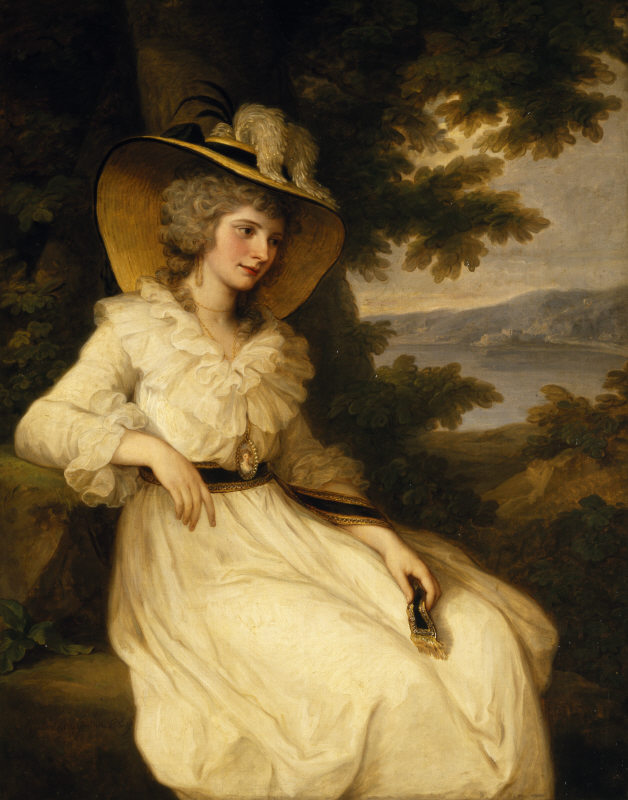
- Portrait of Lady Elizabeth Foster, by Angelica Kauffman, page 142
- Author: Jordi Vigué
- Language: English language
- Genre: Art history
- Publisher: Watson-Guptill, New York
- Publication date: 2003
- OCLC: 53282165

Great Women Masters of Art is a 2003 reference work assembled and edited by the art historian Jordi Vigué, on women painters through the ages.

The preface of the book declares its motivation to fill the "lagoons of oblivion and contradicting opinions" regarding women's art. It confesses immediately the difficulties of handling such a broad subject, but after a short overview of women painters through the ages, it settles on the following list of women, where each entry includes a few illustrations:

== List of women in the book ==
Name	Nationality	Date of birth	Date of death	Image	Listed on page
Catharina van Hemessen	Netherlands	1528	1600s		33
Sofonisba Anguissola	Italy	1535s	1625-11-16		39
Lucia Anguissola	Duchy of Milan	1536	1565		45
Lavinia Fontana		1552-08-24	1614-08-11		49
Barbara Longhi	Italy	1552-10-01	1638-12-23		55
Fede Galizia	Duchy of Milan	1578	1630		59
Artemisia Gentileschi		1593-07-08	1653; 1652		65
Clara Peeters	Dutch Republic; Southern Netherlands	1594	1657		71
Giovanna Garzoni		1600	1670		77
Michaelina Wautier	Spanish Netherlands	1604	1689		91
Anna Maria van Schurman	Dutch Republic; Belgium	1607-11-05	1678-05		81
Judith Leyster	Netherlands	1609-07-28	1660-02-10		85
Louise Moillon	France	1610	1696-12-20		97
Josefa de Óbidos	Portugal; Spain	1630-02-20	1684-07-22		103
Maria van Oosterwijck	Dutch Republic	1630-08-20	1693-11-12		109
Mary Beale	Kingdom of England	1633-03-26	1699		115
Elisabetta Sirani		1638-01-08	1665-08-25		119
Maria Sibylla Merian	Dutch Republic	1647-04-02	1717-01-13		125
Rachel Ruysch	Netherlands	1664-06-03	1750-08-12		129
Rosalba Carriera	Republic of Venice	1675-10-07	1757-04-15		135
Angelica Kauffman	Switzerland; United Kingdom of Great Britain and Ireland	1741-10-30	1807-11-05		141
Anne Vallayer-Coster	France; United Kingdom of Great Britain and Ireland; Great Britain	1744-12-21	1818-02-28		147
Adélaïde Labille-Guiard	France	1749-04-11	1803-04-24		153
Marie-Victoire Lemoine	France	1754	1820-12-02		159
Élisabeth Louise Vigée Le Brun	France	1755-04-16	1842-03-30		163
Marguerite Gérard	France	1761-01-28	1837-05-18		173
Marie-Gabrielle Capet	France	1761-09-06	1818-11-01		169
Constance Mayer	France	1774-03-09; 1775	1821-05-26		177
Marie-Éléonore Godefroid	France	1778-06-20	1849-06		183
Rosa Bonheur	France	1822-03-16	1899-05-25		187
Lilly Martin Spencer	United States of America	1822-11-26	1902-05-22		193
Sophie Gengembre Anderson	France; United Kingdom of Great Britain and Ireland	1823	1903-03-10		197
Elizabeth Siddal	United Kingdom	1829-07-25	1862-02-11		203
Marianne North	United Kingdom of Great Britain and Ireland	1830-10-24	1890-08-30		209
Joanna Mary Boyce	United Kingdom of Great Britain and Ireland	1831-12-07	1861-07-15		215
Rebecca Solomon	United Kingdom of Great Britain and Ireland	1832-09-26	1886-11-20		219
Elizabeth Jane Gardner	United States of America	1837-10-04	1922-01-28		223
Marie Bracquemond	France	1840-12-01	1916-01-17		227
Berthe Morisot	France	1841-01-14	1895-03-02		233
Emma Sandys	United Kingdom	1843	1877-11		239
Lucy Madox Brown	United Kingdom of Great Britain and Ireland	1843-07-19	1894-04-12		243
Kitty Lange Kielland	Norway	1843-10-08	1914-10-01		247
Mary Cassatt	United States of America	1844-05-22	1926-06-14		251
Fanny Churberg	Grand Duchy of Finland	1845-12-12	1892-05-10		257
Anna Boch	France; Belgium	1848-02-10	1936-02-25		263
Eva Gonzalès	France	1849-04-19	1883-05-05		267
Laura Theresa Alma-Tadema	United Kingdom of Great Britain and Ireland	1852-04-16	1909-08-15		273
Cecilia Beaux	United States of America	1855-05-01	1942-09-17		287
Evelyn De Morgan	United Kingdom of Great Britain and Ireland	1855-08-30	1919-05-02		277
Suze Robertson	Kingdom of the Netherlands	1855-12-17	1922-10-18		283
Elizabeth Forbes	United Kingdom of Great Britain and Ireland	1859-12-29	1912-03-16		299
Marianne von Werefkin	Russian Empire <no value>	1860-09-10	1938-02-06		305
Marie Bashkirtseff	Russian Empire; France	1860-11-11	1884-10-31		293
Mary Lizzie Macomber	United States of America	1861-08-21	1916-02-04		311
Elin Danielson-Gambogi	Finland	1861-09-03	1919-12-31		315
Suzanne Valadon	France	1865-09-23	1938-04-07		325
Margaret MacDonald	United Kingdom; United Kingdom of Great Britain and Ireland	1865-11-05	1933-01-10; 1933-01-07		321
Louise De Hem	Belgium	1866-12-10	1922-11-22		331
Käthe Kollwitz	Weimar Republic; Germany	1867-07-08	1945-04-22		335
Frances MacDonald	United Kingdom of Great Britain and Ireland	1873-08-24	1921-12-12		341
Paula Modersohn-Becker	German Empire; Germany	1876-02-08	1907-11-30		347
Lluïsa Vidal	Spain	1876-04-02	1918-10-18		353
Gabriele Münter	Germany	1877-02-19	1962-05-19		359
Helen McNicoll	Canada	1879-12-14	1915-06-27		365
Natalia Goncharova	Russian Empire; France	1881-06-21; 1881-06-04; 1881-07-03	1962-10-17		369
Sonia Delaunay	France	1885-11-14; 1885	1979-12-05; 1979		381
Olga Rozanova	Russian Empire; Russian Soviet Federative Socialist Republic	1886-06-21	1918-11-07		375
Georgia O'Keeffe	United States of America	1887-11-15	1986-03-06		387
Lyubov Popova	Soviet Union; Russian Empire	1889-04-24	1924-05-25		393
Tamara de Lempicka	Russian Empire; Poland	1898-05-16	1980-03-18		399
Alice Neel	United States of America	1900-01-28	1984-10-13		405
Frida Kahlo	Mexico	1907-07-06	1954-07-13		411
Leonor Fini	Argentina	1908-08-30	1996-01-18		421
Lee Krasner	United States of America	1908-10-27	1984-06-19		417
Nell Blaine	United States of America	1922-07-10	1996-11-14		427
Helen Frankenthaler	United States of America	1928-12-17; 1928-12-12	2011-12-27		431
Faith Ringgold	United States of America	1930-10-08			437
Montserrat Gudiol	Spain	1933-06-09; 1933-09-06	2015-12-25		443
Judy Chicago	United States of America	1939-07-20			449
Emilia Castañeda Martínez	Spain	1943-11-07			455
Glòria Muñoz	Spain	1949-08-12			461
Jenny Saville	United Kingdom	1970			467
