= List of 19th-century British children's literature illustrators =

This is a list of 19th-century British children's literature illustrators (ordered by year of birth):

- George Cruikshank (1792–1878)
- Edward Lear (1812–1888)
- John Tenniel (1820–1914)
- Thomas Dalziel (1823–1906)
- Richard Doyle (1824–1883)
- Eleanor Vere Boyle (1825–1916)
- Sydney Prior Hall (1842–1922)
- Thomas Crane (1843–1903)
- Walter Crane (1845–1915)
- Kate Greenaway (1846–1901)
- Randolph Caldecott (1846–1886)
- John George Sowerby (1850–1914)
- Gordon Browne (1858–1932)
- Beatrix Potter (1866–1943)
- Arthur Rackham (1867–1939)
- H. R. Millar (1869–1940)
- John Hancock (1896–1918)
