= Gabriela Trzebinski =

- Born: 1962 (age 63–64); Nairobi Kenya
- Citizenship: Based in Houston, Texas, United States.
- Education: Byam Shaw School of Art, London, (1988) Southampton College of Art, Hampshire, England, (1987)
- Occupations: Artist, Painters and Designer
- Notable work: A solo exhibition with the Rebecca Hossack Gallery 2000. Her film My Beautiful Violetta, a collaboration with London musician Sarah Sarhandi in 2003.
- Mother: Errol Trzebinski( née Eryl Jones)

Gabriela Trzebinski (born 1962) is an African artist of European heritage based in Houston, Texas, United States.

== Family and early life ==
Gabriela Trzebinski was born in Nairobi, Kenya, one of three children, her brothers are named Bruce and Tonio. Her British mother, the writer Errol Trzebinski, who was born Eryl Jones had changed her first name when she married a Polish architect, Sbish (Zbigniew, Waclaw) Trzebinski (died 15 March 2005).

From early childhood, issues of cross culture, race and gender have concerned Trzebinski.

Gabriela attended Byam Shaw School of Art, London, (1988) and Southampton College of Art, Hampshire, England, (1987).

== Art ==
In 1995, Gabriela Trzebinski worked both as painter & designer.

In 2000, Trzebinski had a solo exhibition with the Rebecca Hossack Gallery . Later that year, the Rebecca Hossack Gallery represented Trzebinski at artLondon at the Duke of York's Headquarters. Her film My Beautiful Violetta, a collaboration with London musician Sarah Sarhandi was a ten-minute digitised Super 8 film, shown at the Portobello Film Festival, London, in 2003.

A solo show, Gabriela Trzebinski:New Paintings and the "Matatu" Project, took place in 2006 at the George Adams Gallery, New York. In October 2006, she was in the group show, Run for Your Lives! at DiverseWorks, Houston, with paintings depicted in a primitive manner, for example incidents of disaster and war on television screens. One painting ironically titled Clijsters ruled out of U.S. Open shows text on the bottom (in the manner of scrolling news) over an image of blood-spattered walls from a CNN report on the bombing of Beirut. Headlines and logos were similarly incorporated in other subjects, amongst which were U.N. tanks in Rwanda and the disaster zone after Hurricane Katrina. The painting executed in 2006 showed the Lost Boys of Sudan looking out of an aeroplane's windows as the young refugees from Sudan arrived in the United States in 2000.

In December 2007, Trzebinski was one of five artists invited by curator & artist Michael Guidry to exhibit items they prized in the show, Little Known Facts, at the Lawndale Art Center by recreating an area of their studio. She filled the wall space with newspaper cuttings, many of which related to Africa, and also displayed some artwork, resulting in a "fascinating and poignant insider's take" on both Trzebinski's African upbringing and life in the United States as a white African.

In April 2008, she took part at the Contemporary Arts Museum Houston in "Slide Jam", a monthly presentation by the museum's education program. Houston Area Exhibition of the best local Houston artists, held every four years at the Blaffer Gallery on campus at the University of Houston. Her brutal imagery, derived from her intense experiences of multiculturalism in Africa, showed political oppression, sex, mutilation and death. My Daddy Is a Tranny, discusses old Swahili customs in reference to yearly festivities and the occasional ambiguous dress code of street performers along the East African Kenyan coast, namely on the island of Lamu.

In 2008, Trzebinski was one of the people honored at the tenth anniversary annual fundraising dinner of the Aurora Picture Show, Houston, for their support and influence.

In Disturbance of Distance, a show curated by Eleanor Williams at the art space Box 13, Houston, in February 2009, Trzebinski showed The Burning of Hides, a newly re-edited Super-8 film of a burning pyre of animal hides and game trophies. This controversial event took place in Nairobi National Park, on the outskirts of Nairobi's city center, Kenya. In 1989 as a government's protest against the widespread poaching of wildlife, administrators arranged the destruction of all game trophies that were held in storage. Prior to this the Kenyan government burnt the ivory of over 2000 elephant at the same venue and for the same reason.
