= Jean-Baptiste Veyren =

18th-century French locksmith and ironworker

- Born: Jean-Baptiste Veyren; 25 December 1707; Villeneuve-de-Berg, Ardèche, Rhône-Alpes, France
- Died: 9 April 1788 (aged 80); Corbie, Somme, Picardy, France
- Occupations: Locksmith, ironworker
- Spouses: Marie-Jeanne Papillon; Marie-Louise Euvremer-Duval
- Parent(s): Jacques Veyrenc; Anne Amblard

Jean-Baptiste Veyren (a.k.a. Jean Veyren) (1707-1788) was a French locksmith and ironworker.

== Early life ==
Jean-Baptiste Veyren was born on 25 December 1707 in Villeneuve-de-Berg, in the Ardèche, rural Southern France. His father, Jacques Veyrenc, was a master locksmith. His mother was the former Anne Amblard.

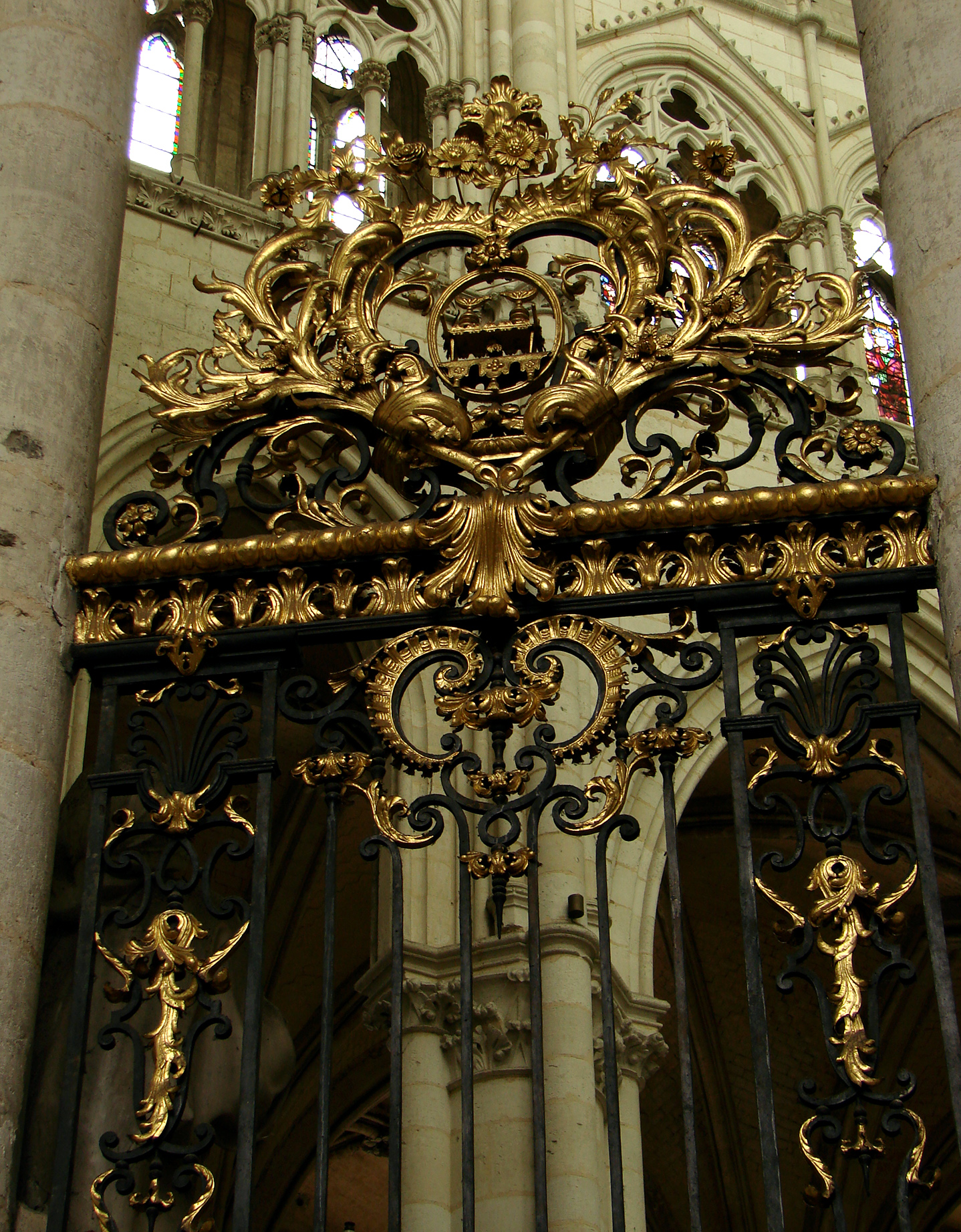
Chancel rail inside the Amiens Cathedral, designed by Veyren.

== Career ==
He designed ironworks for the Valloires Abbey in Argoules, Somme. He also designed the chancel rail inside the Amiens Cathedral.

He designed an ironwork gate for the Château d'Heilly, which was moved to the Château de Bertangles in 1840. He also designed the gate of the Château d'Hénencourt.

== Personal life ==
He married Marie-Jeanne Papillon on 8 January 1737 in Fouilloy. She died in 1745. He was married secondly to Marie-Louise Euvremer-Duval on 3 October 1747.

== Death ==
He died on 9 April 1788.
