= Roger de Piles' artists from France =

Roger de Piles's L'Abrégé de la vie des peintres...avec un traité du peintre parfait (The Art of Painting and the Lives of the Painters), was a major art biography of painters. It was written by the French spy Roger de Piles. In 1692, during the War of the League of Augsburg, he was arrested in the Hague carrying a false passport and imprisoned for the next five years, where he wrote his L'Abrégé in 7 parts; 1) Sketch of the perfect painter, 2) Greek painters; 3) Painters from Rome & Florence; 4) Painters from Venice; 5) Painters from Lombardy; 6) Painters from Germany and the Low Countries; 7) Painters from France and ending with his famous "Balance of painters". The book was finally published in 1699 following his appointment as Conseiller Honoraire to the Académie de peinture et de sculpture in Paris.

Part 7, Painters from France, includes in order of appearance in the text, the following list of artists:

- Jean Cousin the Elder (1500–1570), p 447
- Jacob Bunel (1568–1614), p 449
- Toussaint Dubreuil (1561–1602), p 449
- Martin Fréminet (1567–1619), p 449
- Ferdinand Elle (1570–1637), p 450
- Quentin Varin (1584–1647), p 451
- Jacques Blanchard (1600–1638), p 451
- Simon Vouet (1590–1649), p 453
- Nicolas Poussin (1594–1665), p 457
- François Perrier (painter) (1590–1650), p 470
- Jacques Stella (1596–1657), p 472
- Martin de Charmois (1609–1661), p 475
- Eustache Le Sueur (1616–1655), p 477
- Laurent de La Hyre (1606–1656), p 479
- Michel Dorigny (1617–1663), p 483
- Charles Alphonse du Fresnoy (1611–1668), p 483
- Nicolas Mignard (1606–1668), p 490
- Claude Vignon (1593–1670), p 491
- Sébastien Bourdon (1616–1671), p 492
- Simon Francois (1606–1671), p 495
- Philippe de Champaigne (1602–1673), p 497
- Jean Baptiste de Champaigne (1631–1680), p 503
- Nicolas-Pierre Loir (1624–1679), p 504
- Charles Le Brun (1619–1690), p 505
- Pierre Mignard (1612–1695), p 515
- Claude Lorrain (1604–1682), p 521
- Noël Coypel (1628–1707), p 523
- Élisabeth Sophie Chéron (1648–1711), p 532
- Carlo Maratta (1625–1713), p 542
