= Roger de Piles' artists from Germany and the Low Countries =

Art biography of painters

Roger de Piles's L'Abrégé de la vie des peintres...avec un traité du peintre parfait (The Art of Painting and the Lives of the Painters) was a major art biography of painters. It was written by the French spy Roger de Piles. In 1692, during the War of the League of Augsburg, he was arrested in the Hague carrying a false passport and imprisoned for the next five years, where he wrote his L'Abrégé in 7 parts; 1) Sketch of the perfect painter, 2) Greek painters; 3) Painters from Rome & Florence; 4) Painters from Venice; 5) Painters from Lombardy; 6) Painters from Germany and the Low Countries; 7) Painters from France and ending with his famous "Balance of painters". The book was finally published in 1699 following his appointment as Conseiller Honoraire to the Académie de peinture et de sculpture in Paris.

Part 6 includes in order of appearance in the text, the following list of Artists from Germany and the Low Countries:

- Hubert van Eyck (1366–1426), p 334
- Albrecht Dürer (1471–1528), p 336
- Georg Pencz (1500–1550), p 342
- Peter Candid (1548–1628), p 343
- Cornelis Engebrechtsz. (1468–1533), p 343
- Bernard van Orley (1490–1541), p 344
- Michiel Coxie (1499–1592), p 345
- Lucas van Leyden (1494–1533), p 345
- Quentin Matsys (1466–1530), p 347
- Jan van Calcar (1499–1546), p 349
- Pieter Coecke van Aelst (1502–1550), p 350
- Heinrich Aldegrever (1502–1555), p 351
- Jan Mabuse (1478–1532), p 352
- Jan van Scorel (1495–1562), p 354
- Lambert Lombard (1505–1566), p 355
- Hans Holbein the Younger (1497–1543), p 356
- Tobias Stimmer (1539–1584), p 360
- Jan Cornelisz Vermeyen (1500–1559), p 360
- Antonis Mor (1520–1576), p 361
- Pieter Bruegel the Elder (1526–1569), p 362
- Frans Floris (1519–1570), p 363
- Christoph Schwarz (1545–1592), p 364
- Willem Key (1515–1568), p 365
- Hubert Goltzius (1534–1609), p 365
- Pieter Pourbus (1523–1584), p 366
- Dirck Barendsz (1534–1592), p 366
- Hans Bol (1534–1593), p 367
- Maarten van Heemskerck (1498–1574), p 367
- Karel van Mander (1548–1606), p 369
- Marten de Vos (1532–1603), p 370
- Stradanus (1523–1605), p 371
- Bartholomeus Spranger (1546–1611), p 372
- Hendrik Goltzius (1558–1617), p 374
- Hans von Aachen (1552–1614), p 376
- Joseph Heintz the Elder (1564–1609), p 377
- Paul Bril (1554–1626), p 377
- Cornelis van Haarlem (1562–1637), p 378
- Adam van Noort (1561–1641), p 378
- Otto van Veen (1556–1629), p 379
- Hans Rottenhammer (1564–1625), p 381
- Pieter Cornelisz van Rijck (1567–1637), p 382
- Peter Paul Rubens (1577–1640), p 382
- Adam Elsheimer (1578–1610), p 396
- Abraham Bloemaert (1564–1651), p 397
- Hendrik van Steenwijk I (1550–1603), p 398
- Abraham Janssens (1570–1632), p 399
- Gerard Seghers (1591–1651), p 400
- Michiel Jansz. van Mierevelt (1567–1641), p 401
- Cornelis Schut (1597–1655), p 401
- Gerard van Honthorst (1592–1656), p 402
- Anthony van Dyck (1599–1641), p 403
- Adriaen Brouwer (1605–1638), p 408
- Cornelius van Poelenburgh (1595–1667), p 409
- Roelant Savery (1576–1639), p 410
- Johannes van der Beeck (1589–1644), p 410
- Friedrich Brentel (1580–1651), p 411
- Johann Wilhelm Baur (1607–1639), p 411
- Hendrick Goudt (1583–1648), p 412
- David Teniers the Elder (1582–1649), p 413
- Jan van den Hoecke (1611–1651), p 414
- Jacques Fouquier (1590–1659), p 414
- Pieter van Laer (1592–1642), p 415
- Andries Both (1612–1642), p 416
- Daniel Seghers (1590–1661), p 417
- Balthazar Gerbier (1591–1663), p 418
- Herman van Swanevelt (1604–1655), p 418
- George Geldorp (1590–1665), p 419
- Isaac Oliver (1565–1617), p 419
- Peter Lely (1618–1680), p 419
- Cornelis de Heem (1631–1695), p 420
- Abraham van Diepenbeeck (1596–1675), p 420
- David Teniers the Younger (1610–1690), p 420
- Rembrandt (1606–1669), p 421
- Gerrit Dou (1613–1675), p 428
- Frans van Mieris the Elder (1635–1681), p 430
- Adriaen Hanneman (1603–1671), p 431 (Note: in the Dutch translation of 1725, the title of this entry was mistakenly translated as "Lange Jan", referring to Jan Gerritsz van Bronckhorst (1603–1661) instead of Hanneman)
- Jacob Jordaens (1593–1678), p 432
- Erasmus Quellinus II (1607–1678), p 433
- Joachim von Sandrart (1606–1688), p 434
- Hendrik Verschuring (1627–1690), p 437
- Caspar Netscher (1639–1684), p 441
