= Valloires Abbey =

Abbey in Somme, France

Abbaye de Valloires
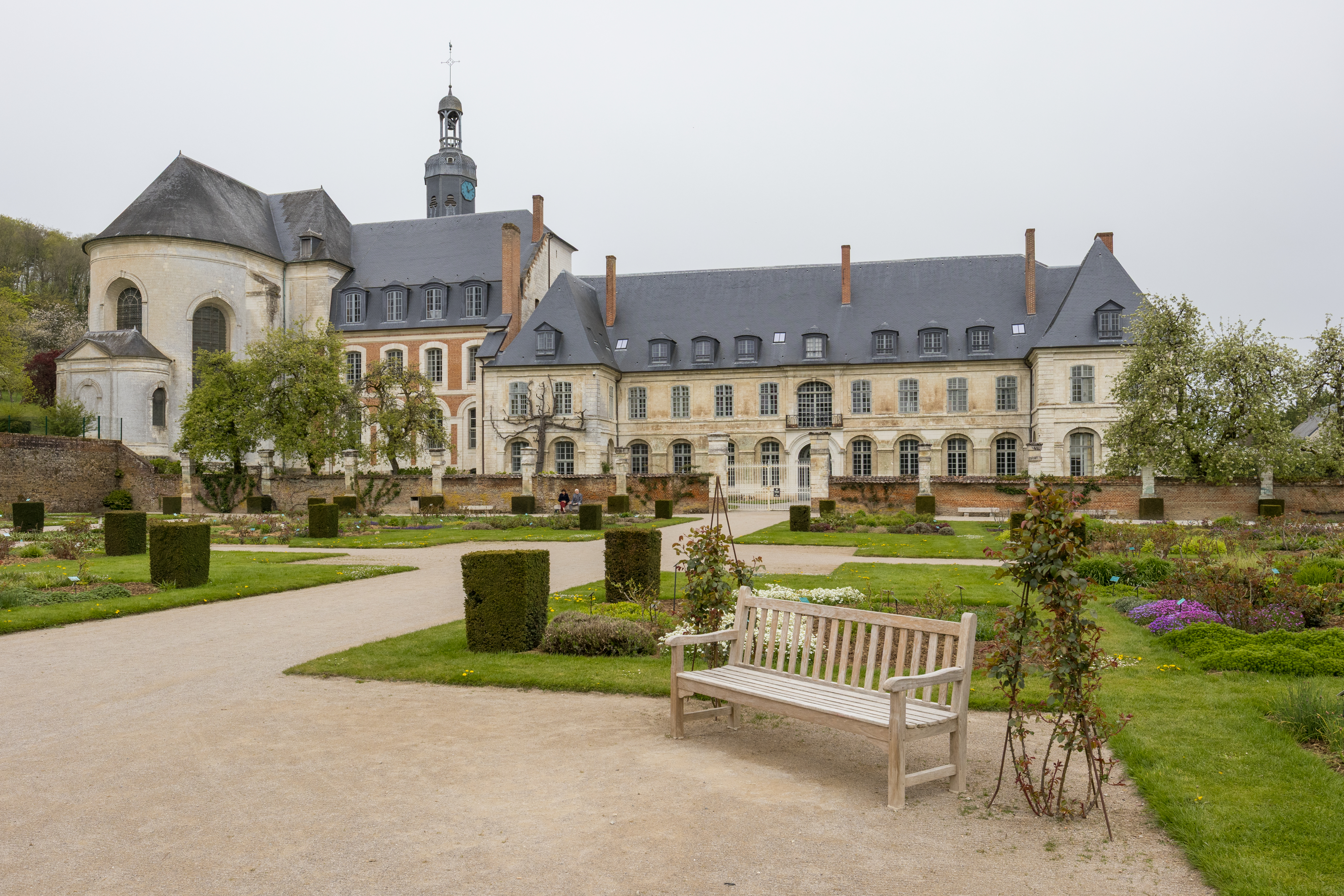

Religion
- Affiliation: Catholic
- Ecclesiastical or organisational status: Abbey
- Year consecrated: 1226

Location
- Location: Argoules, France
- Interactive map of Abbaye de Valloires
- Coordinates: 50.3484°N 1.8188°E

Architecture
- Groundbreaking: 1226
- Completed: 1756

Specifications
- Direction of façade: East
- Length: 49,5 meters
- Width (nave): 9 meters
- Height (max): 16,5 meters

Valloires Abbey is a 12th-century Cistercian abbey situated in the commune of Argoules in the Somme department of France. The Abbey de Valloires is also the burial place of the Comte de Ponthieu with nearly every Count from the 12th to the 14th centuries buried there.

== Early history ==
In 1138, Count Guy II of Ponthieu agreed with Cistercian monks to the foundation of their seventh abbey in France. The monks established themselves at Valloires in the valley of the Authie river in 1158 AD. At the height of its prosperity, in the 12th and 13th centuries, the abbey was home to about one hundred monks. The abbey's wealth allowed the construction of the first abbey in the rib-vaulted style as early as 1226. In the following centuries, especially during the Hundred Years War and the Thirty Years War, the abbey suffered badly because of military operations and pillage. In the aftermath of the nearby Battle of Crécy, injured combatants were brought to the Abbey for medical treatment. By the 17th century, the abbey was largely in ruins. But the abbey was rebuilt, the work being completed around 1730. In 1738, the preserved 13th-century parts of the abbey collapsed and it was necessary to construct a new church. The work began in 1741, to the plans of the architect Raoul Coignard. The internal decoration was entrusted to the Austrian sculptor Simon Pfaff of Pfaffenhoffen and to metal worker Jean-Baptiste Veyren. The new church was consecrated on September 5, 1756. During the Revolution period, the abbey was sold on July 7, 1791, for 271,000 livres to Jourdain de l'Eloge, a local lord from Argoules, thus escaping further damage.

== Recent history ==
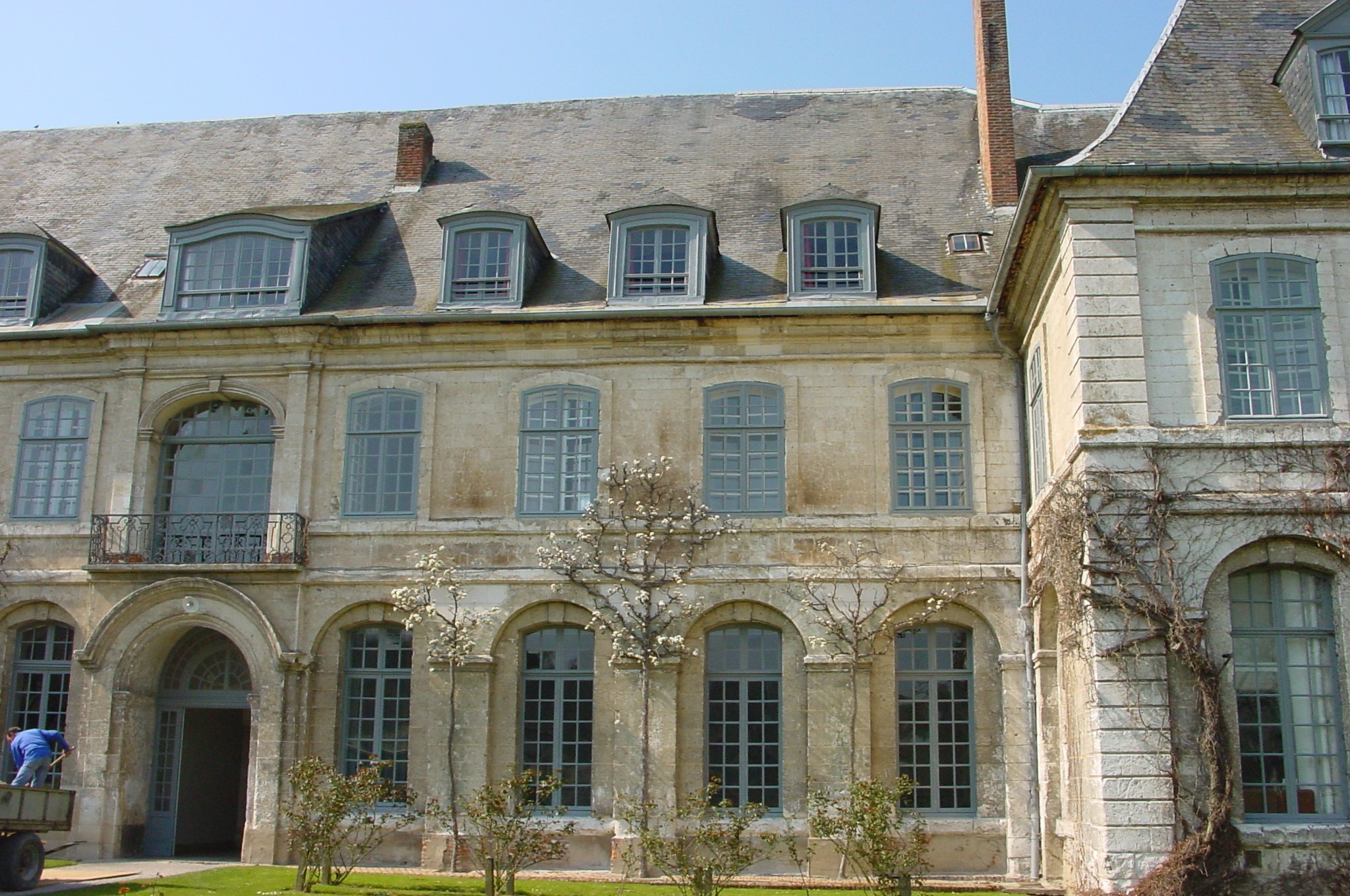
Monks refectory

In 1817, the abbey passed into the care of the lay brotherhood of the Basilians, and subsequently in 1880 to the Society of Saint Vincent de Paul, to be used as an orphanage. Sold again in 1906, it was classified as a historic monument, then abandoned. During World War I it was used as a military hospital.
In 1922, it became a preventorium for children at the instigation of Thérèse Papillon, a young French Red-Cross nurse.

Nowaday the abbey is the property of a non profit association founded in 1922. The main goal of the association de Valloires is to foster children; those remanded by a court into care and children with very complex needs and/or challenging behaviour.

To support its philanthropic work, the Association de Valloires makes the abbey open to paying visitors from March to November. At the same time, its 18th-century suites (originally monastic cells) are open all year round and available as bed-and-breakfast accommodation. From these rooms, above the monks' refectory (illustrated), there are views over the gardens.

== The Gardens of Valloires ==
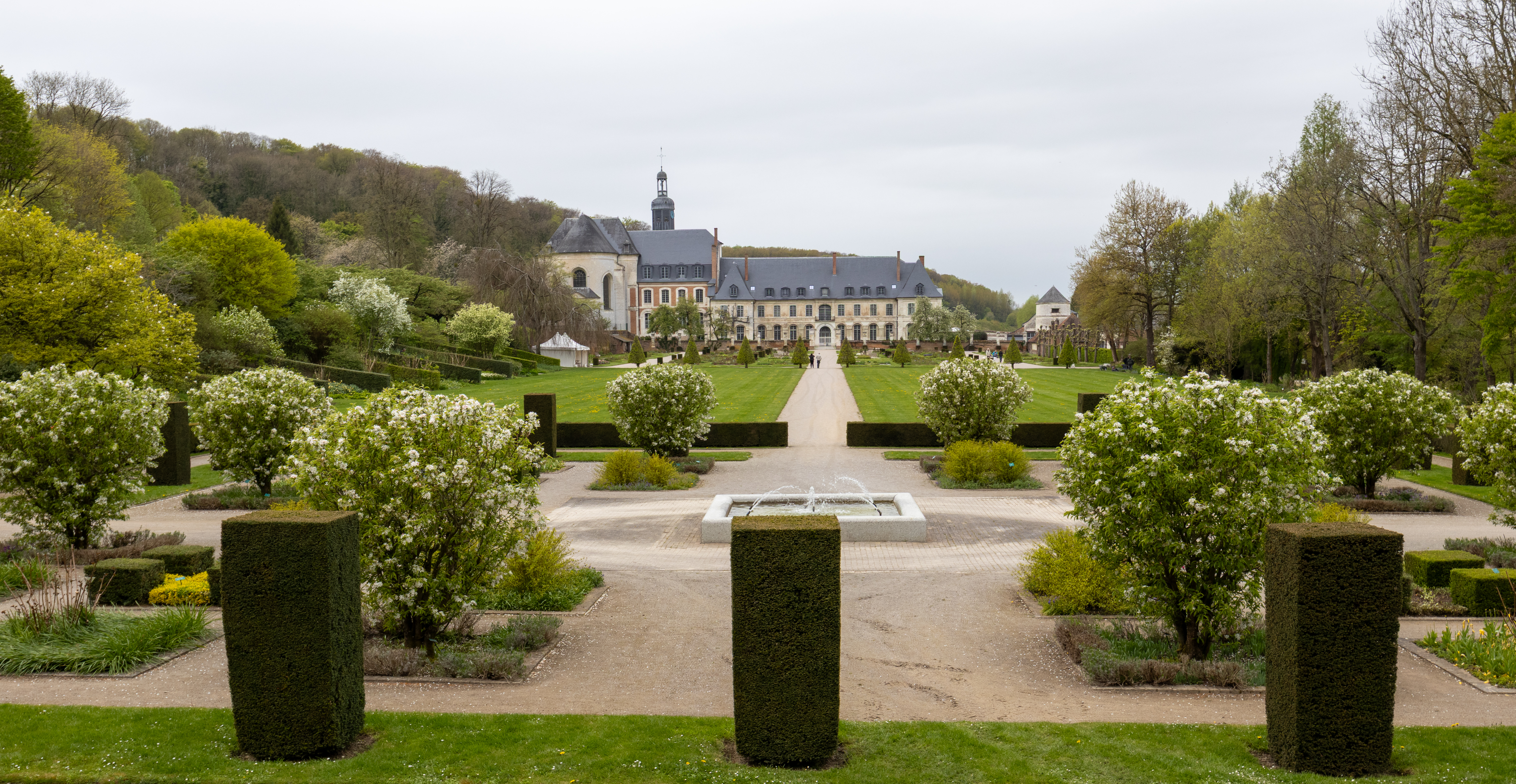
The gardens and abbey of Valloires

Created in 1989 with a collection of over 4000 rare plants, the Jardins de Valloires cover an area of eight hectares. Laid out below the abbey, the gardens are split into three distinct parts:

- A formal garden in keeping with the abbey building
- An English style garden, which contains the rare plant collection
- A marsh wilderness garden.

Gilles Clément, the famous landscape gardener was assigned to create the gardens. His ideas integrated the wild environment and the historic character of the place, but with little regard for the monastic garden style. Valloires is very much a contemporary garden.

The collection spans a huge variety of species, such as maple, spirea, deutzia, beech, plum and rare apple family members. Certain varieties are unique in Europe.

Recently, a new garden has been laid out, dedicated to the work of the naturalist Jean-Baptiste Lamarck, born in the Somme department in 1744.

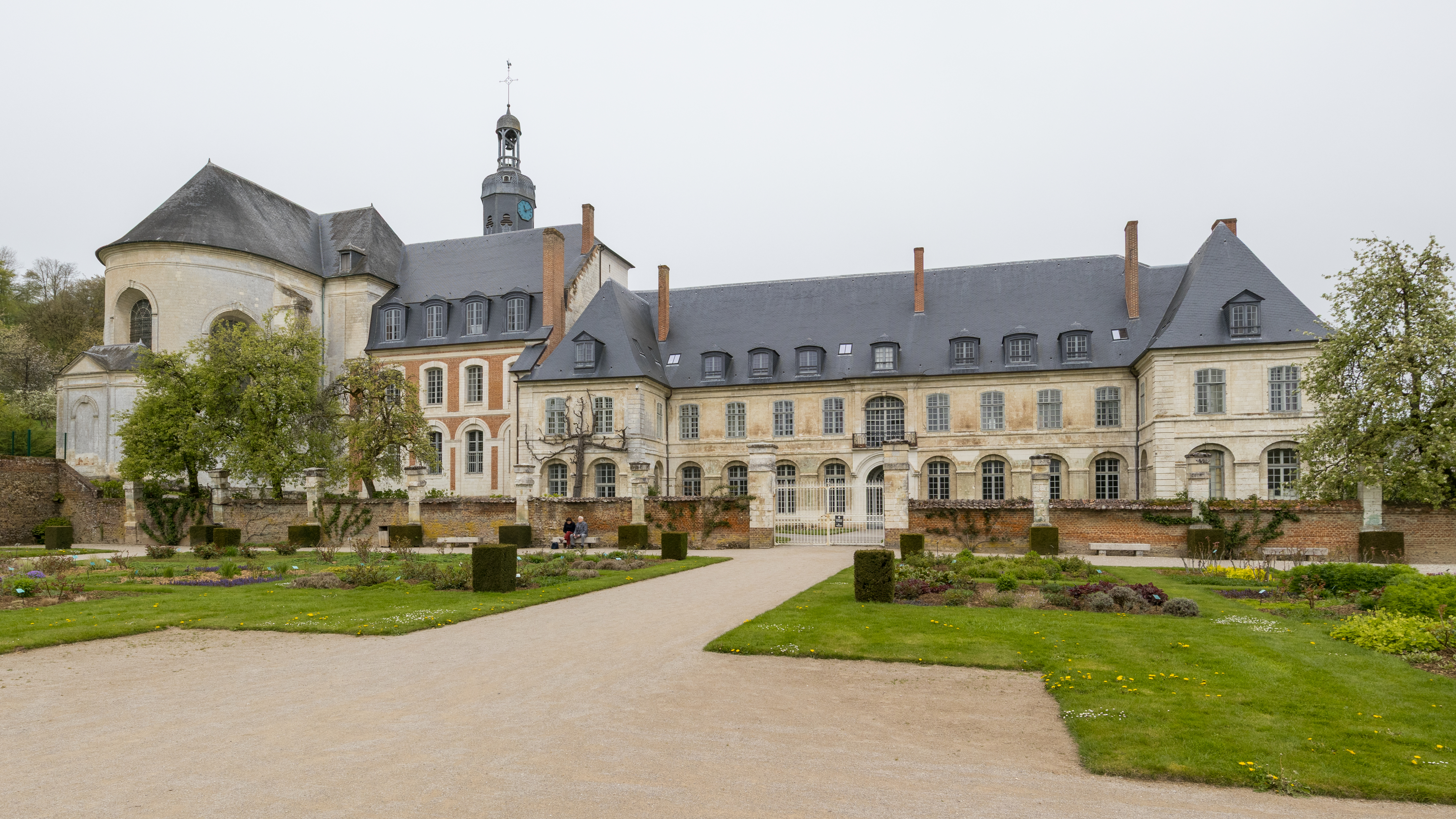

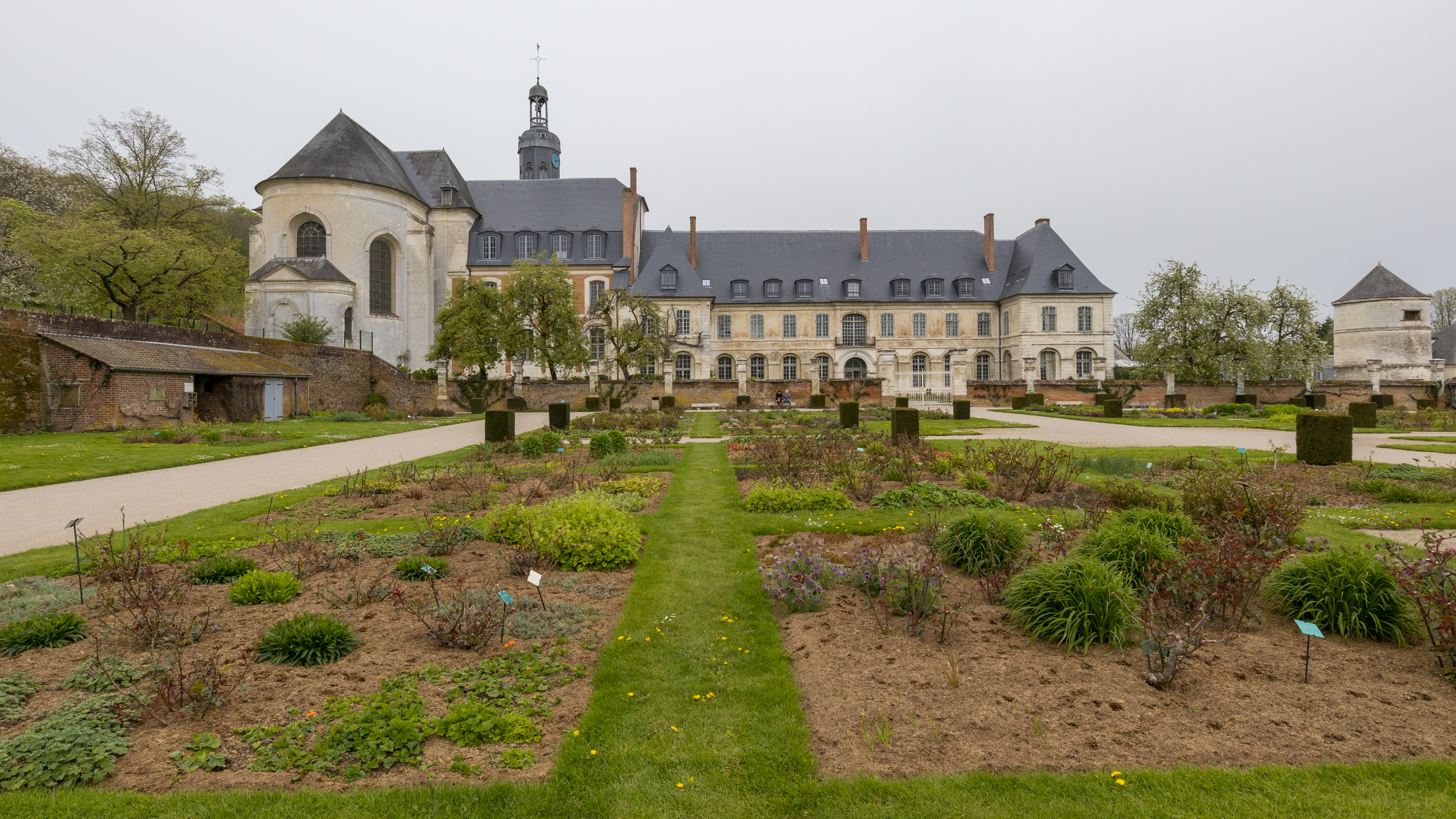
