= Château de Bertangles =

Castle in Hauts-de-France, France

Château de Bertangles Château de Clermont-Tonnerre
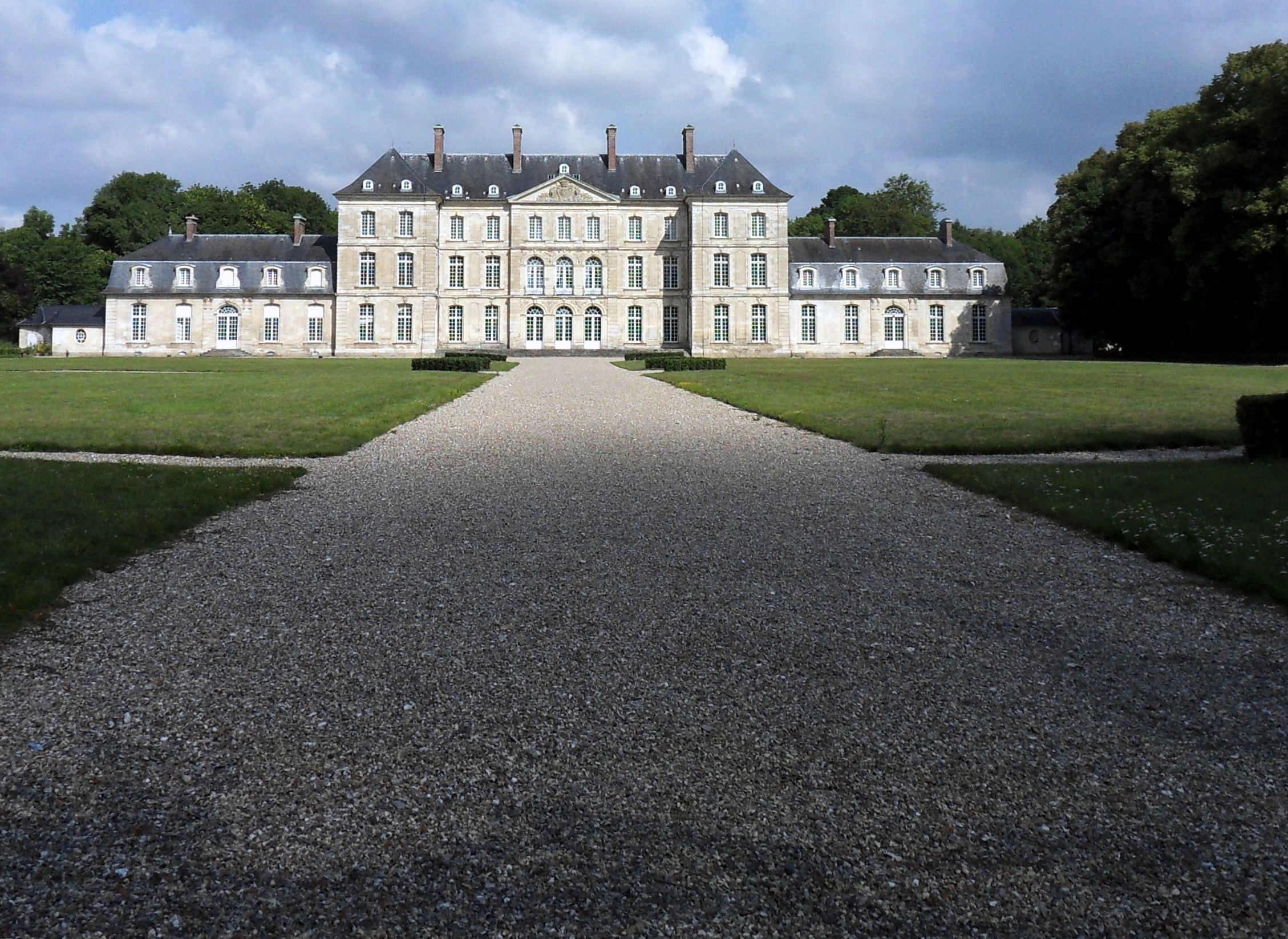

- Location within France

General information
- Coordinates: 49°58′21″N 2°18′6″E

The Château de Bertangles, also named Château de Clermont-Tonnerre, is a historic castle in Bertangles, Somme, Hauts-de-France, France.

== History ==
It was built from 1730 to 1734 for Count Louis-Joseph de Clermont-Tonnerre. It was designed by architect Germain Boffrand.
The gate, designed by Jean-Baptiste Veyren, was moved here from the Château d'Heilly in 1840.

During World War I, the château was the Australian Headquarters under the command of General John Monash.

On 12 August 1918 Monash was knighted on the battlefield, a Knight Commander of the Order of the Bath, by His Majesty King George V, the first time a British monarch had honoured a commander in such a way in 200 years.

The interiors were burned in a fire in 1930, and restored shortly after. It was later inherited by politician François de Clermont-Tonnerre.

On the eve of ANZAC Day on 24 April 2016, the Governor General of Australia Sir Peter Cosgrove came to Bertangles offering tribute to General Sir John Monash, with a tree-planting ceremony and the unveiling of a commemorative plaque.

== Architectural significance ==
It has been listed as an official historical monument by the French Ministry of Culture since 1982.
