= Jardins de Valloires =

Garden in France

Coordinates: 50.3475°N 1.8205°E

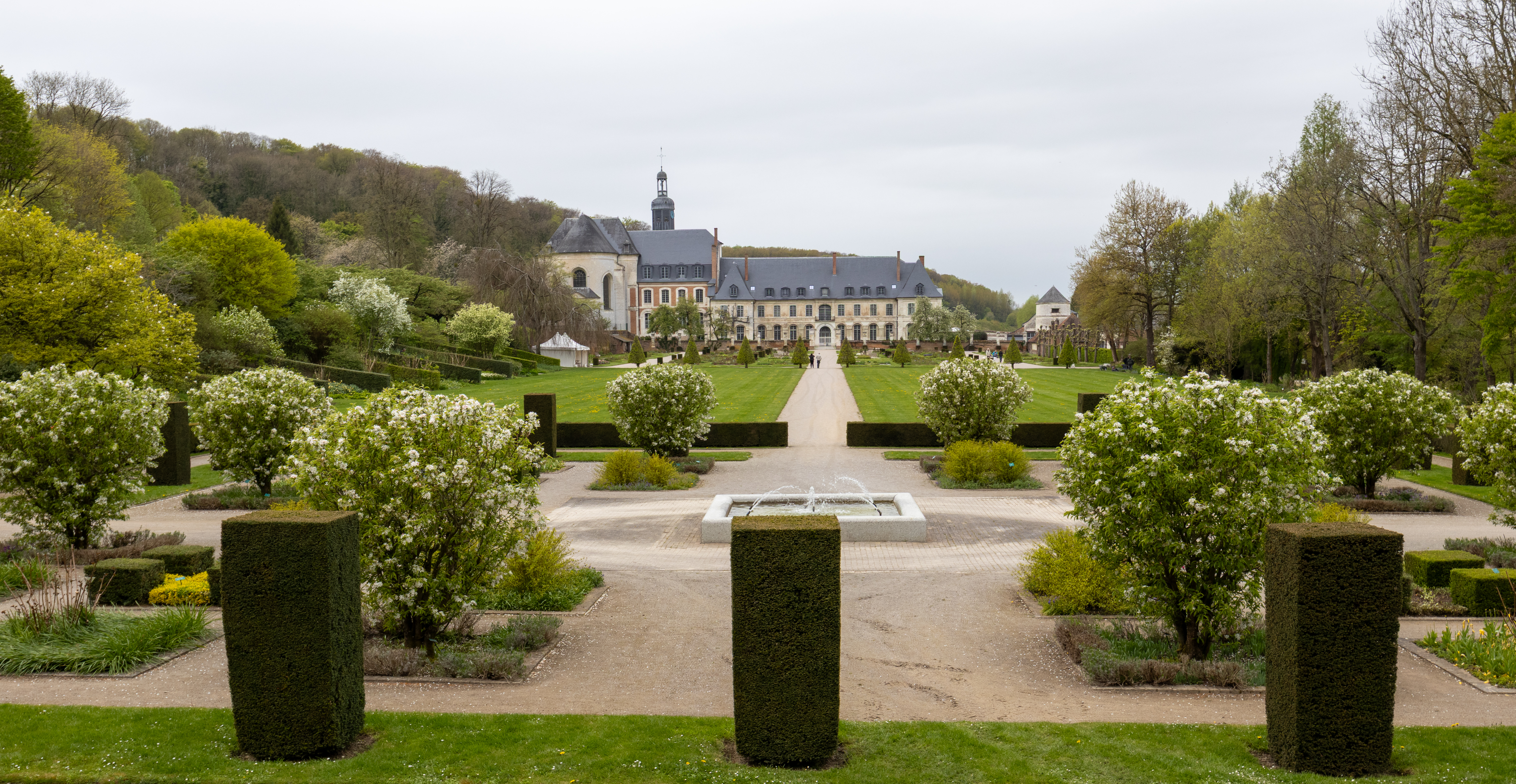
Jardins de Valloires

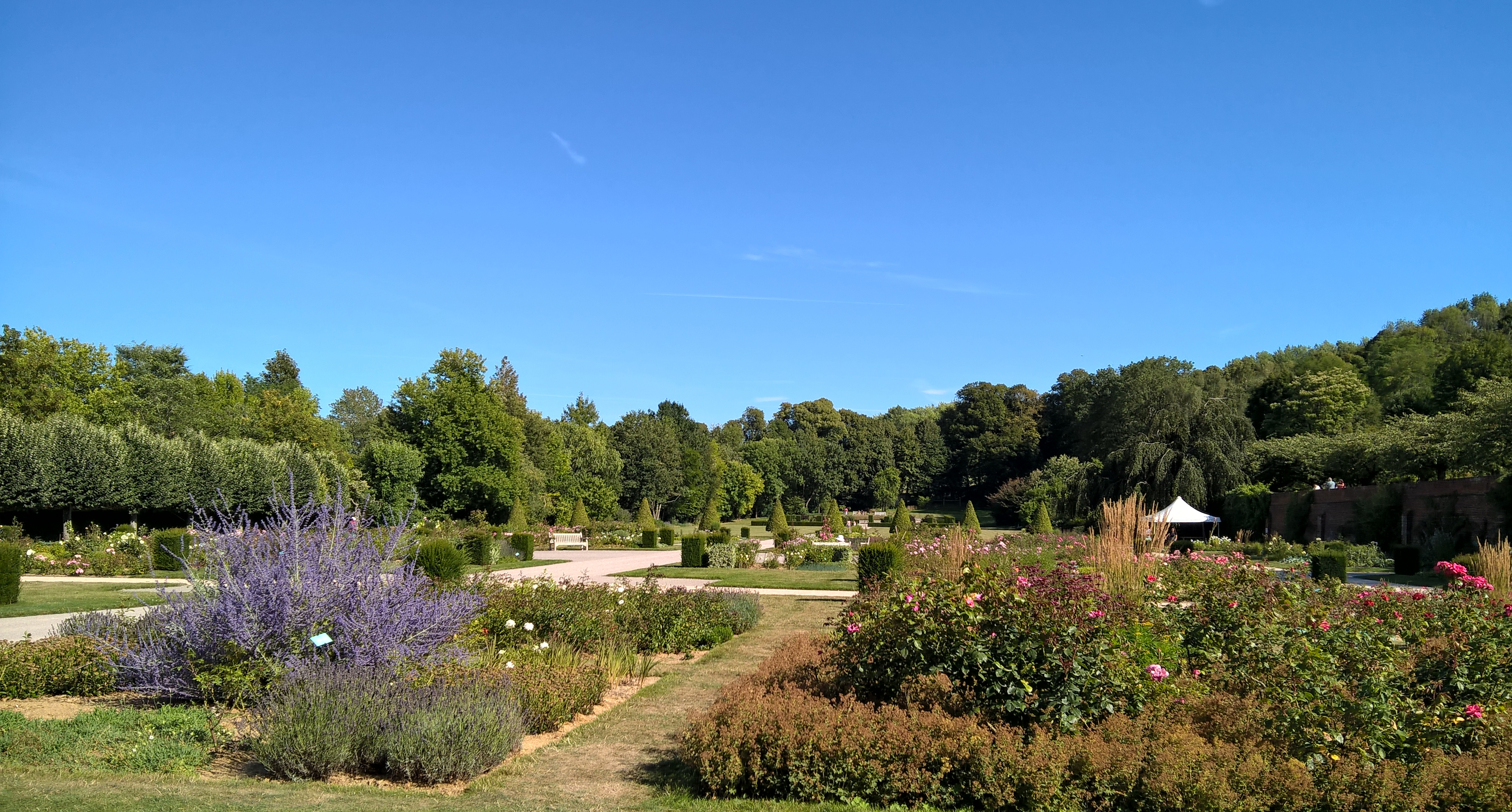
Gardens

The Jardins de Valloires (8 hectares) are botanical gardens located on the grounds of the 18th century Abbaye de Valloires in Argoules, Somme, Picardy, France. They are classified as a Jardin Remarquable, and open daily in the warmer months; an admission fee is charged.

The gardens' origins date to 1981 when gardener Jean-Louis Cousin began to look for a site for his collection of 3000 plant varieties from north Asia and North America. In 1985 the region of Picardy, department of the Somme, and the Syndicat Mixte pour l’Aménagement de la Côte Picarde (Joint Committee for the Management of the Coast of Picardy) agreed to build a new garden beside the Abbey of Valloires. Starting in 1987, the gardens were designed by Gilles Clément, who also designed the Parc André Citroën and the Jardin botanique du domaine du Rayol, and first opened to the public in 1989, with additional gardens created in subsequent years.

Today the gardens contain over 5,000 plant taxa, representing 75 botanical families, 698 genera, and 2,030 species, with an emphasis on plants native to China, Japan, and Central Asia. They are organized into three major sections:

- French gardens, to harmonize with the abbey's west facade
- English gardens (jardins des îles), containing botanical collections organized into "islands"
- a wilder, naturalistic garden.

Points of interest include a rose garden containing 200 varieties of modern and ancient roses, medicinal garden, vegetable garden, garden of evolution (6000 m², opened in 2003) in honor of local scientist Jean-Baptiste Lamarck, and garden of five senses.

The gardens contain a national collection of Rubus recognized by the Conservatoire des Collections Végétales Spécialisées (CCVS), as well as a collection of 98 Viburnum varieties. In addition, the rose garden contains three special varieties related to the site: the Jardins de Valloires created by André Eve and formally named in 1992 by Catherine Deneuve, the Rose des Cisterciens created by Delbard in 1998 in honor of the 900th anniversary of the Cistercian Order, and the Rose of Picardy created in 2004 by David Austin.

== See also ==
- List of botanical gardens in France
