= Roger de Piles' artists from Lombardy =

Roger de Piles's L'Abrégé de la vie des peintres...avec un traité du peintre parfait (The Art of Painting and the Lives of the Painters), was a major art biography of painters. It was written by the French spy Roger de Piles. In 1692, during the War of the League of Augsburg, he was arrested in the Hague carrying a false passport and imprisoned for the next five years, where he wrote his L'Abrégé in 7 parts; 1) Sketch of the perfect painter, 2) Greek painters; 3) Painters from Rome & Florence; 4) Painters from Venice; 5) Painters from Lombardy; 6) Painters from Germany and the Low Countries; 7) Painters from France and ending with his famous "Balance of painters". The book was finally published in 1699 following his appointment as Conseiller Honoraire to the Académie de peinture et de sculpture in Paris.

Part 5, Painters from Lombardy, includes in order of appearance in the text, the following list of artists:

- Antonio da Correggio (1489-1534), p 287
- Agostino Carracci (1557-1602), p 290
- Lodovico Carracci (1555-1619), p 290
- Annibale Carracci (1560-1609), p 290
- Guido Reni (1575-1642), p 305
- Domenichino (1581-1641), p 312
- Giovanni Lanfranco (1582-1647), p 316
- Francesco Albani (1578-1660), p 321
- Guercino (1591-1666), p 324
- Caravaggio (1571-1610), p 328
- Bartolomeo Manfredi (1582-1622), p 332
- Jusepe de Ribera (1591-1652), p 333
