= Michel Amelot de Gournay =

French diplomat and politician

Michel-Jean Amelot, baron de Brunelles, marquis de Gournay (1655—Paris 1724), was a French diplomat, conseiller d'état to Louis XIV from 1698, and connoisseur. He was the son of Charles Amelot, the President of the king's Grand Conseil, and the nephew of the elder Michel Amelot de Gournay (1612—1687), Archbishop of Tours.

== Career ==
In 1682, he was appointed ambassador to Venice, in which post he took with him as secretary his tutor, the connoisseur Roger de Piles. His success in this embassy was followed by further commissions, to Portugal (1685), Switzerland (1688–1698) and to Spain (1705–1709), where he played a prominent role during the War of the Spanish Succession and reorganized the Spanish army along the lines of the army of France.

He presided over the seances that adjusted the differences between Victor Amadeus II, duke of Savoy, who was the new King of Sicily, and the Prince of Monaco, following the Treaty of Utrecht; the agreement was signed in Paris, 21 June 1714. The envoy representing Great Britain on that occasion was the poet-diplomat Matthew Prior.

He was named président du Conseil de Commerce in 1716. Jacques Savary des Brûlons' encyclopedic summing-up of the contemporary state of commercial economics, Dictionnnaire universel de commerce (1723), was dedicated to him.

His purchase in 1713 of a Paris house in rue Saint-Dominique, faubourg Saint-Germain, the Hôtel Amelot de Gournay, which had been begun as a speculation the previous year by the architect Germain Boffrand and was in course of construction, revealed the daring of the architect and the courage of the patron. The hôtel had numerous features that set it apart from the conventional Parisian hôtel particulier of the epoch: its cour d'honneur was completely enclosed from the street by a low range with a central door in an Ionic triumphal arch motif; its facade was concave, with a giant order of Corinthian pilasters, and with its wings it embraced an oval forecourt. The house featured an oval salon, soon to become de rigueur in Parisian house planning.

== Personal life ==
On 3 March 1712, he married his daughter Marie-Anne to Henri-Charles Comte de Tavannes and Marquis de Suilly and d'Arc-sur-Thil, and his daughter Catherine to Joseph-Antoine Crozat, Marquis de Tugny, the nephew and eventual heir of Watteau's patron, the immensely rich collector and connoisseur, Pierre Crozat.
