= Roger de Piles =

French artist (1635–1709)

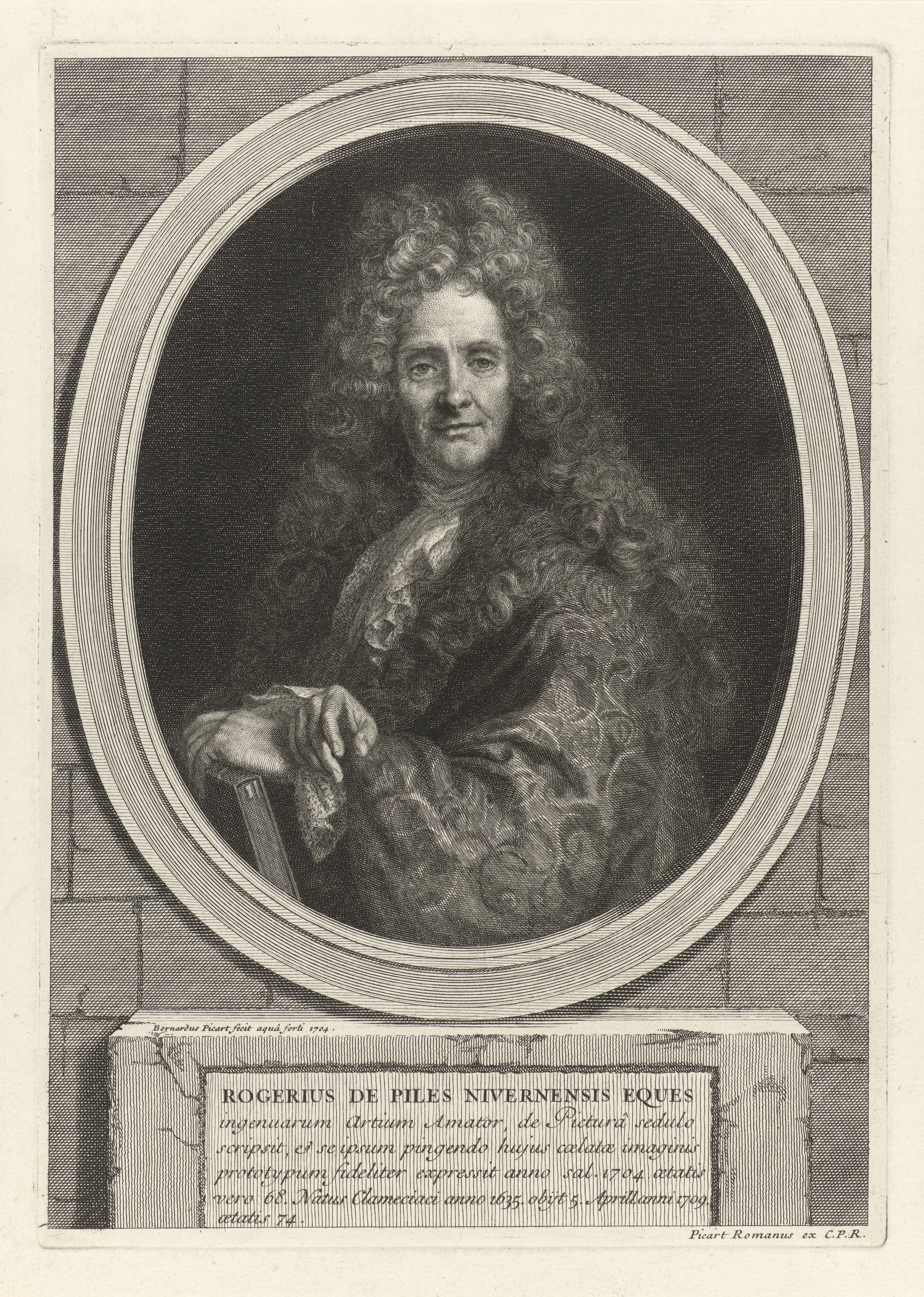
Portrait by Bernard Picart, 1704

Roger de Piles (7 October 1635 – 5 April 1709) was a French painter, engraver, art critic and diplomat.

== Life ==
Born in Clamecy, Roger de Piles studied philosophy and theology, and devoted himself to painting.

In 1662 he became tutor to Michel Amelot de Gournay, whom he was to follow throughout his life, acting as secretary to his various missions as French ambassador to Venice, Portugal, Spain.

De Piles went to Italy twice, first in 1673–1674 as tutor of Amelot on the latter's Grand Tour; and then again in 1682–1685, as his secretary when Amelot was appointed the French Ambassador to the Republic of Venice. On the latter occasion, de Piles was made a member of the Bolognese literary Accademia dei Gelati, most probably thanks to a motion promoted by his friend Carlo Cesare Malvasia, whom he had already met on the earlier occasion, as the Bolognese records in his Felsina Pittrice.

In Venice (1682–1685) he started a famous collection of prints, drawings and paintings of Giorgione, Correggio, Rembrandt, Claude Lorrain, Rubens, Antoine Coypel, Jean-Baptiste Forest.

He also acquired a taste for political intrigue using his travels ostensibly undertaken to study the European collections, as a buyer for Louis XIV, as cover for confidential missions - for example in Germany and Austria (1685) on behalf of Louis' minister, the marquis de Louvois.

He was not always fortunate as a spy. In 1692, during the War of the League of Augsburg, he was arrested in the Hague carrying a false passport and imprisoned for the next five years. He spent his time writing L'Abrégé de la vie des peintres ...avec un traité du peintre parfait. published in 1699 following his appointment as Conseiller Honoraire to the Académie de peinture et de sculpture.

In 1705 he followed Amelot de Gournay to Spain but illness forced him to return to Paris, where he died in 1709.

== Art critic ==
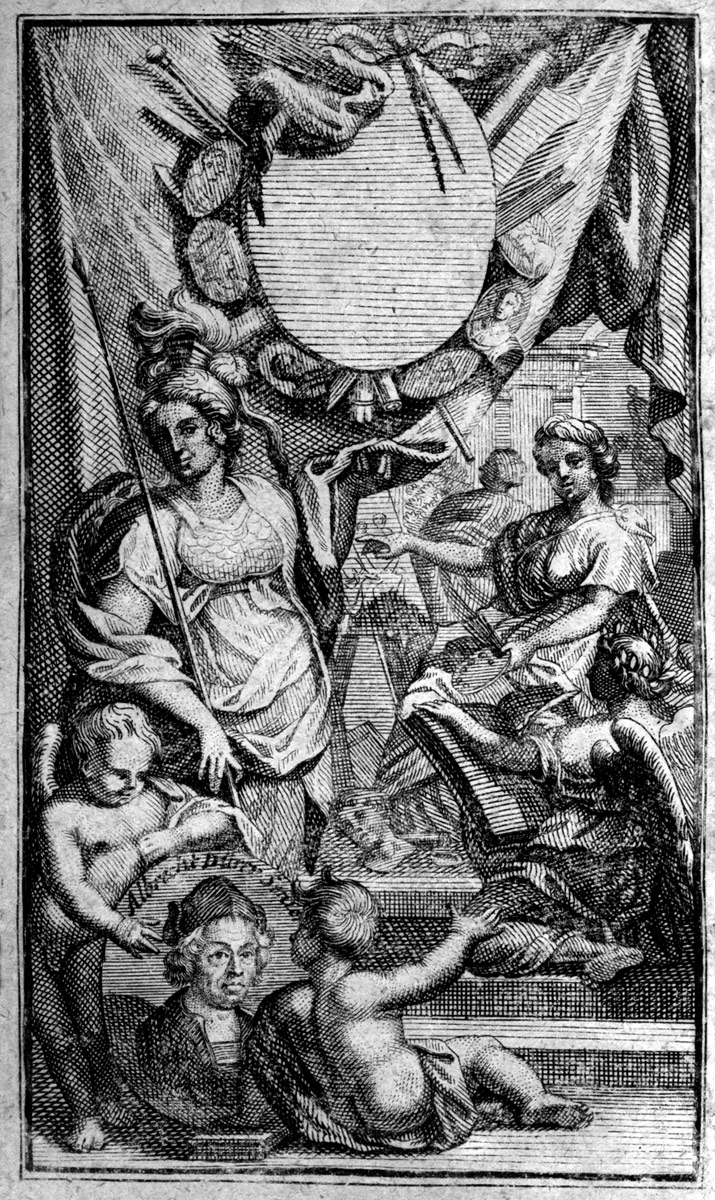
Roger de Piles, Frontispiece to History and life of the famous European Painters, Hamburg, Benj. Schiller, 1710

His important contribution to aesthetic theory rests on his Dialogue sur le coloris ("Dialogue on colours"), in which he initiated his famous defence of Rubens in the argument started in 1671 by Philippe de Champaigne on the relative merits of drawing and color in the work of Titian (in a lecture to the Académie de peinture et de sculpture on Titian's Virgin and Child with St John.)

The argument is most fascinating as an early debate on classic vs modern in painting; in essence on the mathematics of proportion and perspective in drawing—the classic approach— as opposed to the colored brush stroke—the approach of the moderns. In his detailed study of the argument, Roger de Piles et les débats sur le coloris au siècle de Louis XIV (1965), B. Teyssèdre gives a touching account of the bohème of the "modern" réfusés in seventeenth century Paris, a history that was to repeat itself with the Impressionists. The art historian Svetlana Alpers frames the importance of de Piles in a dozen plus pages on de Piles in her book on Rubens and persuasively details de Piles’s ideas and sensibility in particular his proposing of the alternating painterly modes of Poussinists and Rubenists which would inform the structure of French painting through the 19th century. She writes "It is less the values inherent in the style of Rubens and that of Poussin, and less the changing taste for each considered independently, but rather the differences perceived at any one time between the two that determined the dialectical structure of the history of art in France well into the nineteenth century. Art out of art, perhaps, but surely not art out of touch with the world."

In the course of the argument Roger de Piles introduced the term "clair-obscur" (Chiaroscuro) to highlight the effect of color in accentuating the tension between light and dark in a painting.

The way Roger de Piles documented his argument with Venetian and northern European examples was of influence to Antoine Coypel, Hyacinthe Rigaud, Nicolas de Largillière and François de Troy.

== Balance of painters ==
To his last published work: Cours de peinture par principes avec un balance de peintres (1708) de Piles appended a list of fifty-six major painters with whose work he had acquainted himself as a connoisseur during his travels.

To each painter in the list he gave marks from 0 to 18 for composition, drawing, color and expression. This gave an overview of aesthetic appreciation hinging on the balance between color and design. The highest marks went to Raffaello Sanzio and Rubens, with a slight bias on color for Rubens, a slight bias on drawing for Raphaël. Painters who scored very badly in anything but color were Giovanni Bellini, Giorgione and remarkably Michelangelo Caravaggio with 16 on color and 0 (zero) on expression. Painters who fell far behind Rubens and Raphaël but whose balance between color and design was perfect were Lucas van Leyden, Sebastian Bourdon, Albrecht Dürer.

De Piles's Balance de peintres was much discussed among art critics in the eighteenth century and ridiculed by William Hogarth in his print, Enthusiasm Delineated.

== List ==
The complete list is transcribed here from Manlio Brusatin:Histoire des couleurs (Paris: Flammarion, 1986, pp. 103–104), reproduced in Elisabeth G. Holt Literary Sources of Art History, (Princeton: Princeton University Press, 1947), pp. 415–416

Painter	Composition	Drawing	Color	Expression
Andrea del Sarto	12	16	9	8
Federico Barocci	14	15	6	10
Jacopo Bassano	6	8	17	0
Giovanni Bellini	4	6	14	0
Sebastian Bourdon	10	8	8	4
Charles Le Brun	16	16	8	16
I Carracci	15	17	13	13
Cavalier D'Arpino	10	10	6	2
Correggio	13	13	15	12
Daniele da Volterra	12	15	5	8
Abraham van Diepenbeeck	11	10	14	6
Il Domenichino	15	17	9	17
Albrecht Dürer	8	10	10	8
Giorgione	8	9	18	4
Giovanni da Udine	10	8	16	3
Giulio Romano	15	16	4	14
Guercino	18	10	10	4
Guido Reni	x	13	9	12
Holbein	9	10	16	3
Jacob Jordaens	10	8	16	6
Lucas Jordaens	13	12	9	6
Giovanni Lanfranco	14	13	10	5
Leonardo da Vinci	15	16	4	14
Lucas van Leyden	8	6	6	4
Michelangelo	8	17	4	8
Caravaggio	6	6	16	0
Murillo	6	8	15	4
Otho Venius	13	14	10	10
Palma il Vecchio	5	6	16	0
Palma il Giovane	12	9	14	6
Il Parmigianino	10	15	6	6
Gianfrancesco Penni	0	15	8	0
Perin del Vaga	15	16	7	6
Sebastiano del Piombo	8	13	16	7
Primaticcio	15	14	7	10
Raphael	17	18	12	18
Rembrandt	15	6	17	12
Rubens	18	13	17	17
Francesco Salviati	13	15	8	8
Eustache Le Sueur	15	15	4	15
Teniers	15	12	13	6
Pietro Testa	11	15	0	6
Tintoretto	15	14	16	4
Titian	12	15	18	6
Van Dyck	15	10	17	13
Vanius	15	15	12	13
Veronese	15	10	16	3
Taddeo Zuccari	13	14	10	9
Federico Zuccari	10	10	8	8

== Writings ==
- De Arte Graphica (1668) (Translation from Latin to French of Charles Alphonse Du Fresnoy's work - with supplementary comments by Roger de Piles).
- Dialogue sur le coloris (Dialogue upon Colour, 1673)
- Le Cabinet de Monseigneur le Duc de Richelieu (1676)
- Lettre d'un français à un gentilhomme flamand (1676)
- La Vie de Rubens (1681)
- L'Abrégé de la vie des peintres (1699), a seven-volume book of painter biographies:
  - The list of painters in Part 5: Roger de Piles' artists from Lombardy
  - The list of painters in Part 6: Roger de Piles' artists from Germany and the Low Countries
  - The list of painters in Part 7: Roger de Piles' artists from France
- Cours de peinture par principes avec un balance de peintres (The Principles of Painting, 1708), see: formal analysis
