= Charles Alphonse du Fresnoy =

17th-century French painter

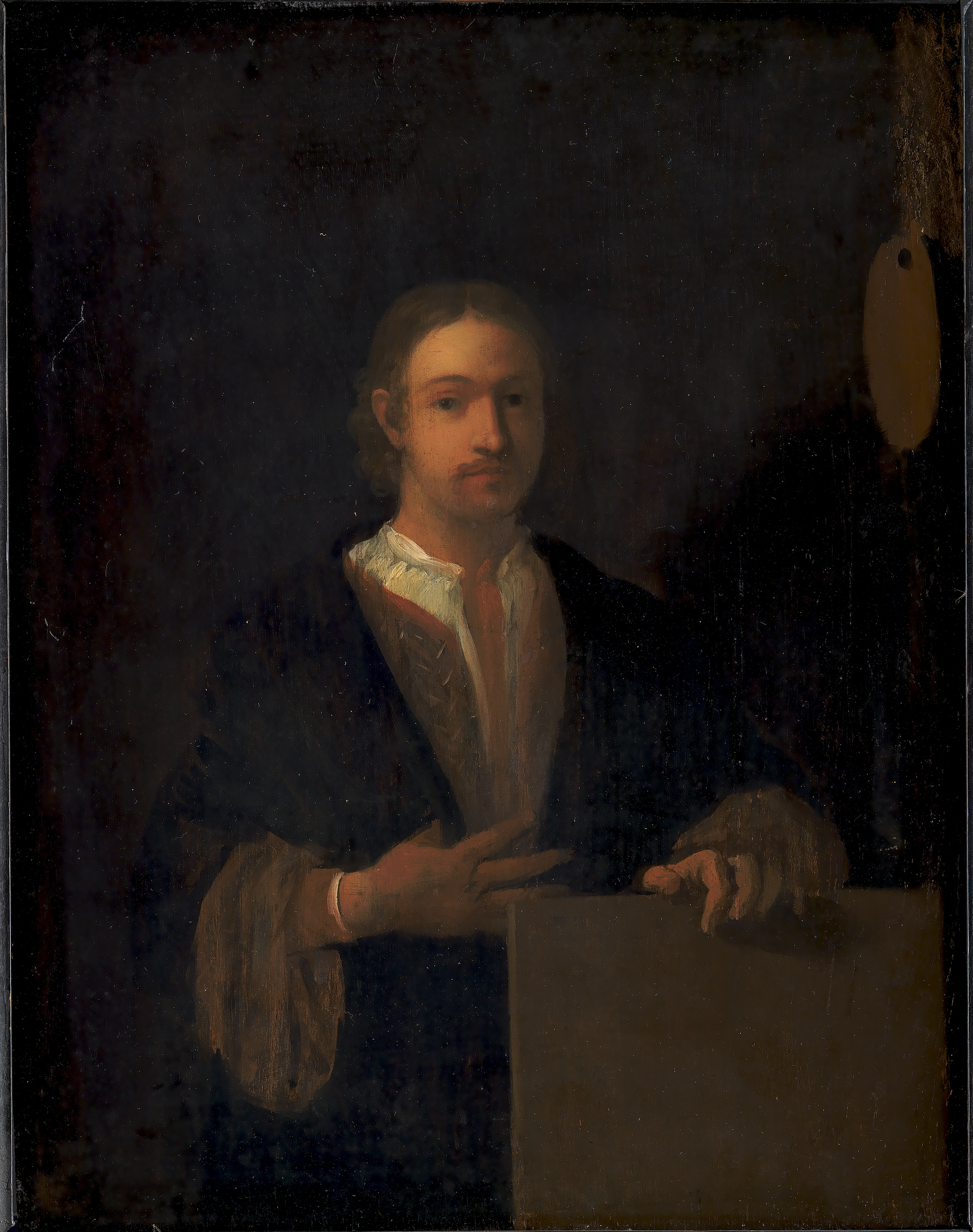
- Charles-Alphonse Dufresnoy, Self-portrait
- Born: 1611; Paris
- Died: 16 January 1668; Villiers-le-Bel
- Occupations: Painter, writer

Charles Alphonse du Fresnoy (French pronunciation: [ʃaʁl alfɔ̃s dy fʁɛnwa]; 1611 – 16 January 1668) was a French painter, poet and writer on art.

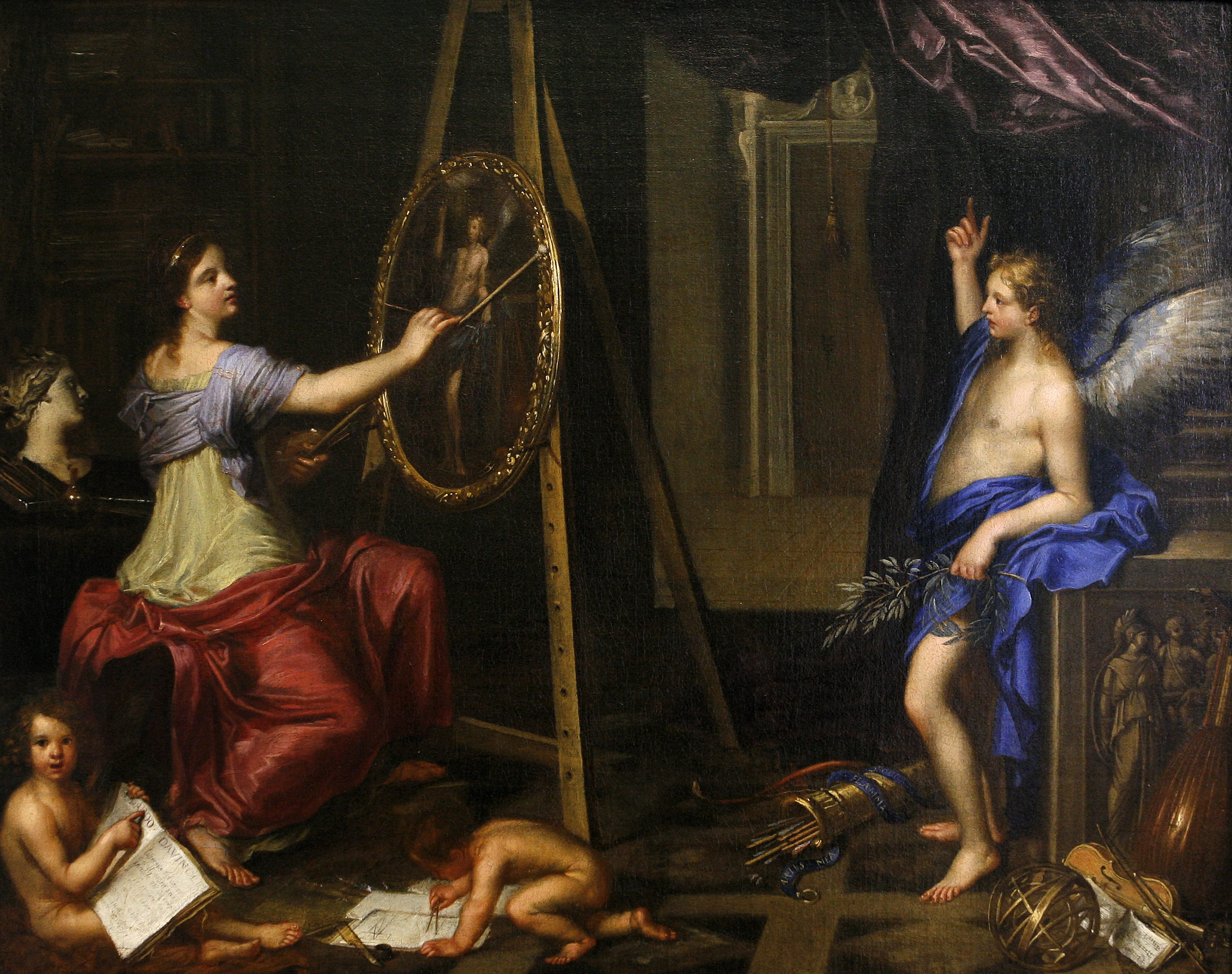
Charles Alphonse du Fresnoy, Allegory of Painting, Musée des Beaux-Arts, Dijon, 1650

Du Fresnoy was born in Paris, son of an apothecary. His father wanted him to enter the medical profession, and he excelled in college and was well educated in Latin and Greek. He, however, refused to apply for this vocation as he was more interested in poetry and the fine arts; his parents resented him for his refusal of the medical field. Starting from nineteen or twenty he learned the rudiments of design under Perrier and Vouet. At the age of twenty-one du Fresnoy, friendless and without money, went off to Rome, where he drew ruins and architectural subjects.

After two years thus spent he re-encountered his old fellow-student Pierre Mignard, and by his aid obtained some amelioration of his professional prospects. They moved into the same house and became such good friends that people called them the "inseparables". The cardinal of Lyon employed du Fresnoy and Mignard in making copies of works in the Farnese palace. It was also at this time that du Fresnoy, inspired by the works of Lucretius and Horace, began writing the Latin-language poem "De arte graphica" ("The Art of Painting"), about his observations on the art of painting. Du Fresnoy studied Raphael and the antique, went in 1633 to Venice, and in 1656 returned to France. During two years he was now employed in painting altar-pieces in the château du Raincy, landscapes, etc.

After Mignard returned to Paris in 1658, he and du Fresnoy resumed living together until du Fresnoy's death. Du Fresnoy revised "De arte graphica" throughout the 1650s. Though he wanted to see it published, he thought it improper to print the Latin poem without a French translation and thus requested one from Roger de Piles. Du Fresnoy had been writing a commentary on the translation when he suffered a stroke in late 1667. He died three or four months later on 16 January 1668 in Villiers-le-Bel, near Paris. He never married.

"De arte graphica" was first published by Mignard and has been translated into several languages. In 1668 Roger de Piles published his French translation; John Dryden translated the work into English prose in 1694; and a rendering into verse by William Mason annotated by Sir Joshua Reynolds followed in 1782.
