= Argoules =

Commune in Hauts-de-France, France

- Commune
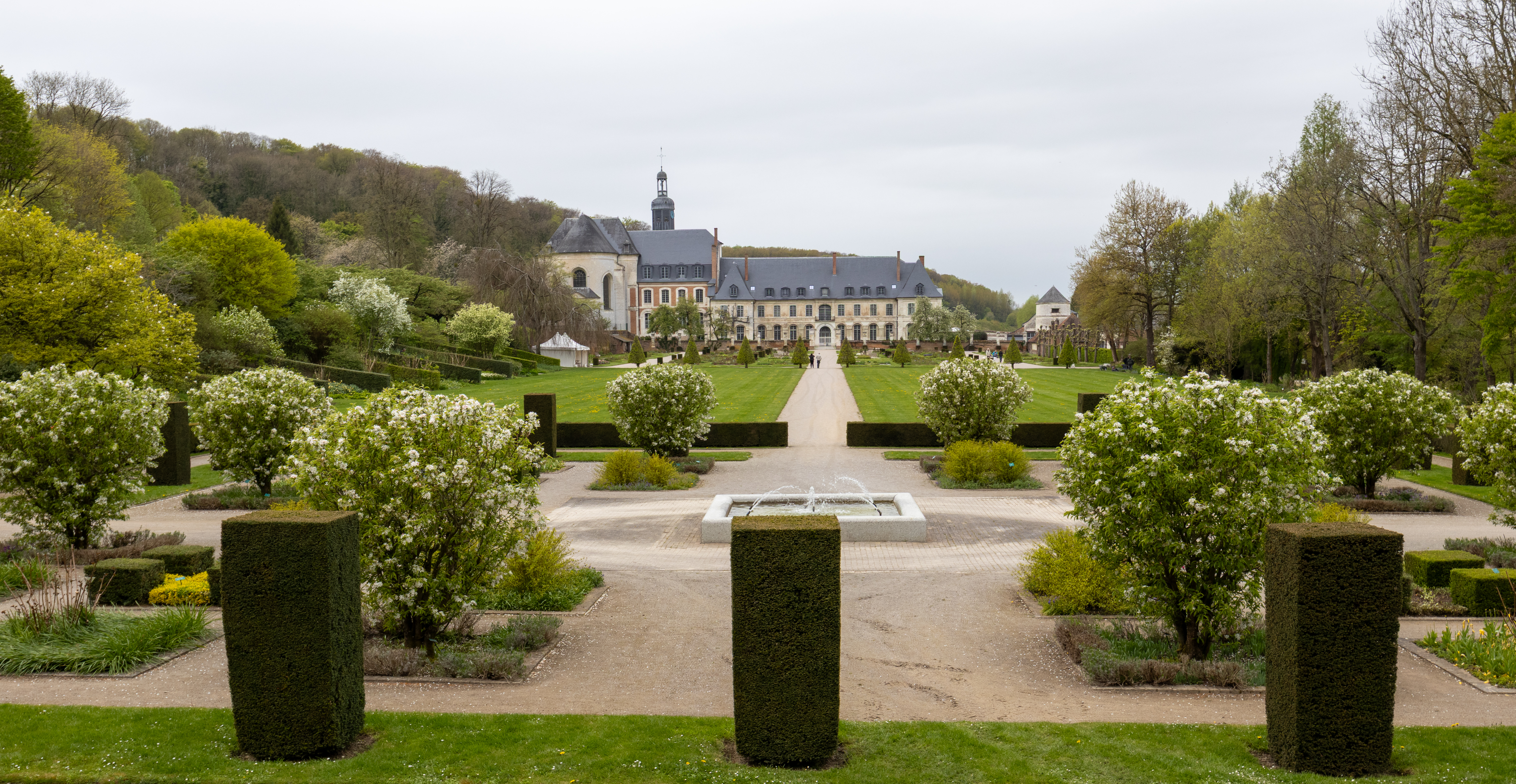
- Gardens and Abbey of Valloires

- Coat of arms
- Location of Argoules
- Location within France Location within Hauts-de-France
- Coordinates: 50°20′36″N 1°50′02″E
- Country: France
- Region: Hauts-de-France
- Department: Somme
- Arrondissement: Abbeville
- Canton: Rue
- Intercommunality: CC Ponthieu-Marquenterre

Government
  - Mayor (2020–2026): Claude Patte
- Area^{1}: 9.45 km^{2} (3.65 sq mi)
- Elevation: 67 m (220 ft)
- Highest elevation: 77 m (253 ft)
- Lowest elevation: 6 m (20 ft)
- Population (2023): 322
  - Density: 34.1/km^{2} (88.3/sq mi)
- Time zone: UTC+01:00 (CET)
  - Summer (DST): UTC+02:00 (CEST)
- INSEE/Postal code: 80025 /80120
- ^{1} French Land Register data, which excludes lakes, ponds, glaciers > 1 km^{2} (0.386 sq mi or 247 acres) and river estuaries.

Argoules (French pronunciation: [aʁɡul]) is a commune in the Somme department in Hauts-de-France in northern France.

== Geography ==
The commune is situated 23 miles (37 km) north of Abbeville on the D192, on the banks of the Authie.

== Population ==
Historical population

Year	Pop.	±% p.a.
1851	773	—
1954	736	−0.05%
1962	460	−5.71%
1968	446	−0.51%
1975	560	+3.31%
1982	451	−3.05%

Year	Pop.	±% p.a.
1990	363	−2.68%
1999	335	−0.89%
2007	335	+0.00%
2012	326	−0.54%
2017	326	+0.00%
2023	322	−0.21%

Source: EHESS and INSEE (1968-2023)

== Places and monuments ==
Argoules village is next to the Cistercian Abbey of Valloires, founded in the 13th century, then rebuilt in the 18th century. The abbey grounds now contain notable, contemporary gardens (the Jardins de Valloires).

== See also ==
- Communes of the Somme department
