= Château d'Heilly =

Ruined French castle

Coordinates: 49.9509°N 2.5348°E

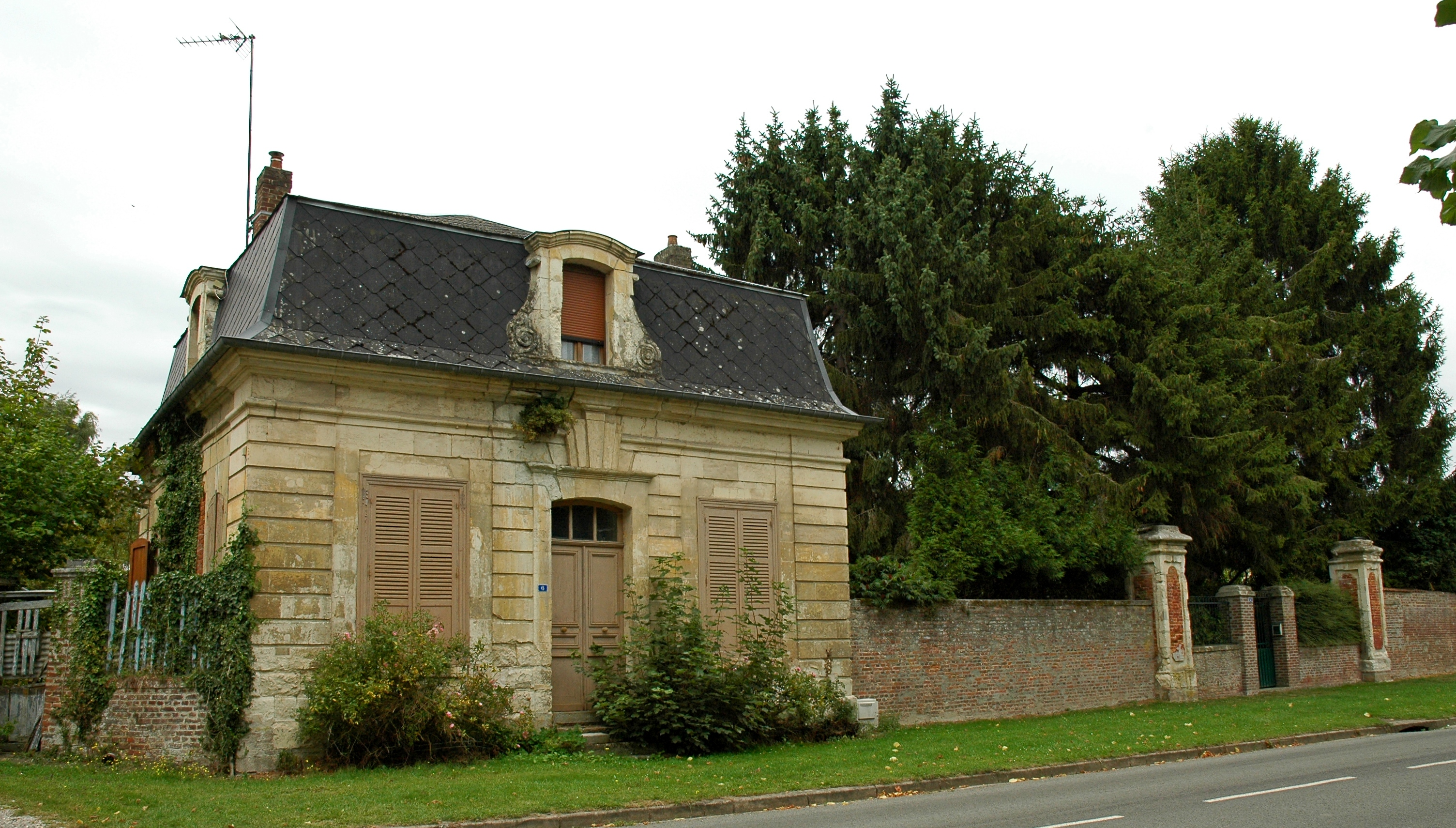
- Interactive map of the Château d'Heilly area

The Château d'Heilly is a ruined historic castle in Heilly, Somme, Hauts-de-France, France.

== History ==
The site has been occupied by a castle since the Middle Ages, but the present château was built in the 18th century. It was redesigned by the architect Pierre Contant d'Ivry in 1840. In the same year, the gate was moved to the Château de Bertangles.

It was demolished in 1848, and turned into a quarry.

== Architectural significance ==
The ruins have been listed as an official historical monument by the French Ministry of Culture since 2009.
