= François Perrier (painter) =

French painter and printmaker (1590–1650)

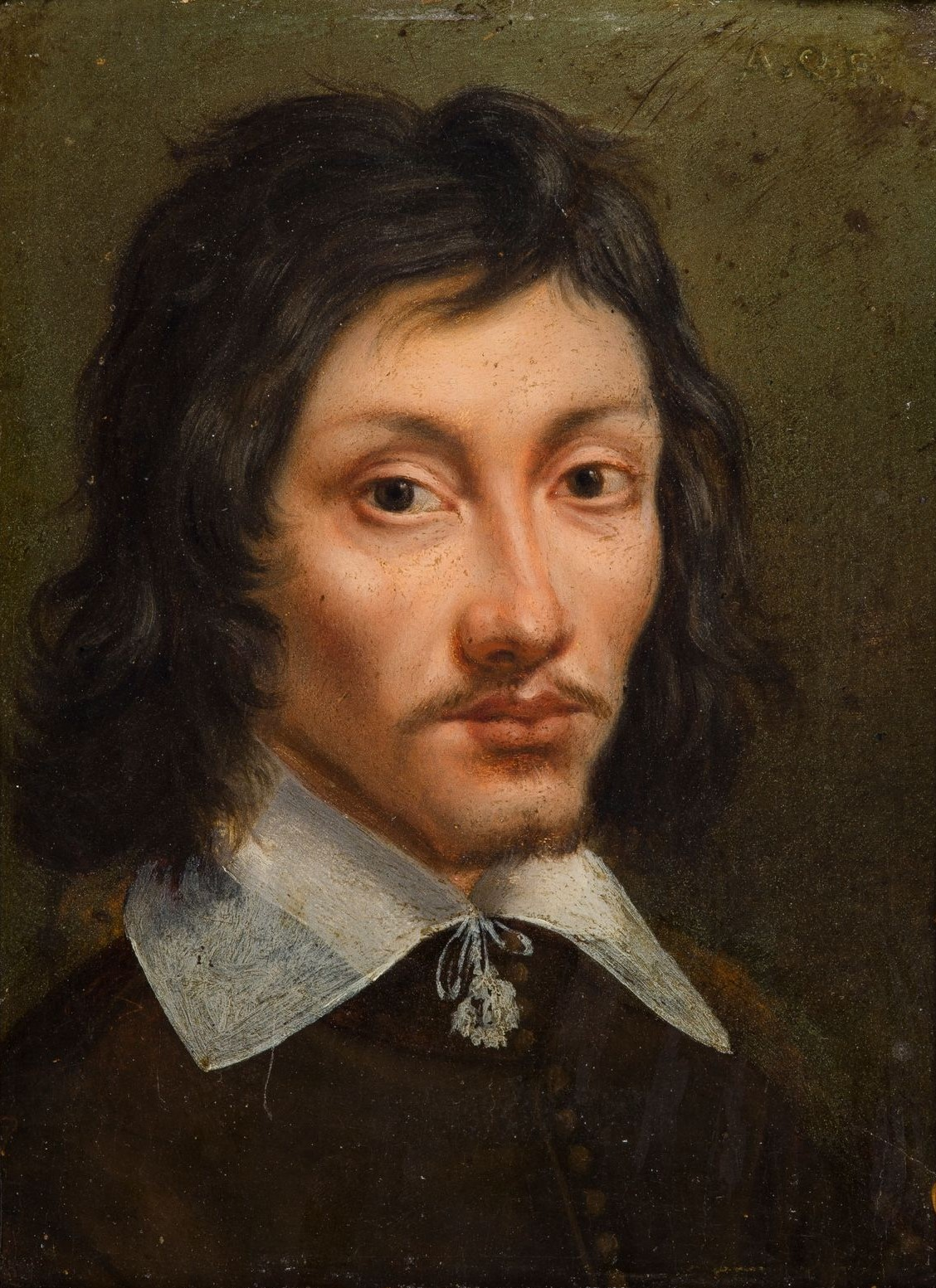
Portrait by Augustin Quesnel, c. 1615

François Perrier (French pronunciation: [fʁɑ̃swa pɛʁje]; 1590–1650) was a French painter, draftsman, and printmaker. Perrier was instrumental in introducing into France the grand style of the decorative painters of the Roman Baroque. He is also remembered for his two collections of prints after antique sculptures, the Segmenta nobilium signorum et statuarum quae temporis dentem invidium evasere (Paris, 1638), and Icones et segmenta...quae Romae adhuc extant (Paris, 1645). These prints provided visual repertories of classical models for generations of European artists and connoisseurs.

== Biography ==
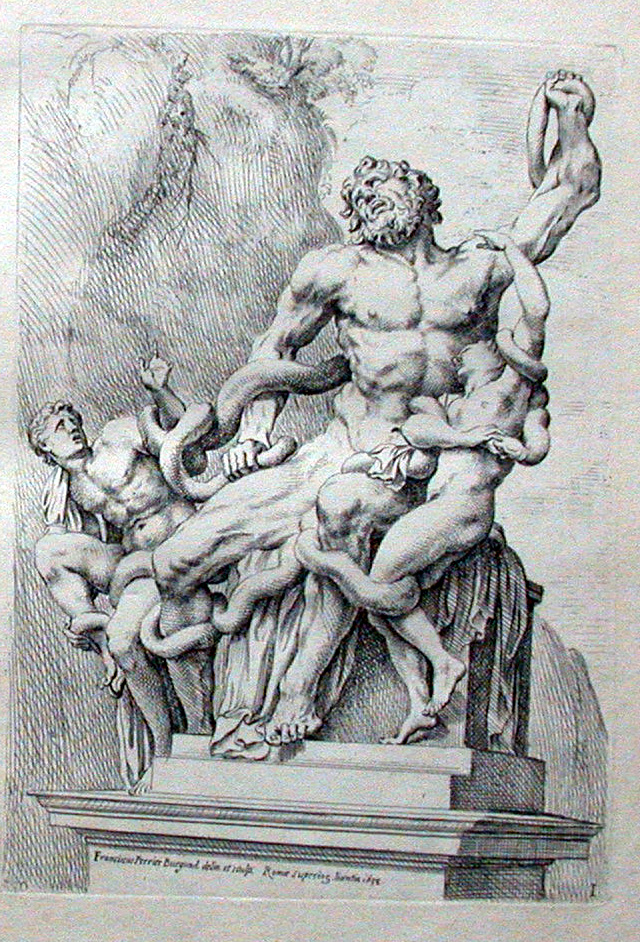
Laocoon group

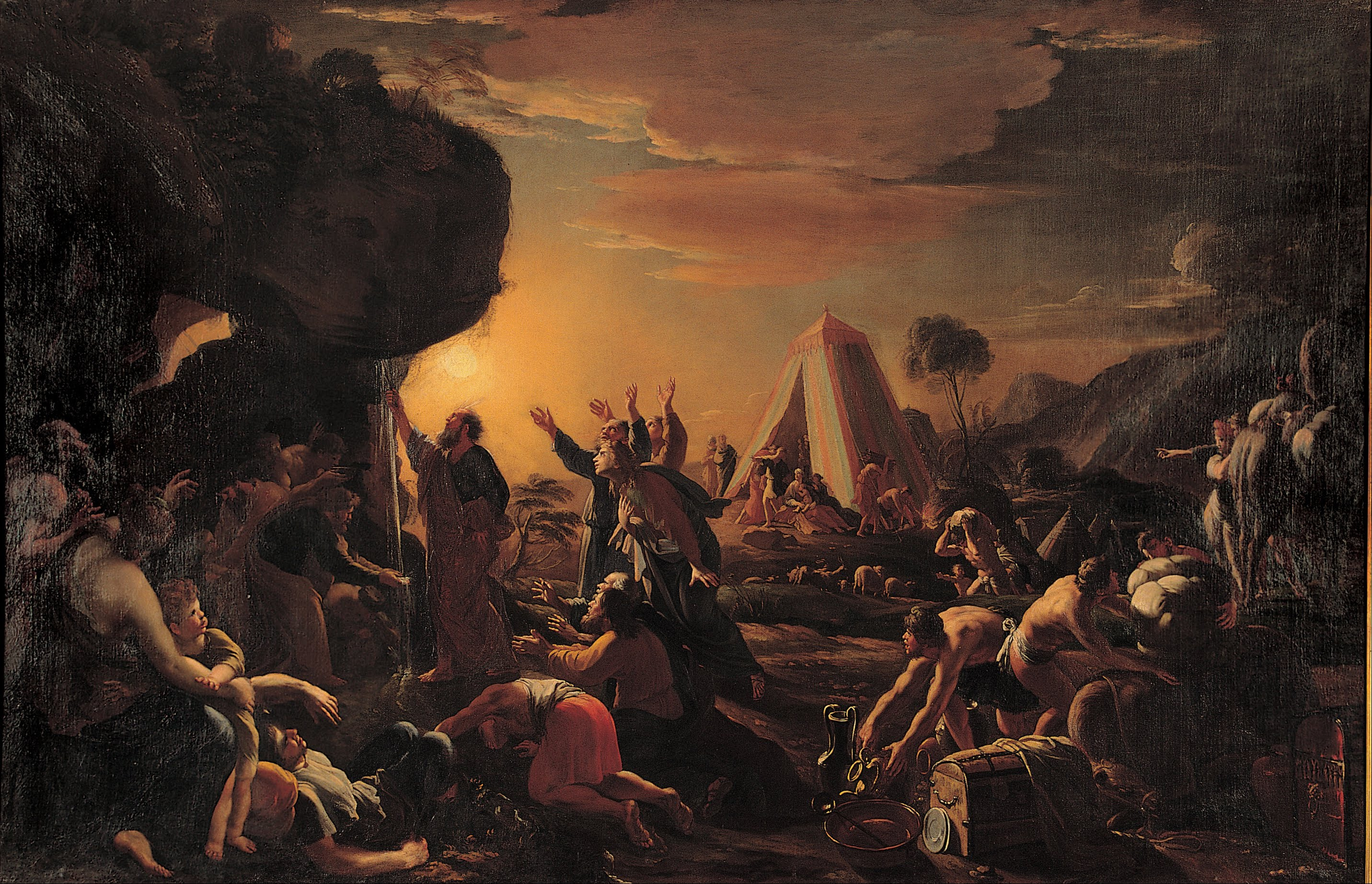
Moses draws water from the Rock

Perrier was born in Pontarlier, which was at the time part of the County of Burgundy and thus part of the Holy Roman Empire and not in France. During the years 1620–1625, he resided in Rome, where he took as his model the practitioner of academic Baroque classicism, Giovanni Lanfranco while he was employed on the fresco decoration of the dome of S. Andrea della Valle, one of the earliest examples of Roman Baroque ceiling decoration.

On his return to France, following a brief stay in Lyon he settled in Paris in 1630. Here he worked in the classicising circle of Simon Vouet. In 1632–1634, he had as his pupil Charles Le Brun, who would become a central figure of official French painting in the age of Louis XIV.

Perrier returned to Rome in 1635, remaining there for the next decade. During this period he created decorations for palazzo Peretti and saw to the publication in Paris of his great repertory of images. In 1645, once again in Paris, he painted the ceiling of the gallery of the Hôtel de La Vrillière, now the seat of the Banque de France and worked with Eustache Le Sueur on the cabinet de l’amour in the Hôtel Lambert.

In 1648, Perrier was one of the founders of the French Royal Academy of Painting and Sculpture and was elected as one of the original twelve elders in charge of its running.

He died in Paris.

In 1869, the French city of Mâcon founded its Musée des Beaux-arts with a bequest of eight canvases by Perrier.
